= List of caves in Serbia =

List of caves in Serbia.

Image	Name	Location	Notes
	Ceremošnja Cave	near village Ceremošnja and town Kučevo	The length of this small but beautiful cave is 770 m, of which 430 m is suitable for exploration by tourists. Bats can sometimes be seen during visits.
	Degurić Cave	Near Valjevo	
	Gradac Cave	near Kragujevac	Paleontological site
	Cave of Gabrovnica	27 km (16.78 mi) from Knjaževac	The cave is well known for its prehistoric paintings.
	Kađenica	Dljina village near Čačak	Cave-church
	Lazar's Cave	Zlot, 9.4 km (5.84 mi) from Bor	
	Petnica	5 km (3.11 mi) SE of Valjevo	
	Prekonoška cave	Svrljig	
	Rajko's Cave	The cave is located at the spring of Mali Pek, 2 km (1.24 mi) from town Majdanpek in Eastern Serbia	The cave is 2,3 km long (4 km with small side canals) and has an underground river flowing through
	Ravništanska cave	near Kučevo	540 m long with an underground stream and two exits in two different valleys
	Resava Cave	20 km (12.43 mi) from Despotovac	It is the first cave to be prepared for visits in Serbia.
	Risovača Cave	Entrance of the town Aranđelovac	
	Stopića Cave	Zlatibor	
	Ušačko-ledeni cave system	near Uvac	Discovered length of canals is 6.2 km, with parts of the cave still unexplored
	Potpeće Cave	Potpeće, 12 km from Užice towards Požega	
	Cerje Cave	Cerje (Niš)	To date discovered 6,025 meters, soon will be officially the longest cave in Serbia

== See also ==
- List of caves
- List of deepest Dinaric caves
- List of Dinaric caves
- List of longest Dinaric caves
- Speleology
