= Jerina's town, Brangović =

Archaeological site in western Serbia

Jerinin grad, Brangović
- Interactive map of Jerinin grad, Brangović
- 44°14′08″N 19°52′17″E
- Location: Brangović, Valjevo

Site notes
- Governing body: Republic of Serbia

Jerina's town, Brangović (Serbian Cyrillic: Јеринин град; meaning "Jerina's town") is an archaeological site of an early medieval fortress, located in the village of Brangović, western Serbia. The fort is located on the east bank of the Gradac.

== Name ==
The locals ascribed the city walls to the fairy "curse" of Jerina. The site is also called Brangovići (Бранговићи) The ruins were called "Runaway" (Бежане) by the people as it was used as a hiding place from the Ottomans.

== Geography ==
The fortress is located in Brangović (Бранговић), also known as Branegovići (Бранеговићи), situated 7 kilometres (4.3 mi) southwest from the city of Valjevo. It was built on a high cliff on the west slopes of Branig hill, on the west riverside of the Gradac.

The site is under the auspices of the municipality of Valjevo and the Ćelije Monastery.

== Fortifications ==
The fort is an irregular angular shape, 320 by 220 m. The highest point is located at altitude 441 metres (1,447 ft) and the lowest at 268m. The structure is topped with towers, from which long walls descend on a sharp slope viewing the river. The preserved fortification area is 3 hectares (7.4 acres), among the largest in northwestern Serbia. Vestiges indicate that the walls were from cut stone and lime mortar. Two sides feature sharp edges, strengthened almonds to prevent access. On the third side "Duzon" guard tower built at the end of narrow steep rocks that are difficult to pass. On the fourth side the fortress was protected by the river. On the top of the fortress, from the east side, a 5x7 m tower rose. On the west side at the lowest elevation is a 7,1 x 6,6 m tower. Other towers are thought to be similar in size.

There are remains of a 5th-6th century church that was destroyed in an Avar or Slavic attack at the end of the 6th century. It was built on the foundations of a building that burned in the 4th century, with dimensions of 13 m by 9 m. Its walls rose 1.7 m to 1.3 m above the cliffs fronting the river. Near the church was found two more premises (connected to the church, with the walls younger than the church walls) and a tomb 2 x 1 m, that was robbed in the ancient period, with the remains of four persons.

== History ==
The city was built in the 4th century to serve as an episcopal seat in the Roman Balkans. Researchers found the a remains of a church and the remains of the episcopal throne within. The fortress and the city were destroyed and rebuilt several times during barbarian invasions. In the 10th century it was abandoned, perhaps due to a Magyar-Serb conflict during Serbian Prince Časlav (r. 926–960). The church was only about two feet from the cliffs in the southwest corner of the fortress. This indicates that within the walls of the city there was a well-developed settlement that hosted many buildings. The church was built on the city's outskirts. Stratigraphic data in tower 1 and the church dates to around the 6th century.

The city's construction techniques belong to the tradition of early Byzantine military architecture. During the 6th century, starting from the reign of Anastasius I Dicorus came a major renovation of the northern part of the Empire. The renovation lasted until the middle of the century. The fortress may have been built in that time. The Gradac canyon was of great importance during the Roman Empire because, it reached one of the main cities, Simriy, near the metalliferous area of Podrinje and east Bosna's border. Trade reached Dalmatia and was one of the key economic systems of this part of the Empire. The fortress may have been built on an earlier city. Archaeologists found two layers of arson and destruction, one from the first half of the 5th century, and the other from the end of the 6th century. It developed into a significant regional center that likely connected to the minerals industry in the region. The fortifications were possibly improved later, at the end of the 4th century, to protect the settlement from the river. Communities within the city walls were later moved a few miles downstream, on the Grabac and Kolubara deltas, where the core of the modern city of Valjevo formed.

Evidence of bitter struggle between Slavs against invaders was excavated, including remnants of broken arms lost in combat and metal objects (primarily iron used to build wooden structures). The need for metals at that time led the Slavs to sift through the ashes looking for metal.

Little remains of the fortress' walls and buildings. Among the most interesting locations within the fortress is the remains of the "donjon" (keep) tower, episcopal church and Lent premises. The National Museum of Valjevo contains artifacts of Jerina.

== Etymology ==
Veselin Čajkanović believed that the Slavic name Jerinin grad was actually derived from Hellene ethnonym. This is implied also by the fact that the city emerged under the Roman Empire, and then became part of the Byzantine (eastern) empire. The city's first large-scale destruction came from Huns and their allies. Towards the end of the 5th century, the Byzantines retook it. As Slavs and Serbs arrived in this Greek-dominated empire, it is logical that they called towns "Hellenic" (Greek). Another interpretation is that the term "damned Jerina" (prokleta Jerina) comes from the oldest Slavic fairy (vila) and that "damned" means condemned to eternal wandering in the ruins of the city.

== See also ==
- Degurić Cave
