= Cave of Gabrovnica =

Cave in Zaječar District, Serbia

Gabrovnica Cave
- Pećina Gabrovnica
- Location within Serbia
- Location: Gabrovnica, Knjaževac, Serbia
- Coordinates: 43°26′26″N 22°25′29″Eyes
- Discovery: 1997

Gabrovnica Cave (Serbian: Pećina Gabrovnica) is located in Gabrovnica, Knjaževac, Serbia. Near Knjaževac, in the village of Gabrovnica, there is a cave whose walls hide the only preserved prehistoric cave drawing. The cave is well known for its prehistoric paintings. Cave art is visible at the cave entrance, and it represents the first discovery of its kind in Serbia. Five paintings can be observed.

== Dating ==
The drawing is related to the end of the Bronze Age and the beginning of the Iron Age. Its age is between 3000 and 4000 years. Based on the type of dagger that is represented above the horse's neck, it is concluded that the drawing is from the Bronze Age period.

== Drawings ==
It is the most significant and visible drawing of several of them in the cave. The drawing represents a horse with a rider and is done in black. Five representations painted in black were found. A horse with a rider in two places in the cave, a horse with a dagger, one irregular circle and one very illegible representation.

On the right side of the cave entrance is represented a horse. Above the horse are three vertical lines that most probably represent spears as one of the lines terminates in the pointed, leaf-shaped extension. Above the horse neck is depicted an object that could, with certain reserve, be distinguished as a dagger or short sword. The point of the dagger is turned upward. The blade is of flamelike shape while the hilt has extended base whose ends are turning downwards. The drawing is painted black. Above the representation of dagger, there is partially preserved unidentifiable representation of crescent or wide sickle. Above the main representation of a horse, on the right wall of the cave entrance, is another, very faded picture painted in black. This picture depicts a horse, probably with a rider. Certain damage as a result of scratching and rubbing in the recent time is visible on the picture. In front of the representation is a regular row of three, possibly natural circular recesses in the rock, 2-2.5 cm wide and 1.5-2.5 cm deep. On the left entrance wall was a painting of an irregular circle (or loop) with crossing ends while in the interior, at the very beginning of the corridor are two representations, one above the other. The upper representation depicts a horse with the rider but could not be perceived completely because the head and one foreleg are missing. The lower representation could not be identified. The analysis of paintings revealed great similarity concerning technique of painting and the fashion and style of depicting horses and riders. All representations are painted with black pigment, resembling soot which merged with limestone base and does not wipe off. On the drawings with the rider the paint is poorly preserved. The horses on all representations were depicted as tramping or trotting to the right with, pronouncedly raised tail and slightly raised one foreleg. Certain inconsistency of painter's intention and representation itself, at least because the position of the tail indicates trotting or galloping while the position of feet suggests just walking (only exception is the main representation). The treatment of composition is linear and schematic especially on the drawings with the rider. However, on the main representation the intention is obvious to represent certain body parts (tail, muzzle, legs, hooves and in two instances also mane) in the realistic manner or at least in the expressive way, while the body is depicted on all paintings as an irregular rectangle with horizontal lines of back and belly. The back part of the body, i.e., the croup is usually depicted in a slanting position even on the main picture where some corrections are noticeable especially in that area. In representing of certain body parts the similarities are also pronounced: the head is covered with black paint, the muzzle is of triangular shape and ears are emphasized. On the both paintings with the horseman, the figure of a rider is hardly recognizable and is disproportionally small in relation to the horse. In one case it is obvious that perspective was not taken into account - the horseman is turned en face to the observer.

The figural representations from Gabrovnica have not much in common with the cave art from the earliest period of prehistory. Moreover, the representations of horsemen and typical weapons as well as certain schematism in realization lead to the conclusion that drawings from Gabrovnica are not earlier than the Bronze Age. In the southeastern Europe, for the time being, many engraved and painted representations on the rocks were discovered. They were found in Montenegro (Lipci rock art, Police, Vezirova brada, Grbaja), Albania (Tren, Reci) eastern Bosnia (Zlijeb), Romania (few sites in Oltenia), northern Bulgaria (Magura, Gor-talovo, Orešak) and north Greece (Tsogar, Kirki). Most of them could not be precisely dated. The exceptions are only a few representations dating from the end of Bronze Age and the beginning of Iron Age representation of deer in Lipci - painted with white paint, black painted representations from Magura cave (only thirty kilometers far from Gabrovnica) and, particularly, engraved representations in Bulgaria and Greece that are sometimes discovered in the vicinity of megalithic monuments. We can not say anything for sure about the chronology of Gabrovnica representations. However, the representation of dagger above the horse neck and a row of holes in front of the representation of horseman at the cave entrance could point to the time of their origin. The represented dagger, judging by its shape has the closest parallels with daggers and short swords with flame-like blades and a hilt with extended base (solid cast, shaped like a cup, with antenna terminals) which, in central Europe, appear from the end of Middle Bronze Age until the beginning of the Early Iron Age while rows and groups of holes were ascertained on many representations from this period in Bulgaria and Greece. The paintings from Gabrovnica most probably represent some of the earliest manifestations of cult of a horseman - hero in southeastern Europe. It is the cult that could be observed in this area since the myth about Rhesus and through the myth of Thracian Hero and the cult of Thracian horseman also in the much later, medieval, period. It should be also mentioned that in the representations from Gabrovnica are reflected elements of central European milieu (composition structure, shape of a dagger) as well as of Thracian realm (holes, mythological context). The appearance of central European elements could be explained as a result of expansion influence and tradition of Late Bronze Age cultures (Urnfield cultures, Gava complex etc., ending with intrusion of Thraco-Cimmerians) that encompassed large part of Balkan peninsula from the 13th until the 8th century B.C. On the other hand, the differences in attitude, style, contents and meaning could indicate not only chronological distinctions between sites but also different rituals practiced at these spots.

== Location and access ==
The cave in the Gabrovnica village is located on the left side of the old road Kalna – Gornja Kamenica. The cave entrance, 2 m wide and 1.5 m high, is located about 30 m above the Trgoviški Timok river. The entrance narrows towards the interior, where the corridor of undetermined length begins.

== Research history ==
The only recorded examples of cave painting in Serbia were discovered in 1997 during research jointly conducted by the Faculty of Philosophy from Belgrade and the Local Museum in Knjaževac.
