= Kađenica =

Cave in Serbia

Coordinates: 43°53′52.7″N 20°10′1.3″E

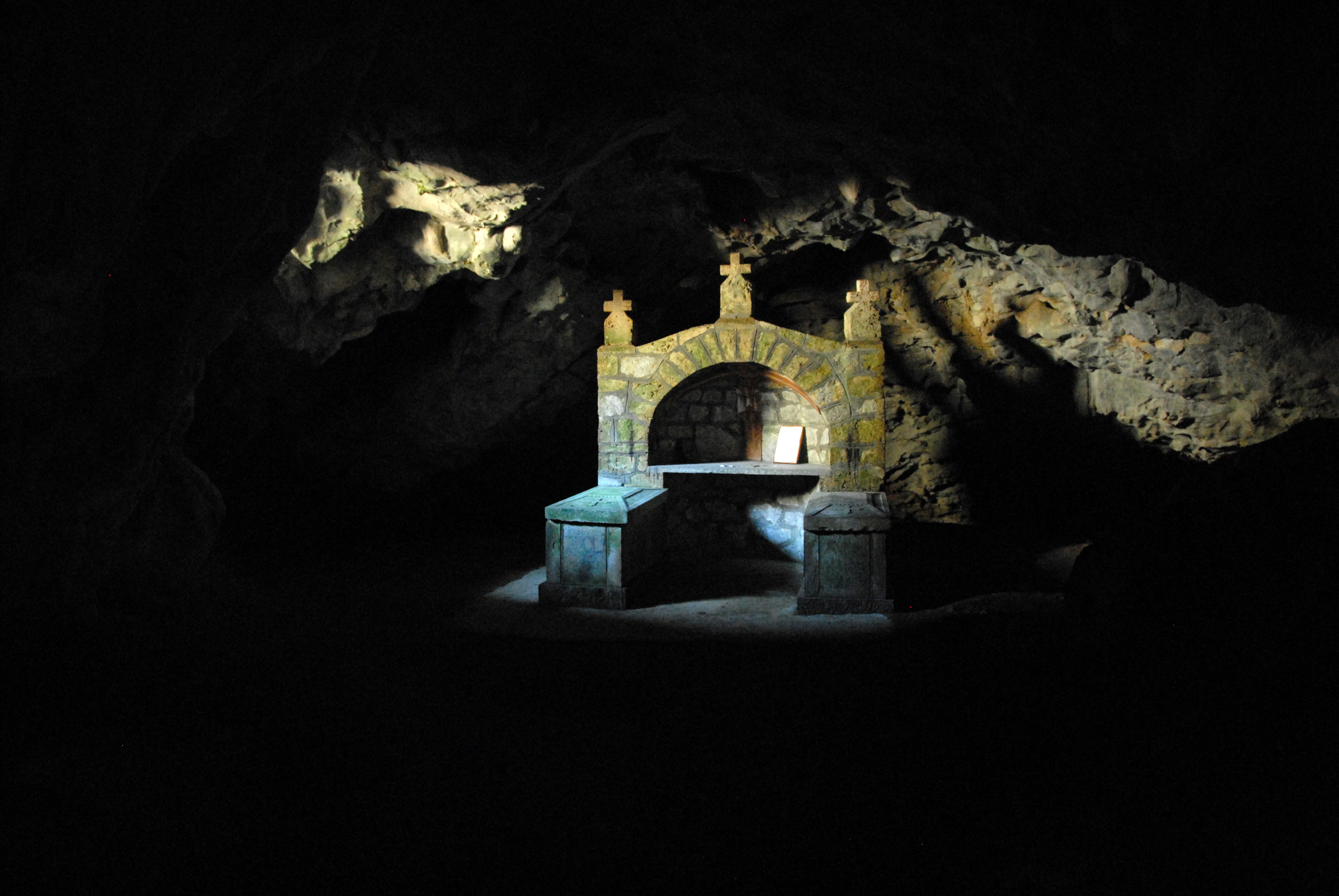
- Kađenica chapel

Religion
- Affiliation: Serbian Orthodoxy
- Leadership: Serbian Orthodox Church

Location
- Location: Dljin, (Čačak), Serbia
- Interactive map of Kađenica

Architecture
- Type: Cave-church
- Materials: Stone

The Smoke Cave or Kađenica is a cave-church located in the village of Dljin near Čačak on the right bank of the Zapadna Morava, one kilometre upstream from Ovčar Banja, Serbia.

During the Hadži Prodan's revolt in 1814, people found refuge in the cave. Turks discovered their hiding place and using straw and wood set it on fire, suffocating everyone inside. This incident also gave the name to the cave. In 1936 the remains were retrieved, fully cremated and buried in two stone sarcophagi. They were placed in the cave's church altar apse, under the representation of Jesus' Crucifixion.

== See also ==
- List of caves in Serbia
