= Rajko's Cave =

Cave in Serbia

- Serbian: Рајкова пећина Rajkova pećina
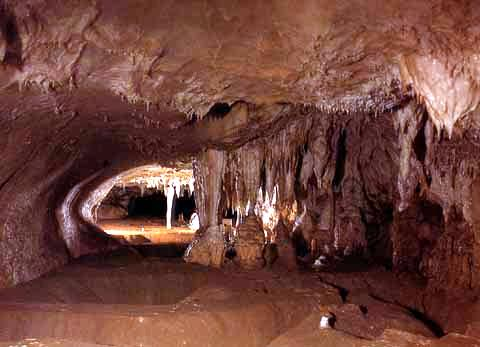
- Interactive map of Rajko's Cave
- Location: Majdanpek, eastern Serbia
- Coordinates: 44.44138°N 21.95317°E

Rajko's Cave (Serbian: Рајкова пећина, Rajkova pećina) is a cave near the copper and gold mines of Majdanpek in eastern Serbia.

== See also ==
- List of caves in Serbia
- The Longest Caves And Pits In Serbia
- Rajko's Cave
