= Gradac (river) =

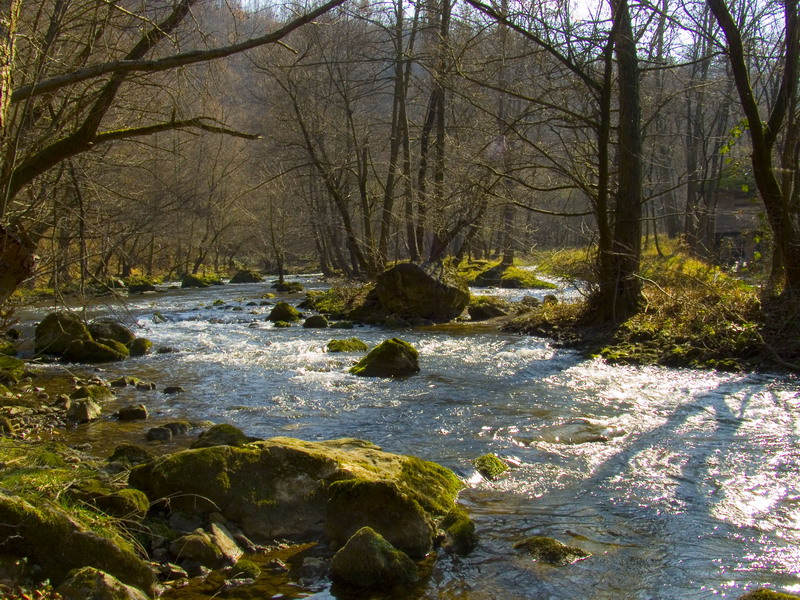

Location
- Country: Serbia

Physical characteristics
- Mouth
  - location: Kolubara
  - coordinates: 44.2669°N 19.8943°E

Basin features
- Progression: Kolubara→ Sava→ Danube→ Black Sea

The Gradac (Serbian: Градац, Gradac, pronounced [ɡrǎːdats]) is a river in western Serbia, a tributary of the Kolubara. It cuts a canyon in south–north direction with a length of 22.7 km. Its measured water course has a length of about 28 km and a total drop of 187 m. The source of the river Gradac is situated at the foot of the Povlen mountain.

== Description ==
The Gradac river gorge, with its source tributaries, the special characteristics and the degree of preservation, is one of the less well known natural values of Serbia. However, it is very highly rated among exponents of nature protection. It lies south of Valjevo and influent in the Kolubara directly, of which it is a right tributary. The river gorge is the habitat of a number of rare plant and animal species. In the river live brook trout, chub, barbel, and crabs. The biggest attraction of Gradac river are undoubtedly the otters. Along the river lay a number of resorts and beaches including Livadica, Ploce, Kriva Vrbe and Sareno platno. Along the river are several watermills and fish ponds located. The railroad from Belgrade to Bar passes through the Gradac river gorge.

== Wildlife ==
Gradac is a home to a variety of animals from poisonous snakes to otters. Here are a few that live in or about the river.

- Mammals: Hedgehog, Forest Mouse, Red Squirrel, Bank Vole, Deer, Hare, Wild Boar, Fox, Otter.
- Birds: Finch, Blackbird, Jay, Quail, Krestel, Tawny Owl, other owls.
- Fish: brown trout, European bullhead, sapača, Wagtail.
- Snakes: Viper, Aesculapius' snake, Water snake.

You can also come across turtles and frogs.

== Caves ==
The gorge of the river has more than 70 karst caves. The Degurić cave is, according to the latest research, the longest and, with its characteristics, the most beautiful cave in the region of the Valjevo karst. In the caves, traces of palaeolithic, and Middle Ages ancient times have been discovered.

== Gallery ==
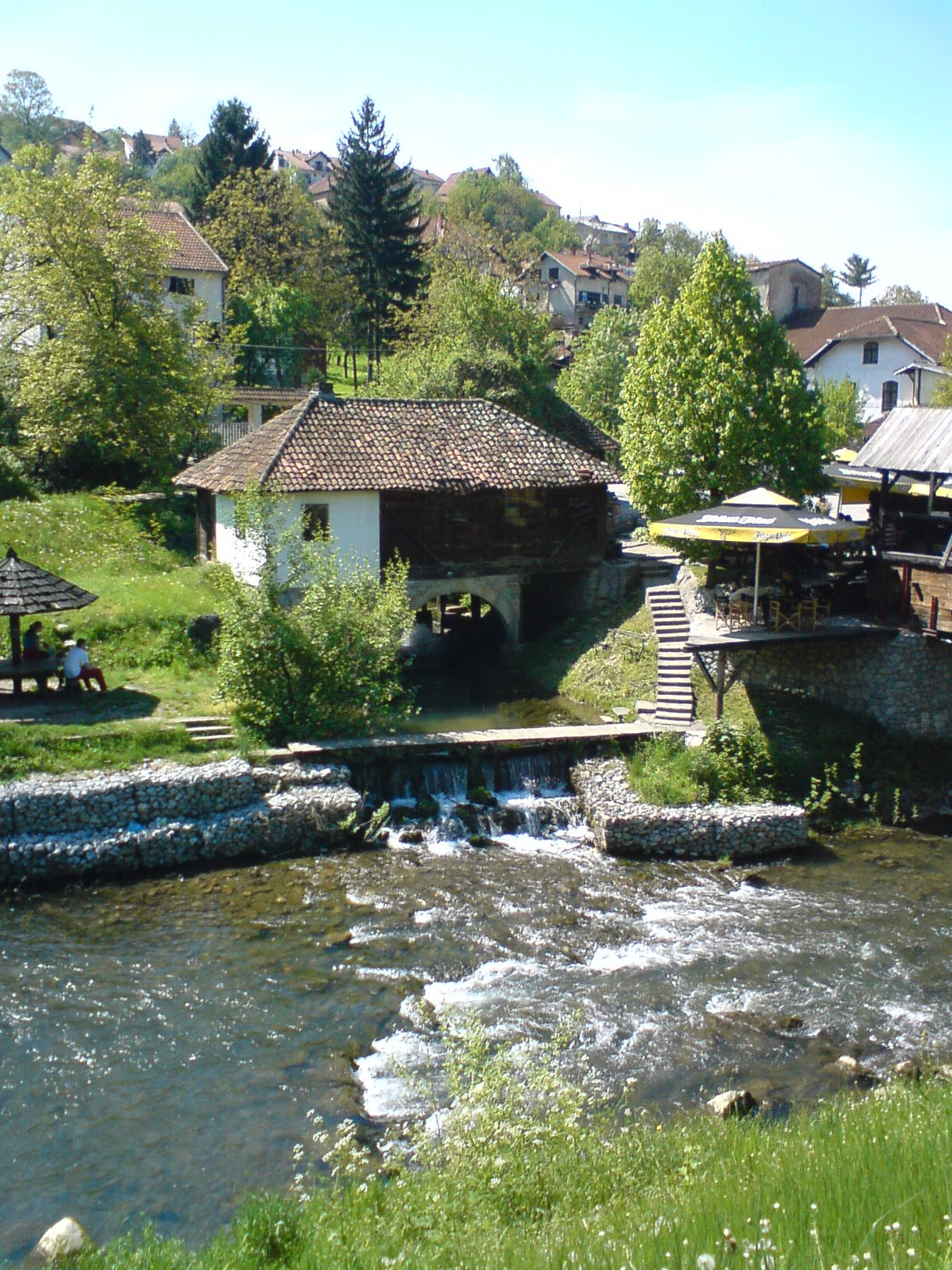
Mill on the river Gradac

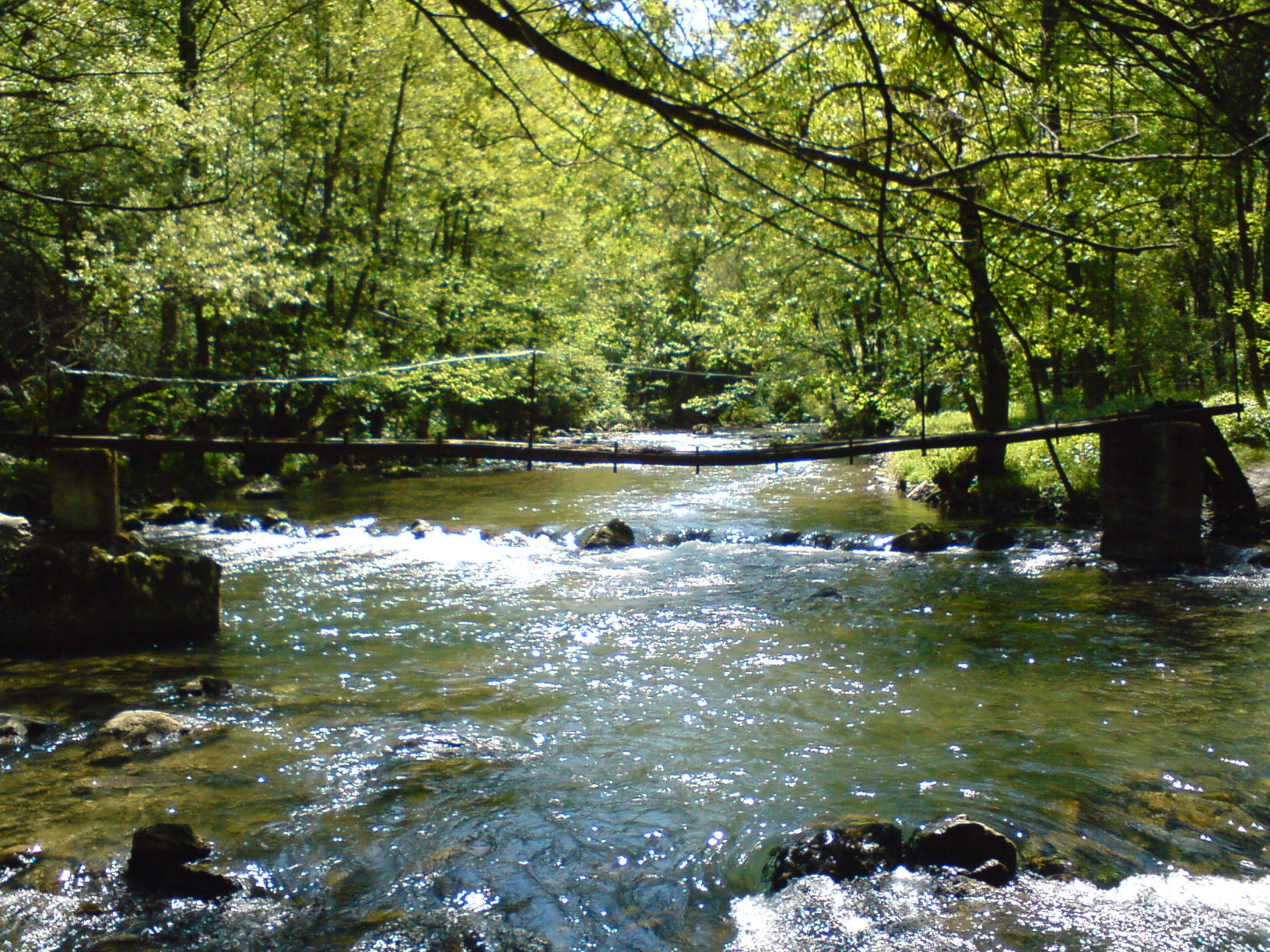
Gradac river bridge

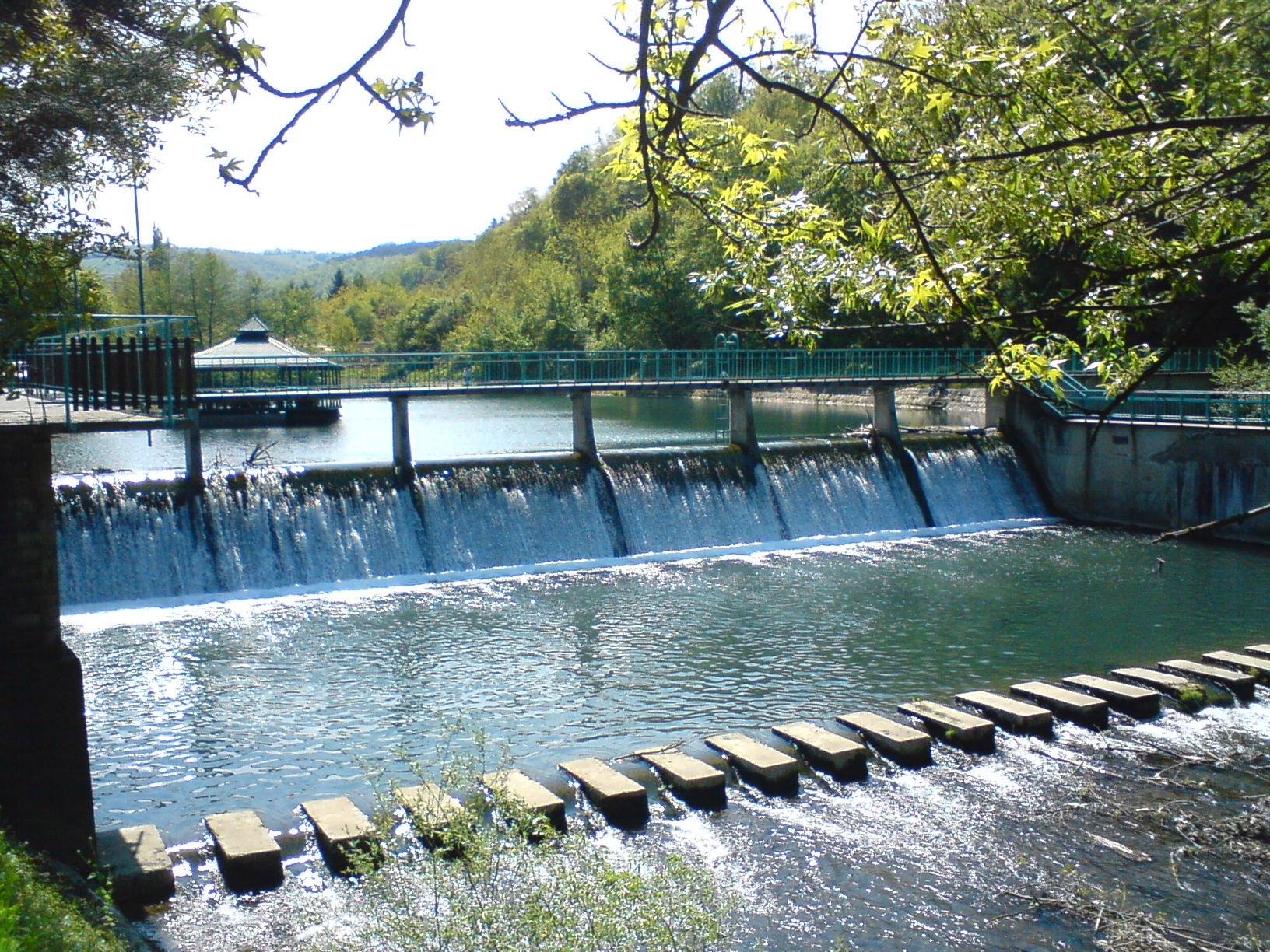
Gradac Dam on river lower flow

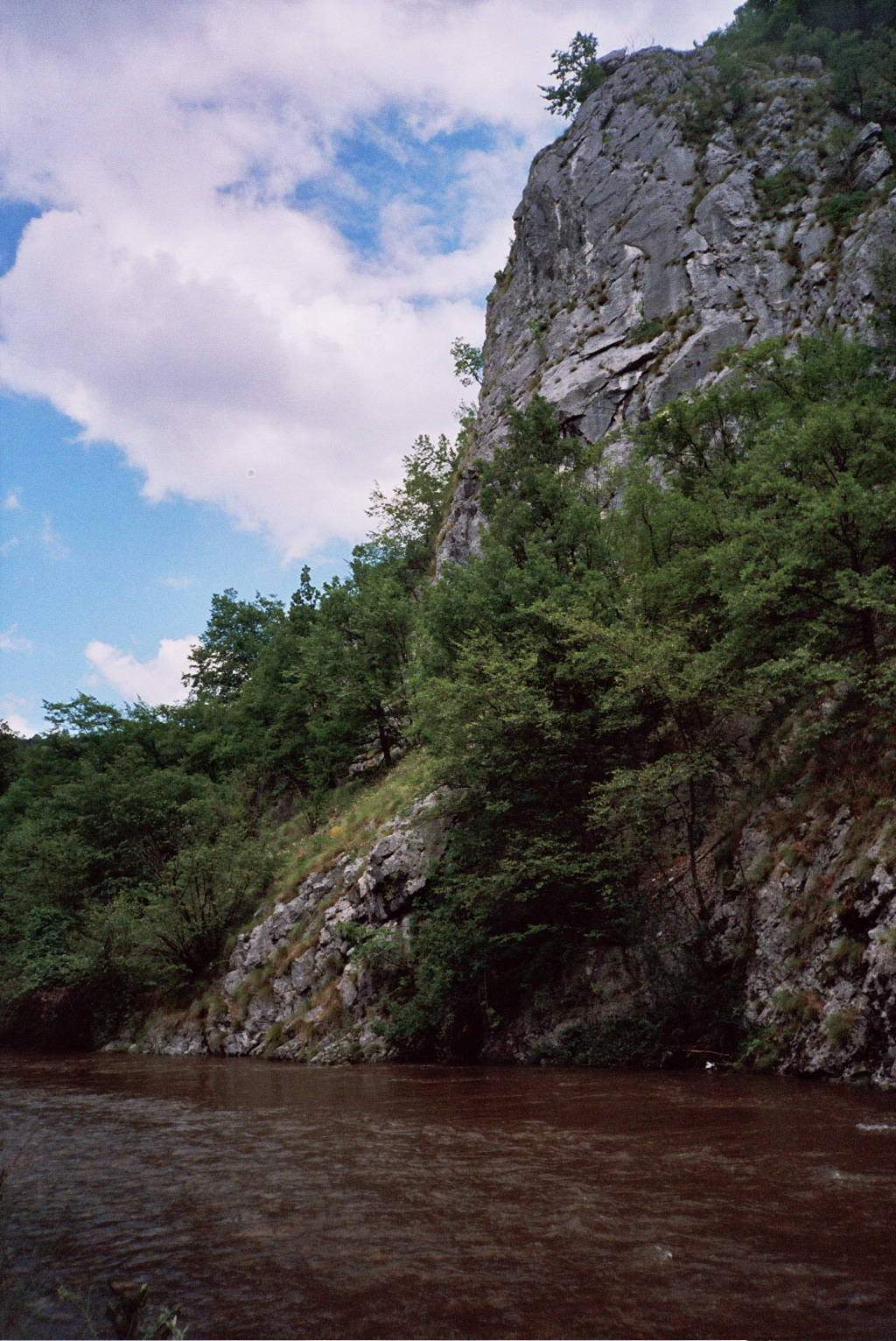
Middle part of the flow

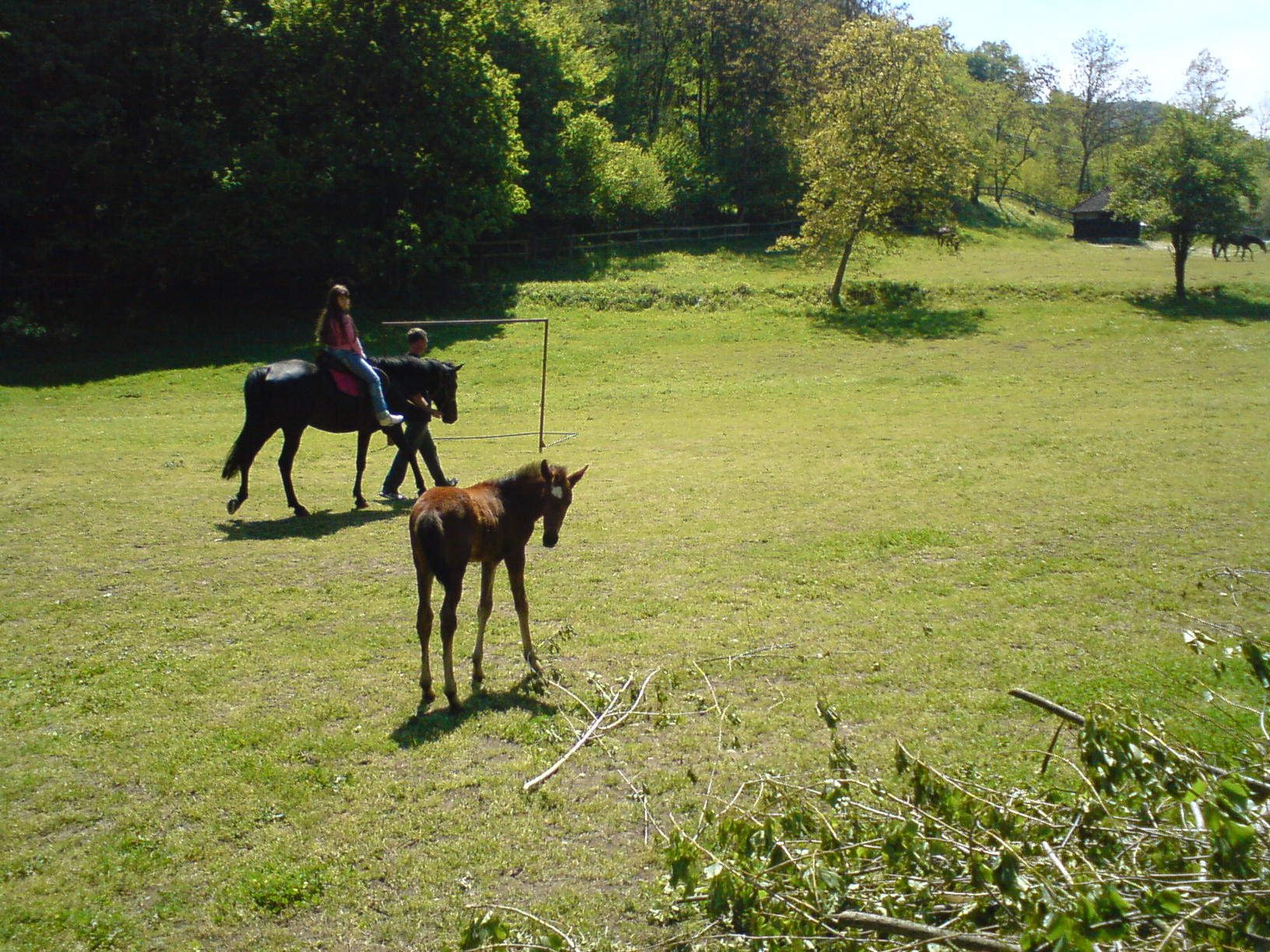
Gradac-Degurić

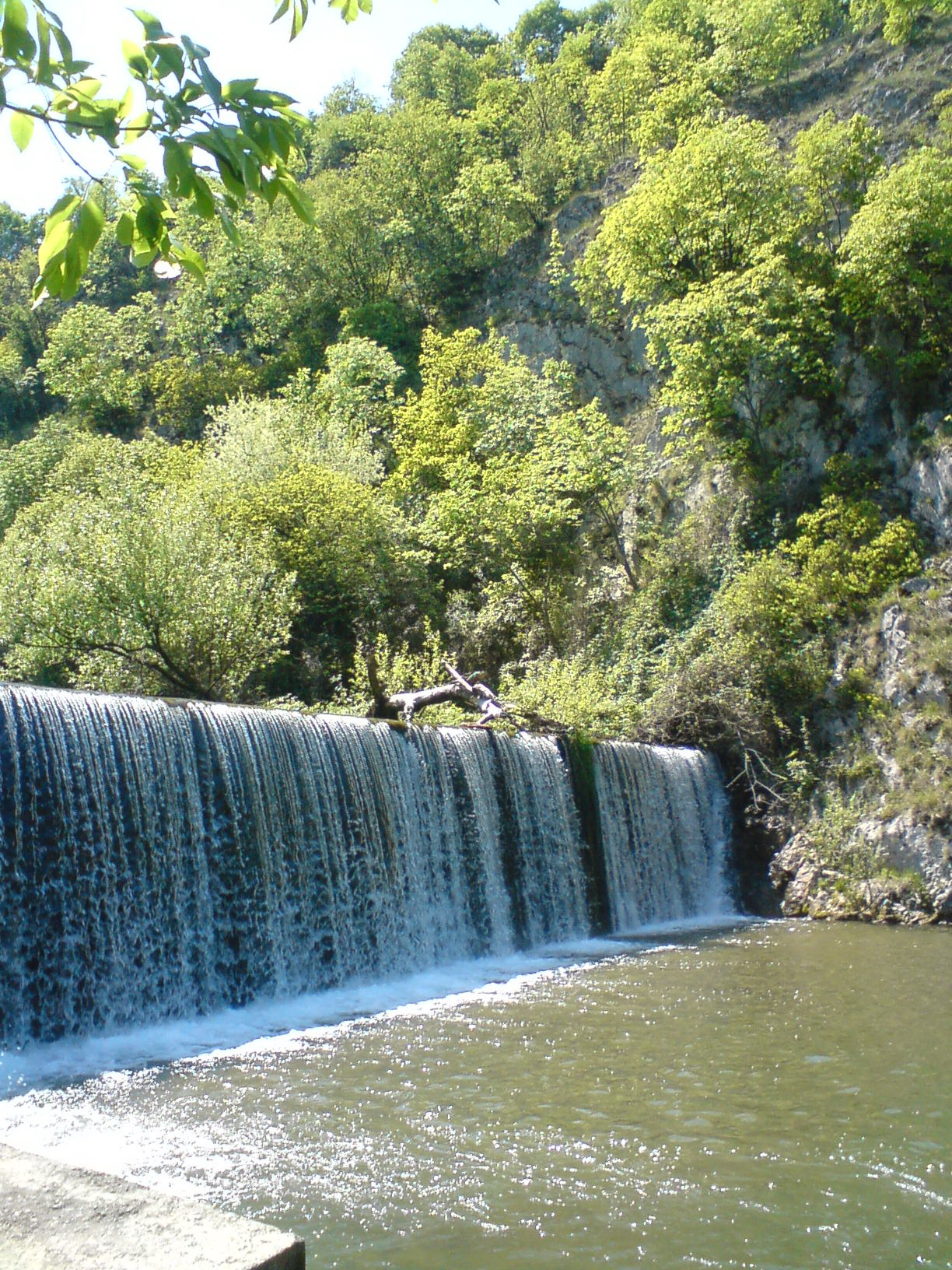
Waterfalls on Gradac

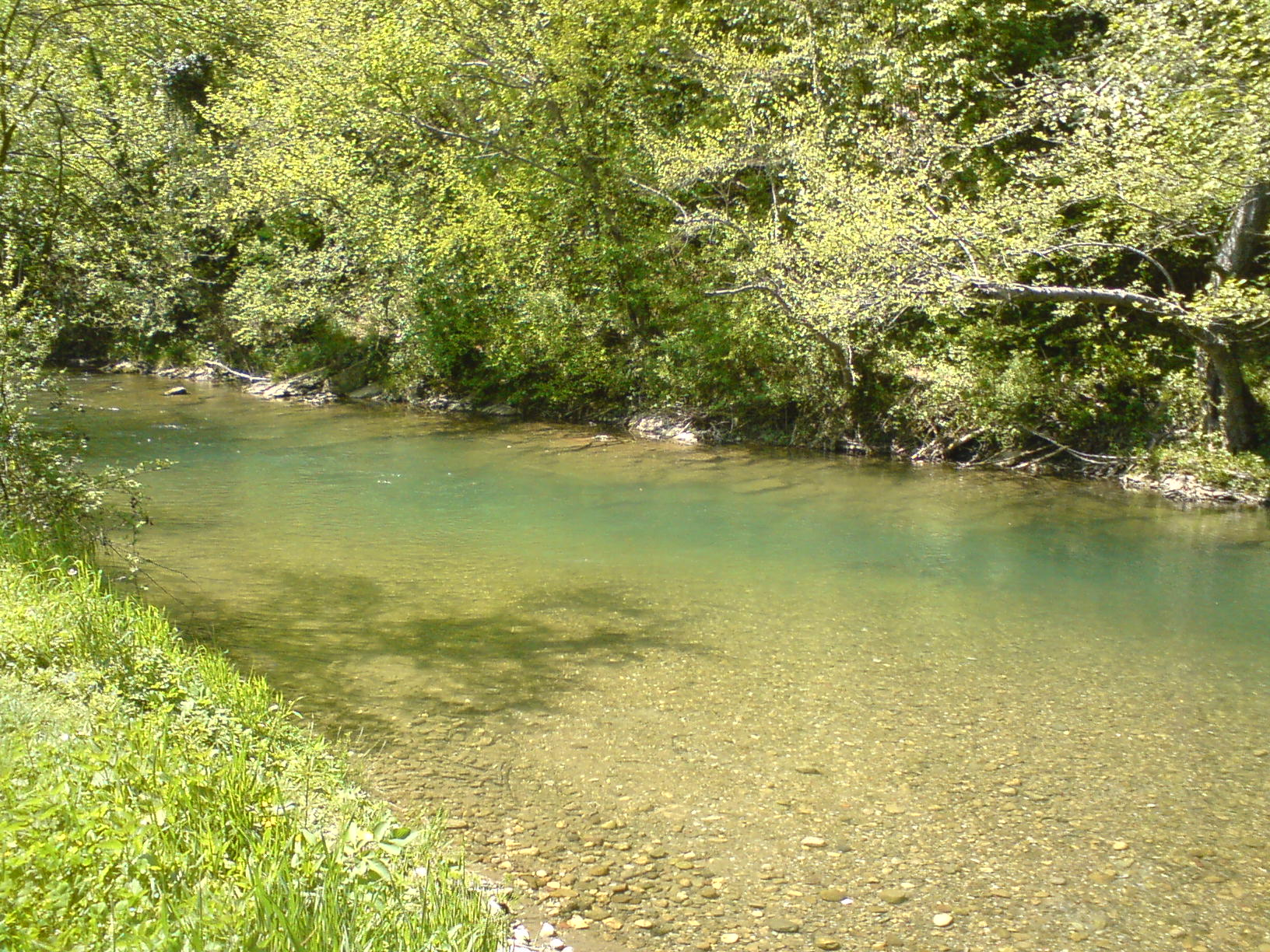
Gradac river lower flow

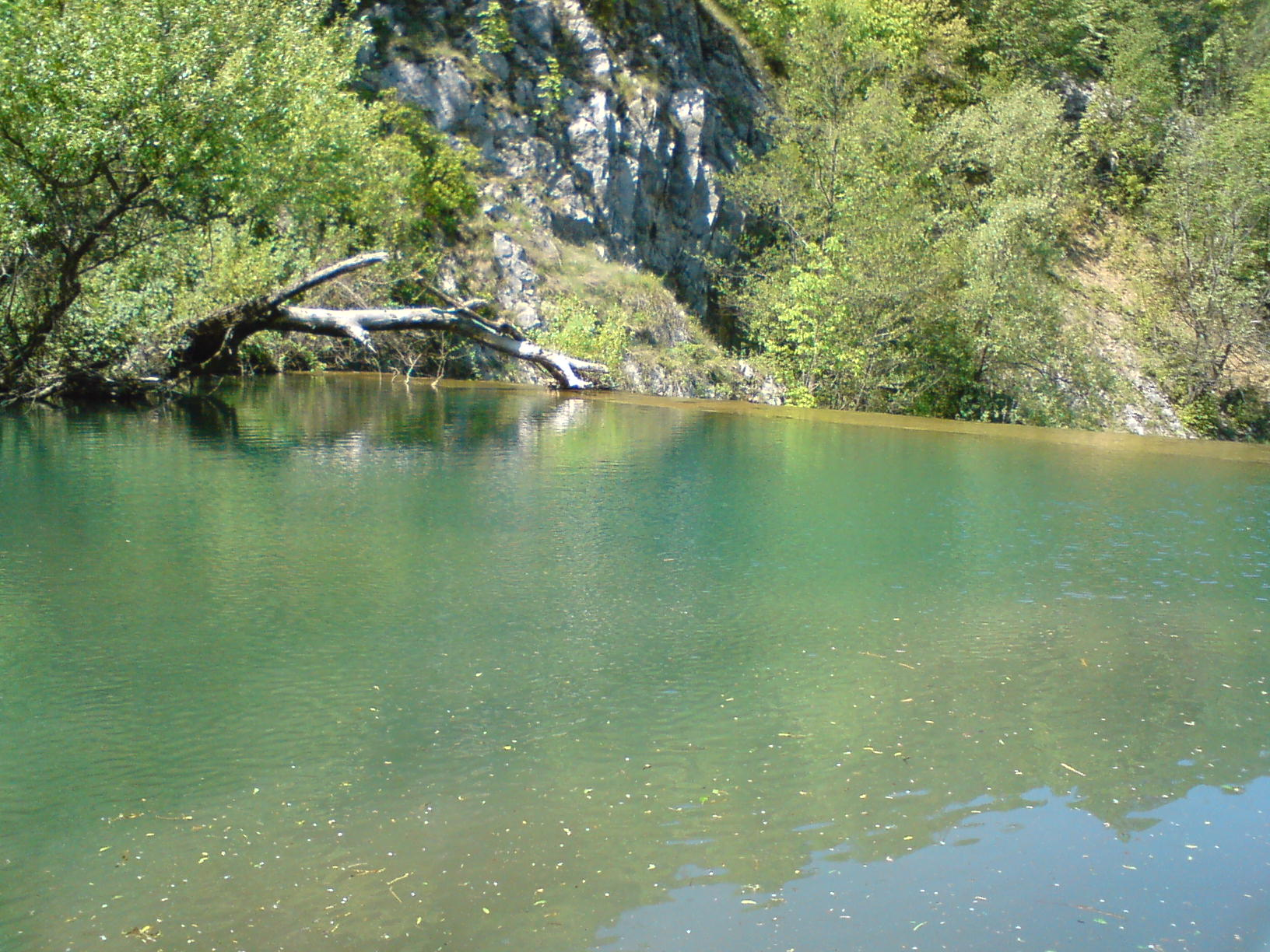
Degurić pond on river Gradac

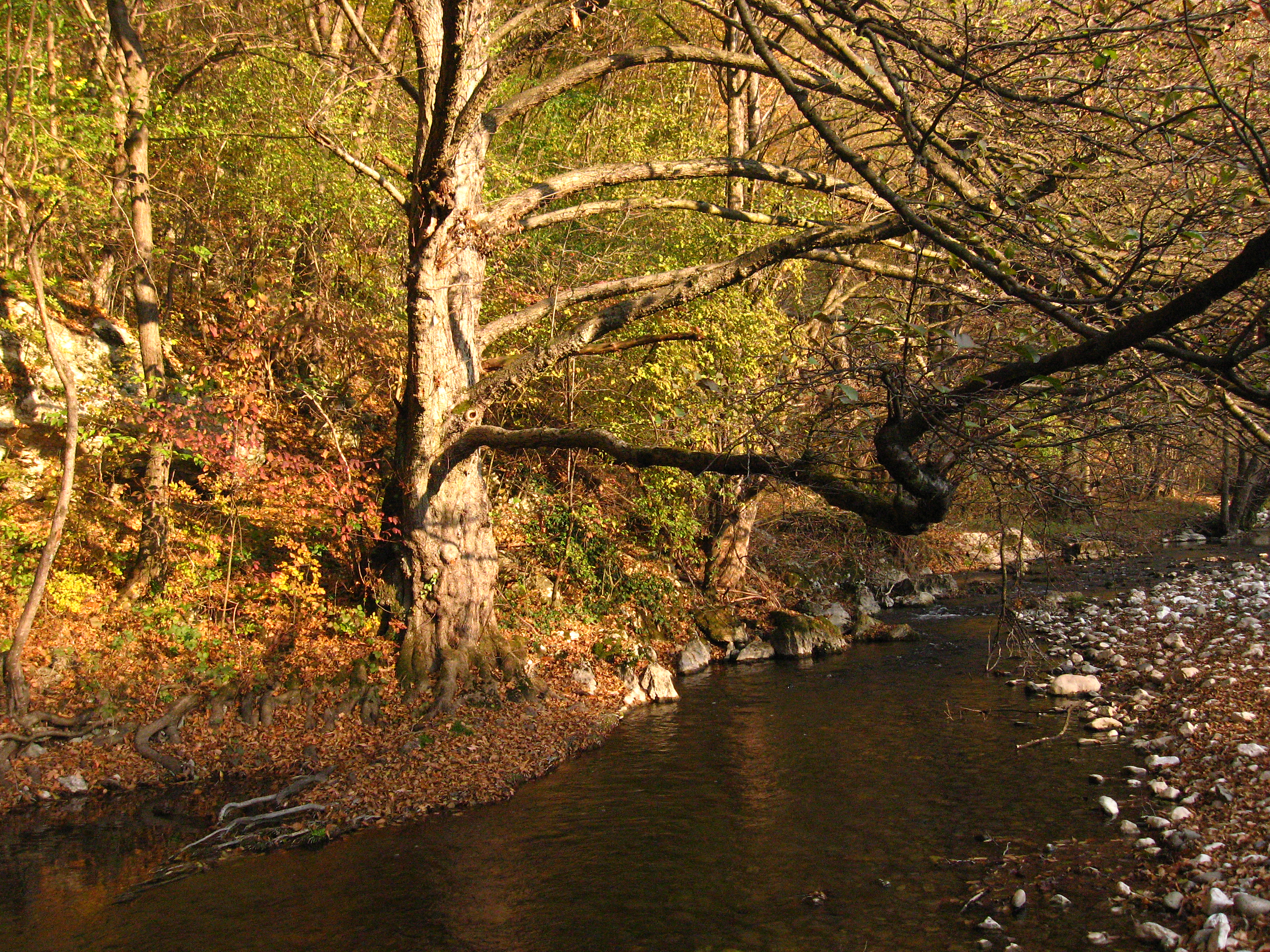
River Gradac - Place Šareno platno

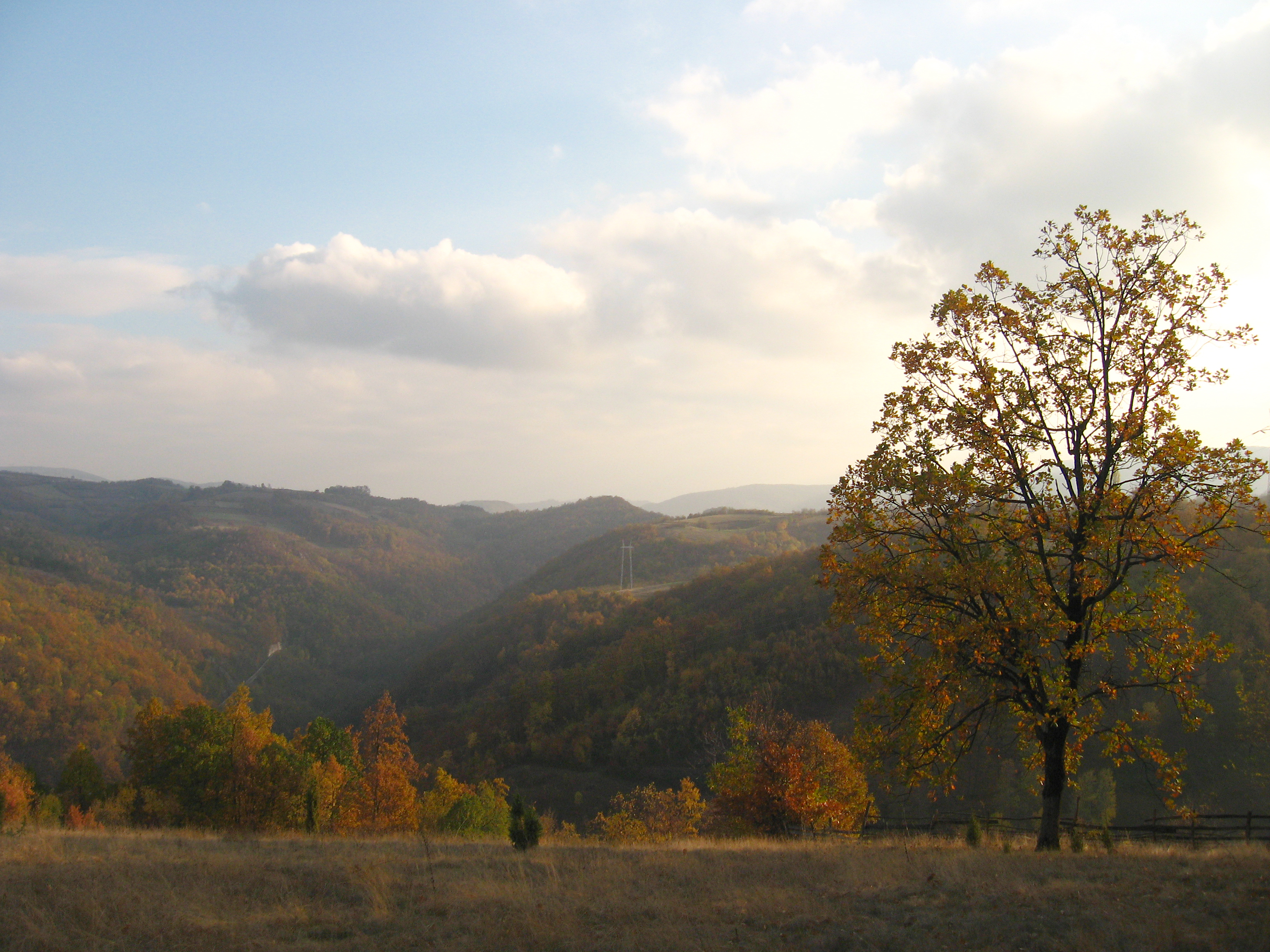
Source of river Gradac - panorama

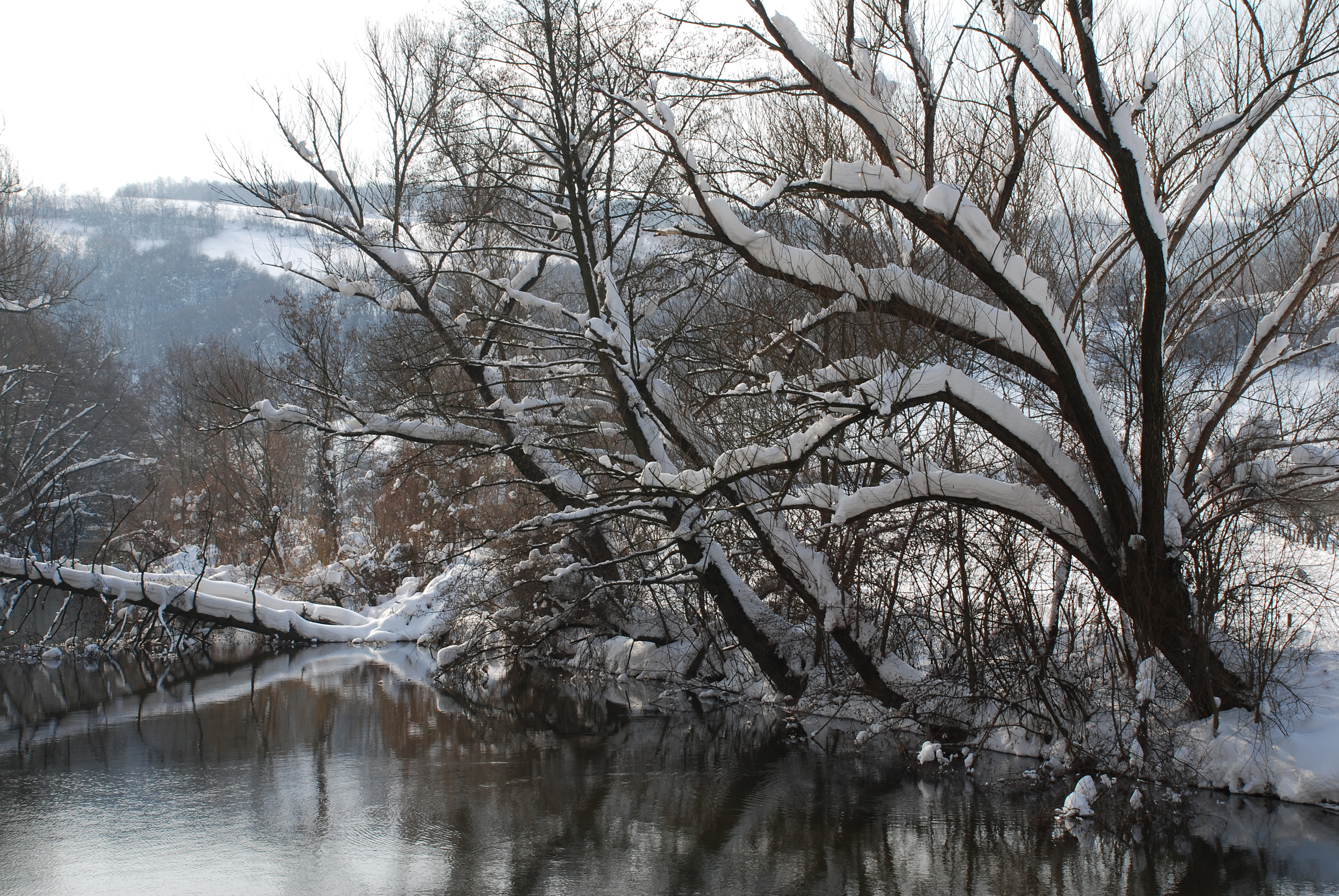
Place Anatema in winter

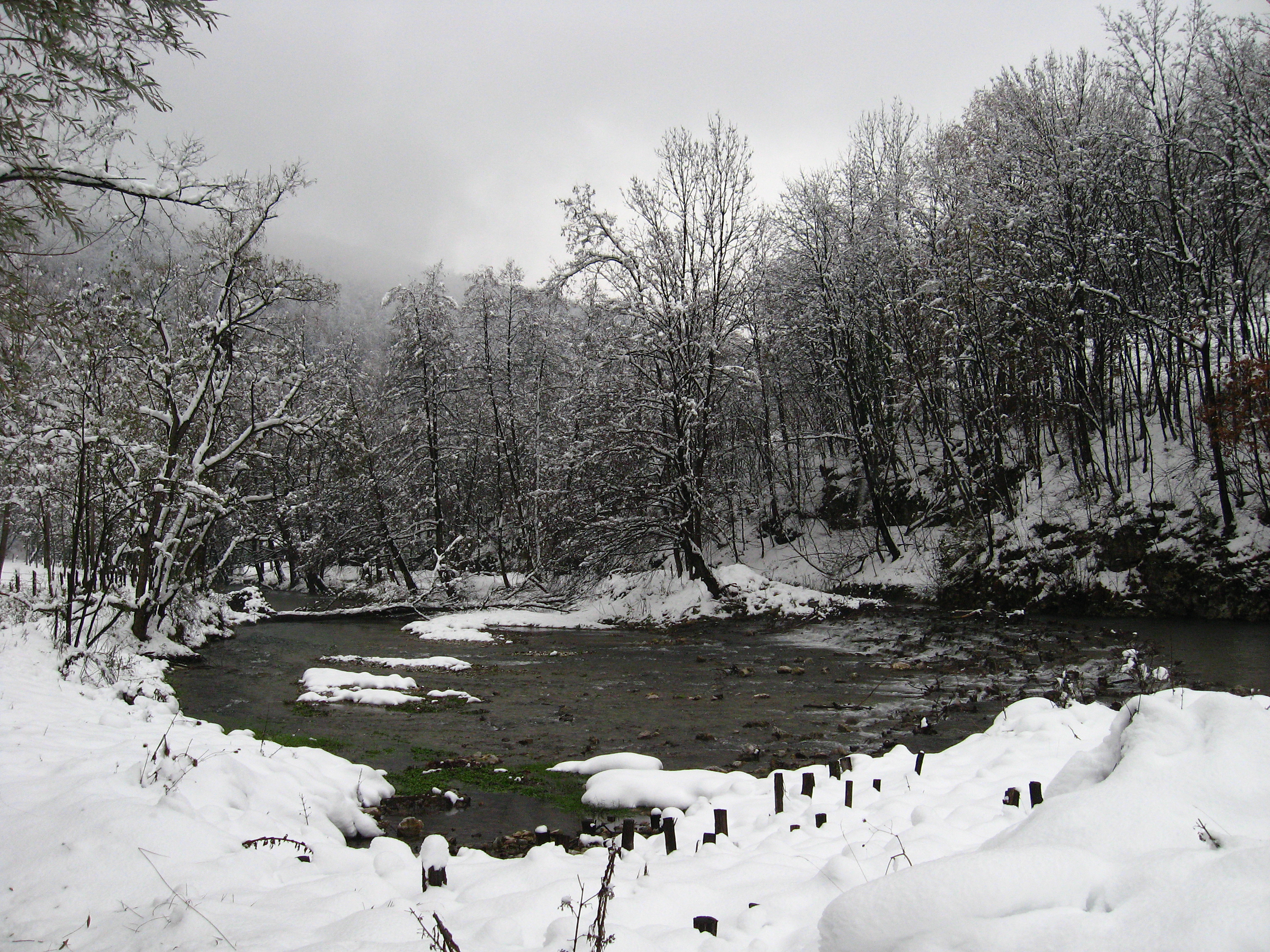
Erode the dam - middle stream of the river Gradac

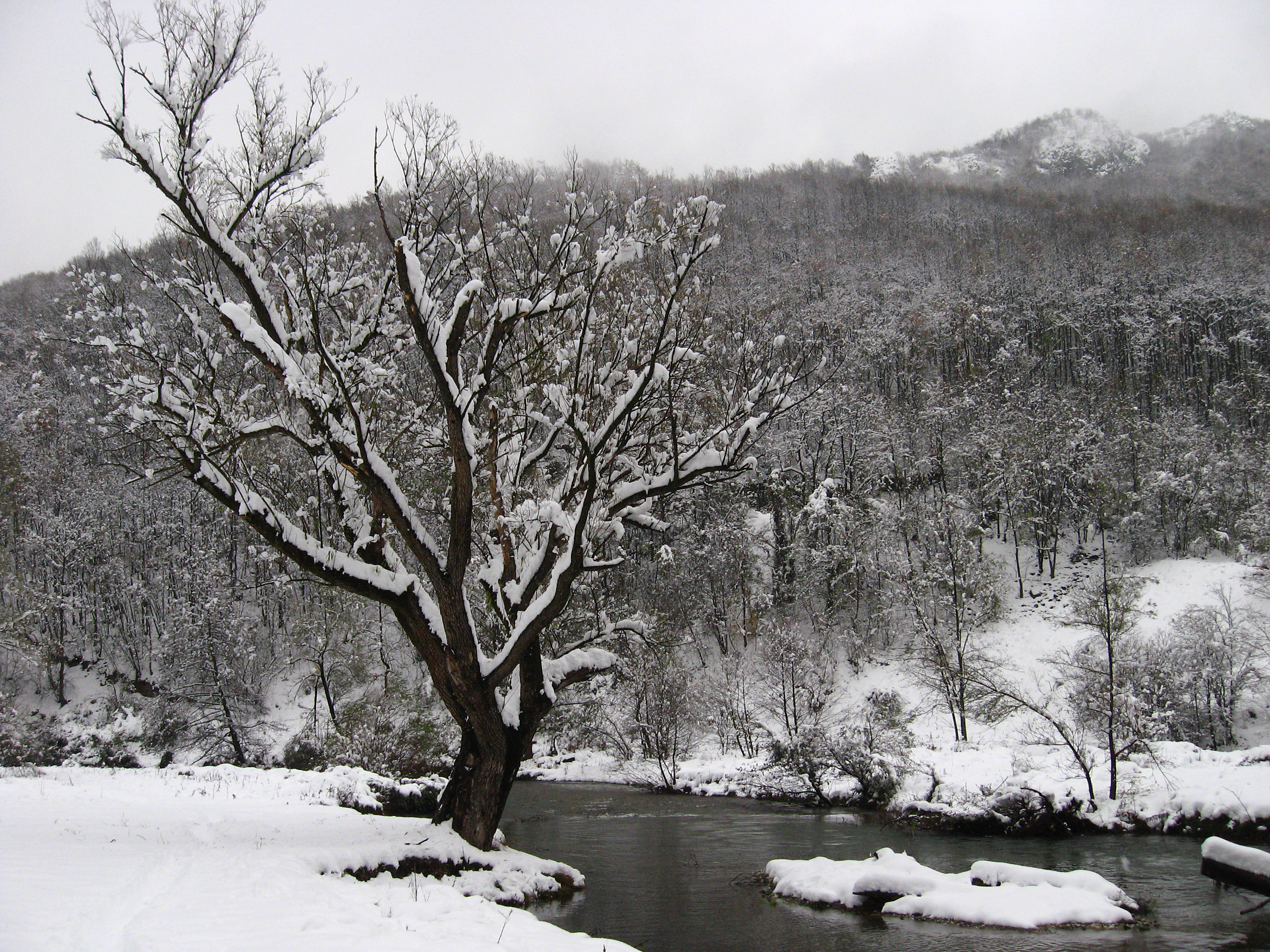
In the monastery Celia - middle stream of the river Gradac

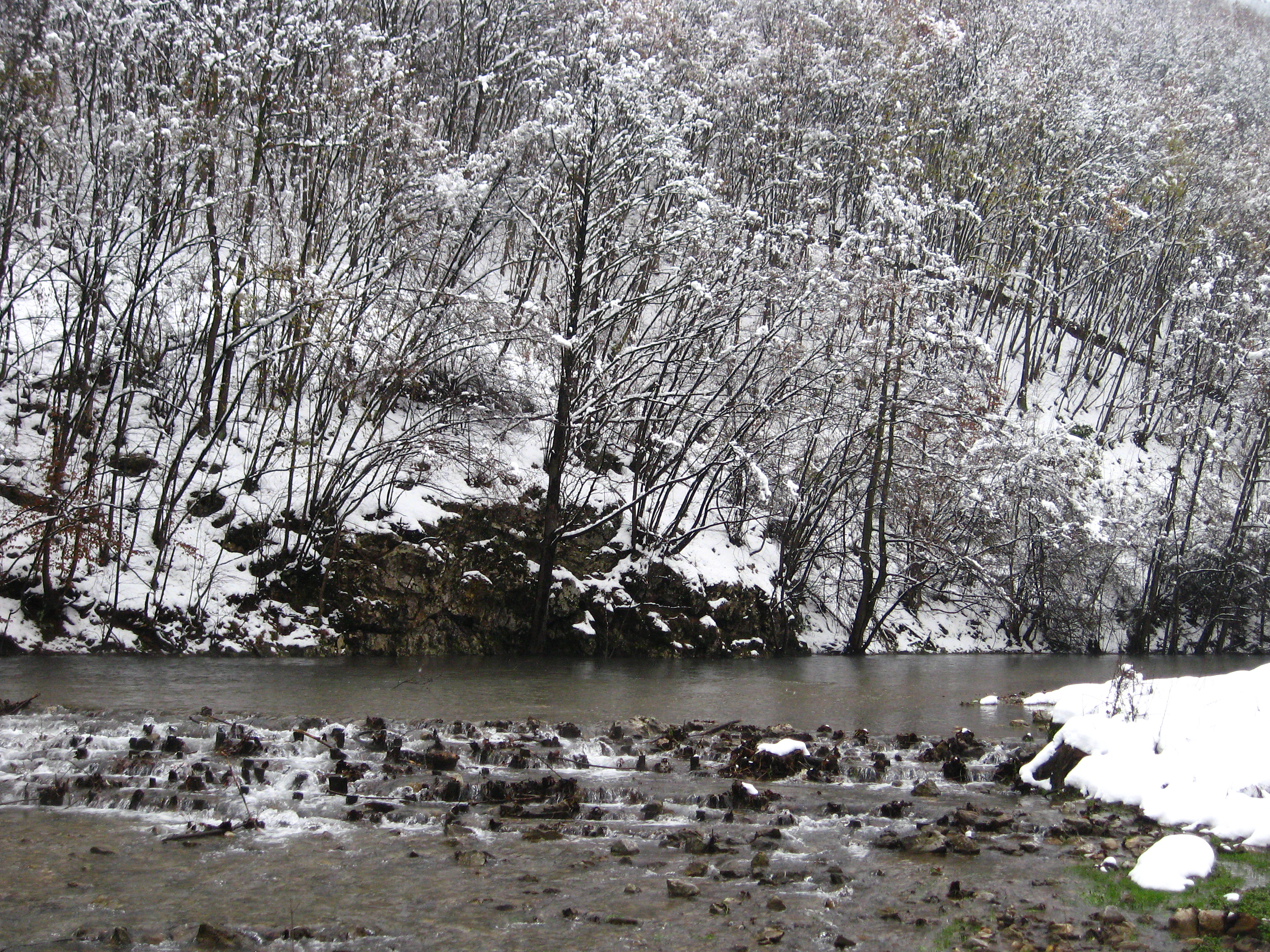
River Gradac - Place Šareno platno

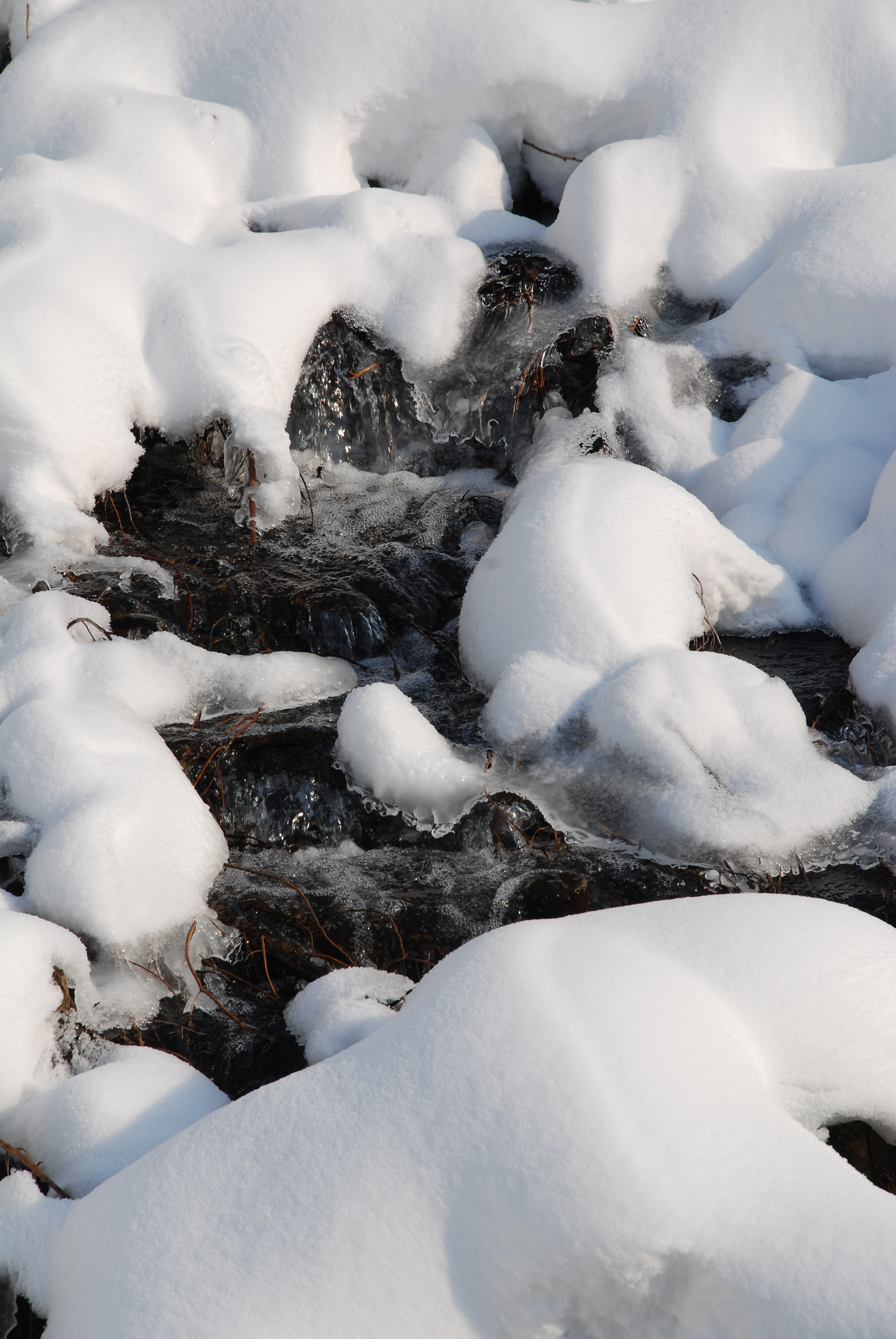
Middle stream of the river Gradac

== See also ==
- List of rivers in Serbia
