= Ceremošnja =

Ceremosnja
- Village
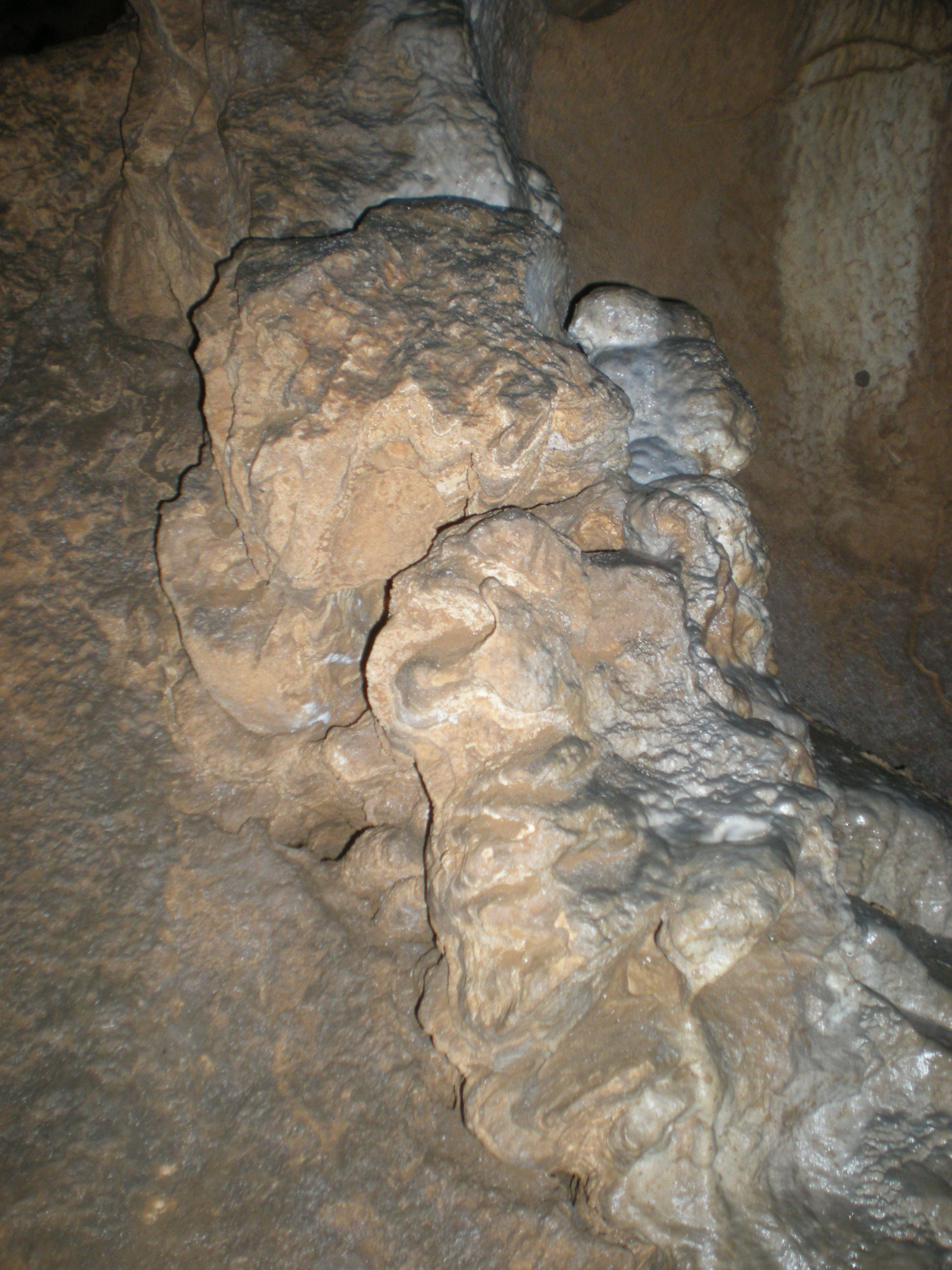
- Ceremošnja Cave

- Location within Serbia
- Coordinates: 44°24′N 21°39′E
- Country: Serbia
- District: Braničevo District
- Municipality: Kučevo
- Time zone: UTC+1 (CET)
  - Summer (DST): UTC+2 (CEST)

Ceremosnja (Serbian: Церемошња) is a village in eastern Serbia, in the vicinity of the town of Kučevo, famous for its cave, which has been open since 1980 for tourists.
