= Gabrovnica =

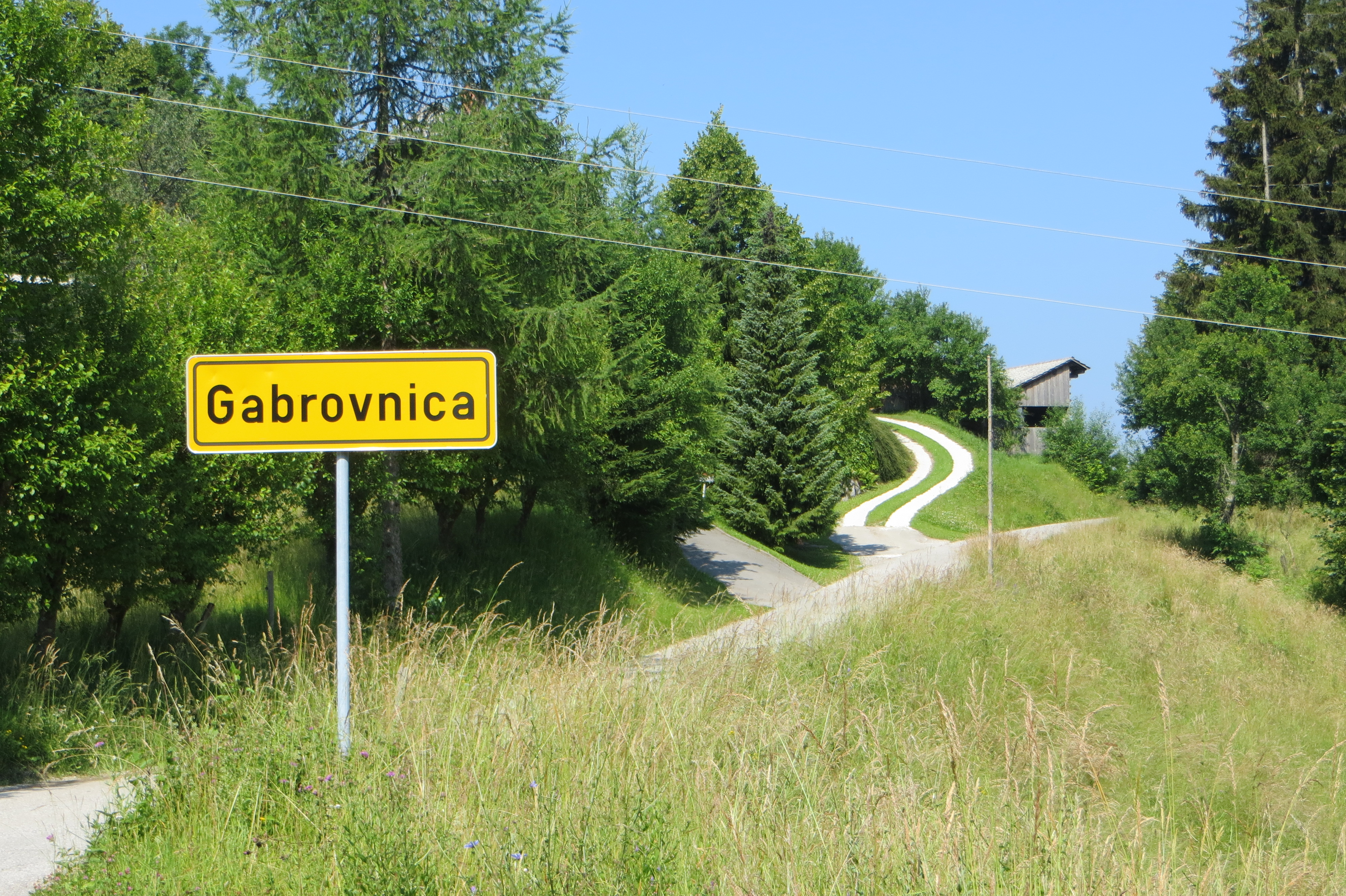

- Location in Slovenia
- Coordinates: 46°11′36.8″N 14°45′34.8″E
- Country: Slovenia
- Traditional region: Upper Carniola
- Statistical region: Central Slovenia
- Municipality: Kamnik
- Elevation: 722 m (2,369 ft)

Population (2002)
  - Total: 40

Gabrovnica (pronounced [ˈɡaːbɾɔu̯nitsa]) is a small settlement in the Municipality of Kamnik in the Upper Carniola region of Slovenia.
