= Potpeće (Užice) =

- Village
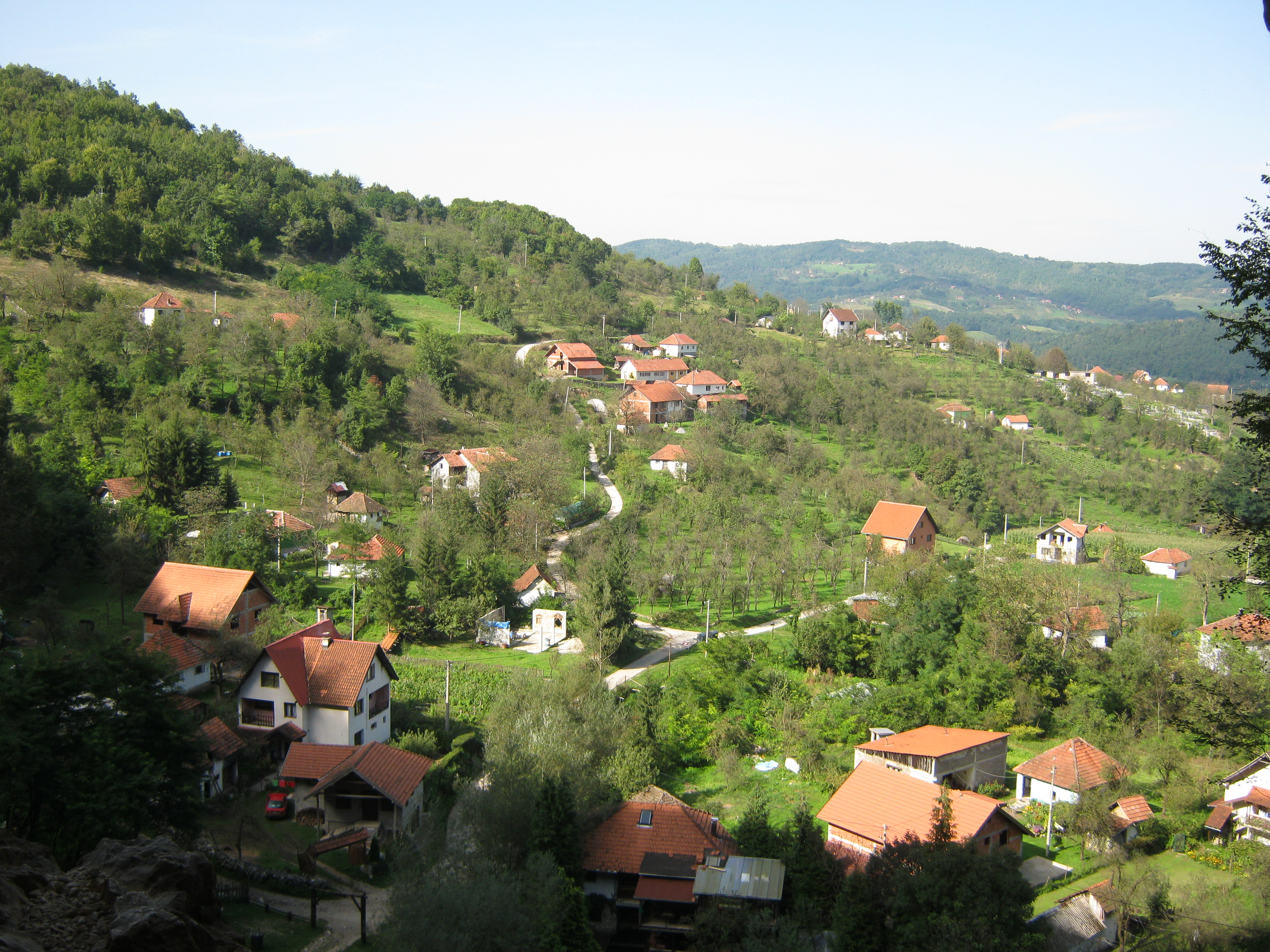
- View from Potpećka pećina cave.

- Location within Serbia
- Coordinates: 43°47′59″N 19°56′03″E
- Country: Serbia
- Elevation: 456 m (1,496 ft)

Population (2011)
  - Total: ▼483
- Time zone: UTC+1 (CET)
  - Summer (DST): UTC+2 (CEST)

Potpeće (Serbian Cyrillic: Потпеће) is a village located in the Užice municipality of Serbia. In the 2011 census, the village had a population of 483.

== Geography ==
The village lies at the foothills of Drežnička Gradina mountain. The Potpećka pećina cave, with an entrance of 50 m high, lies at the outskirts of the village.
