= Lipci rock art =

Cluster of ancient rock paintings in Montenegro

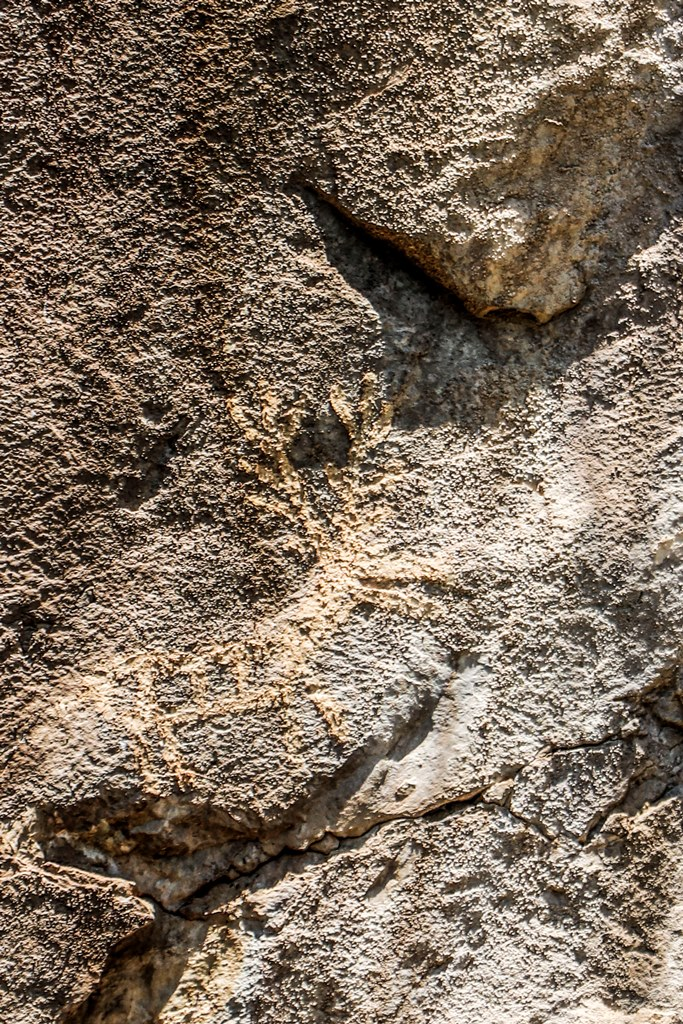
- Deers in the upper scene

- Location within Montenegro
- 42°29′52.74″N 18°39′20.93″E
- Location: Risan

The Lipci rock art is a cluster of ancient rock paintings, situated next to the tiny settlement of Lipci about 2 km west of Risan, in the bay of Kotor in Montenegro. The scientific discovery of the site in 1961 is credited to scholar Pavle Mijović.

== Geography ==
The site is located about a half km away from the seashore in the northern outskirts of Lipci, where a rocky overhang rises sharply some 7 m above the surrounding plain. At the top of this overhang, a receding rock wall face clings to a narrow ledge. And it is here that the Lipci rock paintings can be seen. The site is in a neglected state and in need of serious conservation.

== Description ==
The paintings consist of two independent scenes; one painted directly on the overhang and the other on the rock projection below.

The upper scene shows a realistic view of a herd of stags and does in its natural surroundings walking in biologically fixed order to their haunts.

The antlered stags in the lower scene are clearly recognizable despite the schematic drawing. They are calm, human figures apparently accompanying them while they feed. This scene also contains four swastika-shaped geometric icons with a complex geometric pattern of vertically and horizontally criss-crossed lines below.

Each depicted animal is roughly 35 to 45 cm long, painted schematically in straight and angular lines on the rock surface using a local lime stained red by iron ore. Concerning the icons, scholars agree that they are in fact not swastikas at all, but a reflection of the general shape of the winded Bay of Kotor, constituting a sort of nautical map with the narrow passage of the Verige Strait as the centerpoint. The criss-crossing lines and curves are interpreted by scholars as an outline of a ship with sails.

Based on stylistic characteristics and comparisons to other similar drawings, some scholars think they are from the Bronze Age (beginning in 1800 BCE in the Balkan region). However, comparisons with the rock Drawings in Valcamonica of the Italian Alps allow other scholars to suggest that the most plausible age for the Lipci rock art is the 10th century BCE.

== Gallery ==
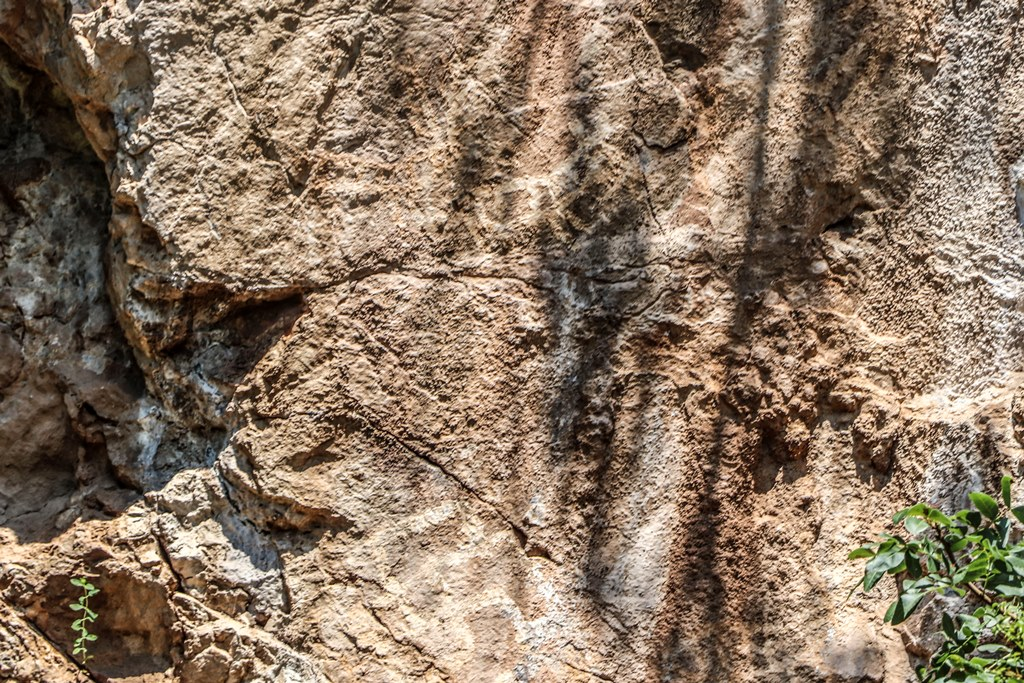
Deers in the lower scene

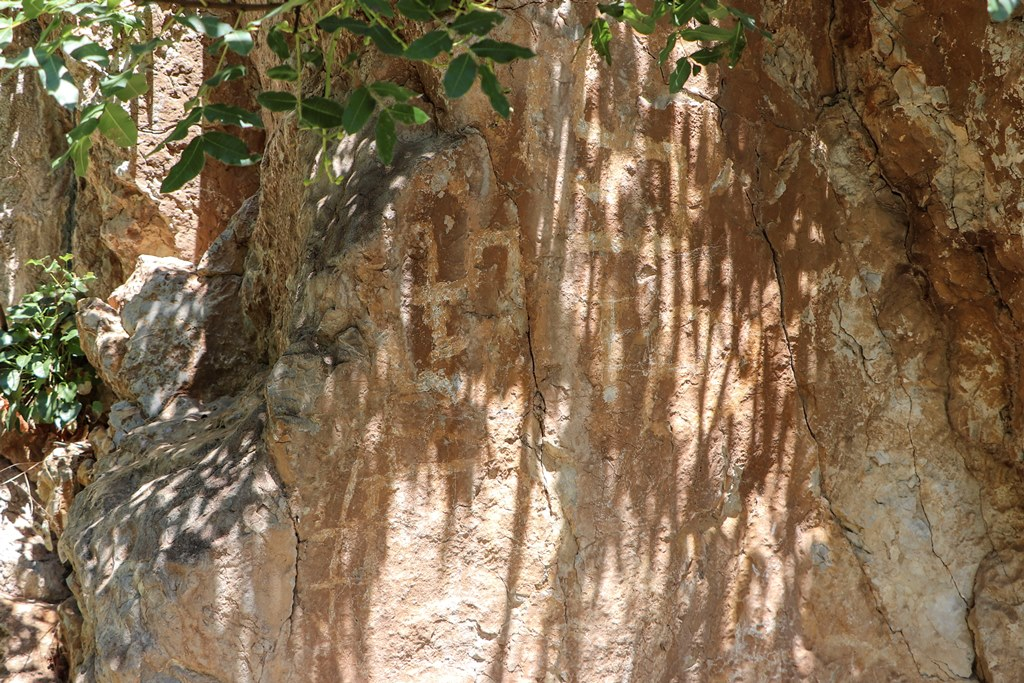
Swastika-like items
