= Dljin =

- Village
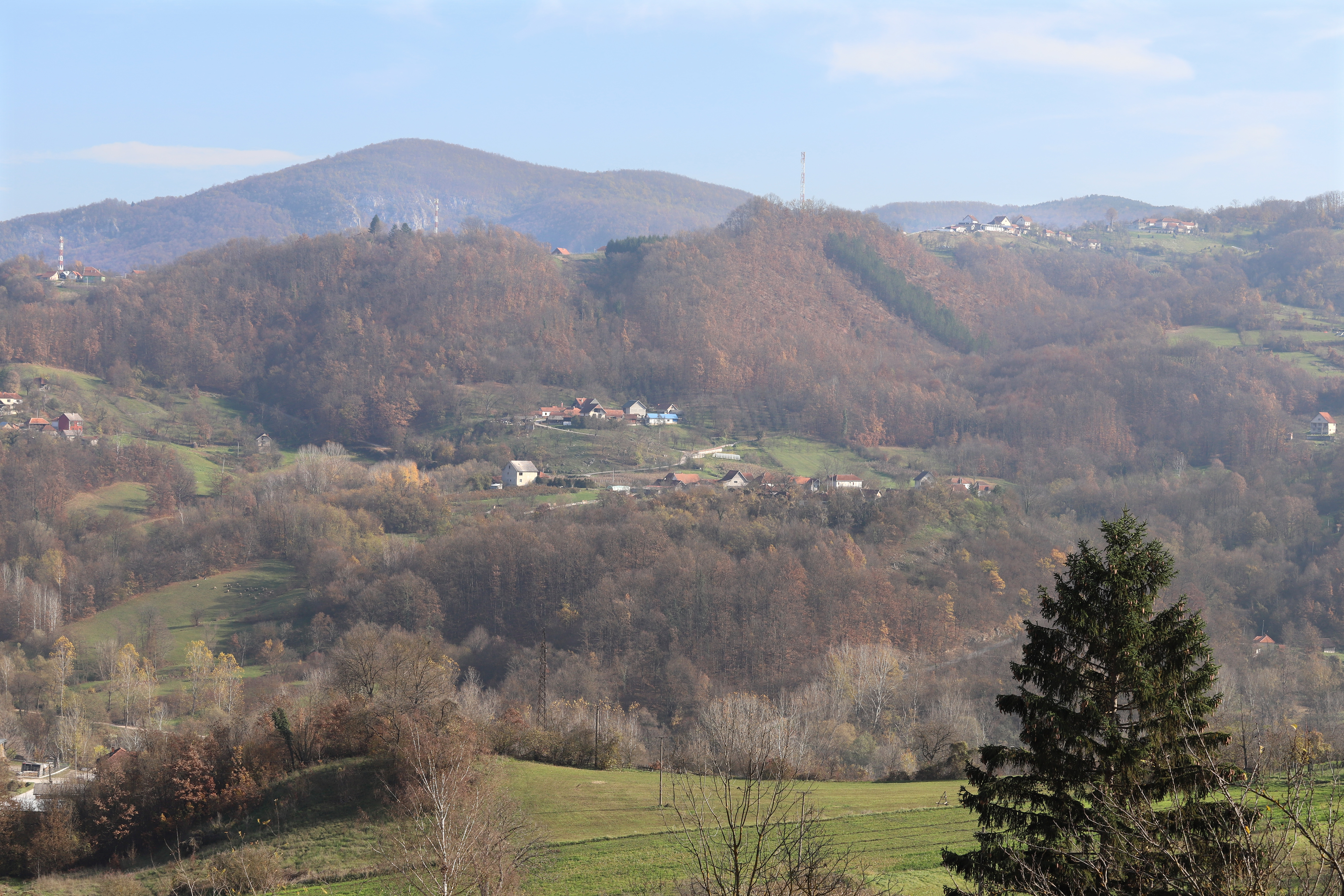
- Dljin, Lučani

- Location within Serbia
- Coordinates: 43°52′13″N 20°07′33″E
- Country: Serbia
- District: Moravica District
- Municipality: Lučani

Area
  - Total: 14.86 km^{2} (5.74 sq mi)

Population (2011)
  - Total: 935
  - Density: 62.9/km^{2} (163/sq mi)
- Time zone: UTC+1 (CET)
  - Summer (DST): UTC+2 (CEST)

Dljin is a village in the municipality of Lučani, Serbia. According to the 2011 census, the village has a population of 935 people.
