= Drežnička Gradina =

Mountain in Serbia

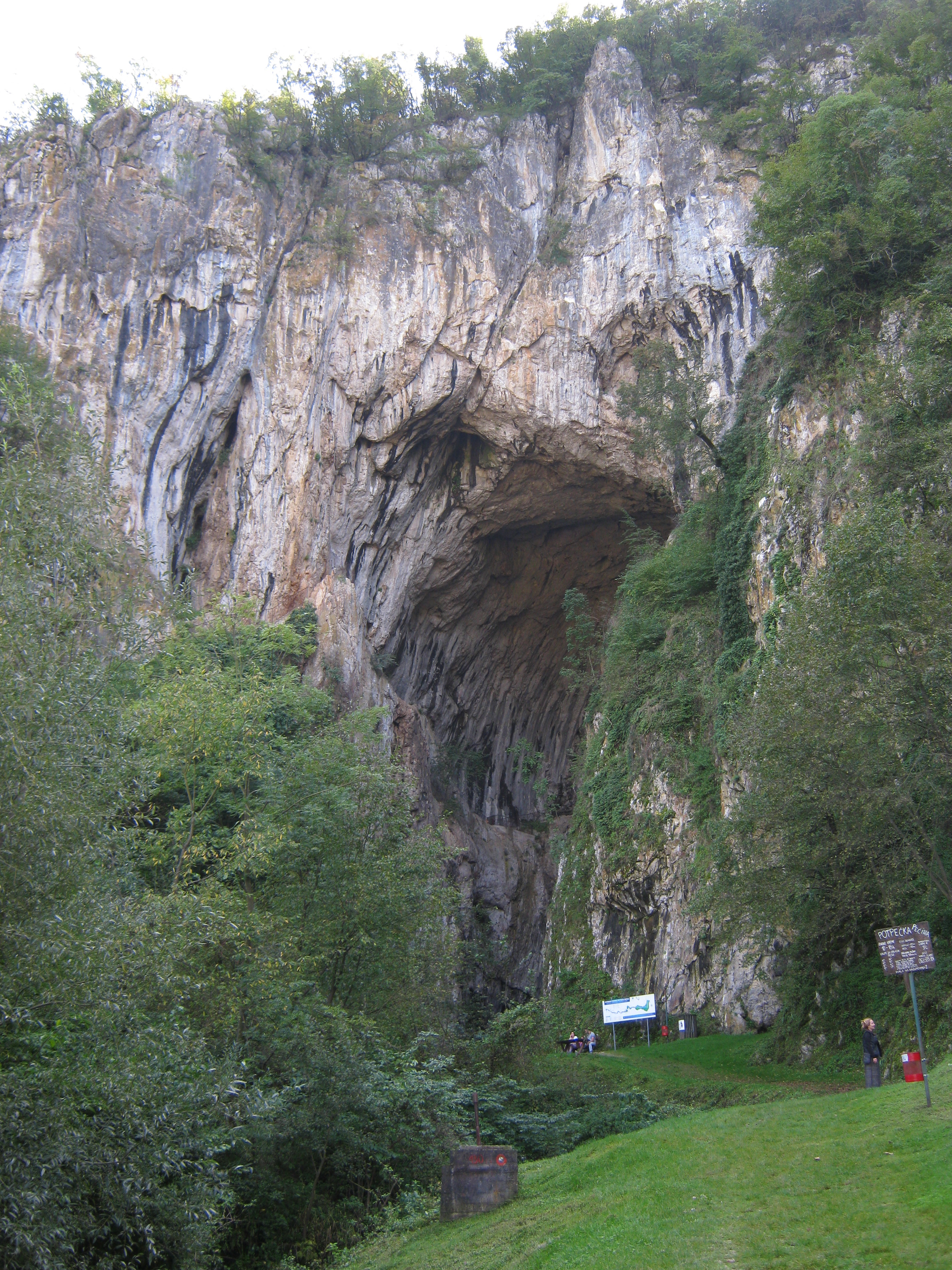
- Main entrance of the Potpeć Cave

Highest point
- Elevation: 932 m (3,058 ft)
- Coordinates: 43°47′02″N 19°56′12″E

Geography
- Location within Serbia
- Location: Western Serbia
- Parent range: Dinaric Alps

Drežnička Gradina (Serbian Cyrillic: Дрежничка Градина) is a mountain in western Serbia, located near the town of Požega. Its highest peak, Gradina, has an elevation of 932 m (3,058 ft) above sea level. On the cone-shaped hilltop, there is a small stone-built pyramid erected as monument to Yugoslav Partisans died in a battle against German forces in August 1941, at the time of the Republic of Užice. A prominent feature on the mountain is the Potpeć Cave (Serbian Cyrillic: Потпећка пећина), located near the village of Potpeće.

== Potpeće Cave ==
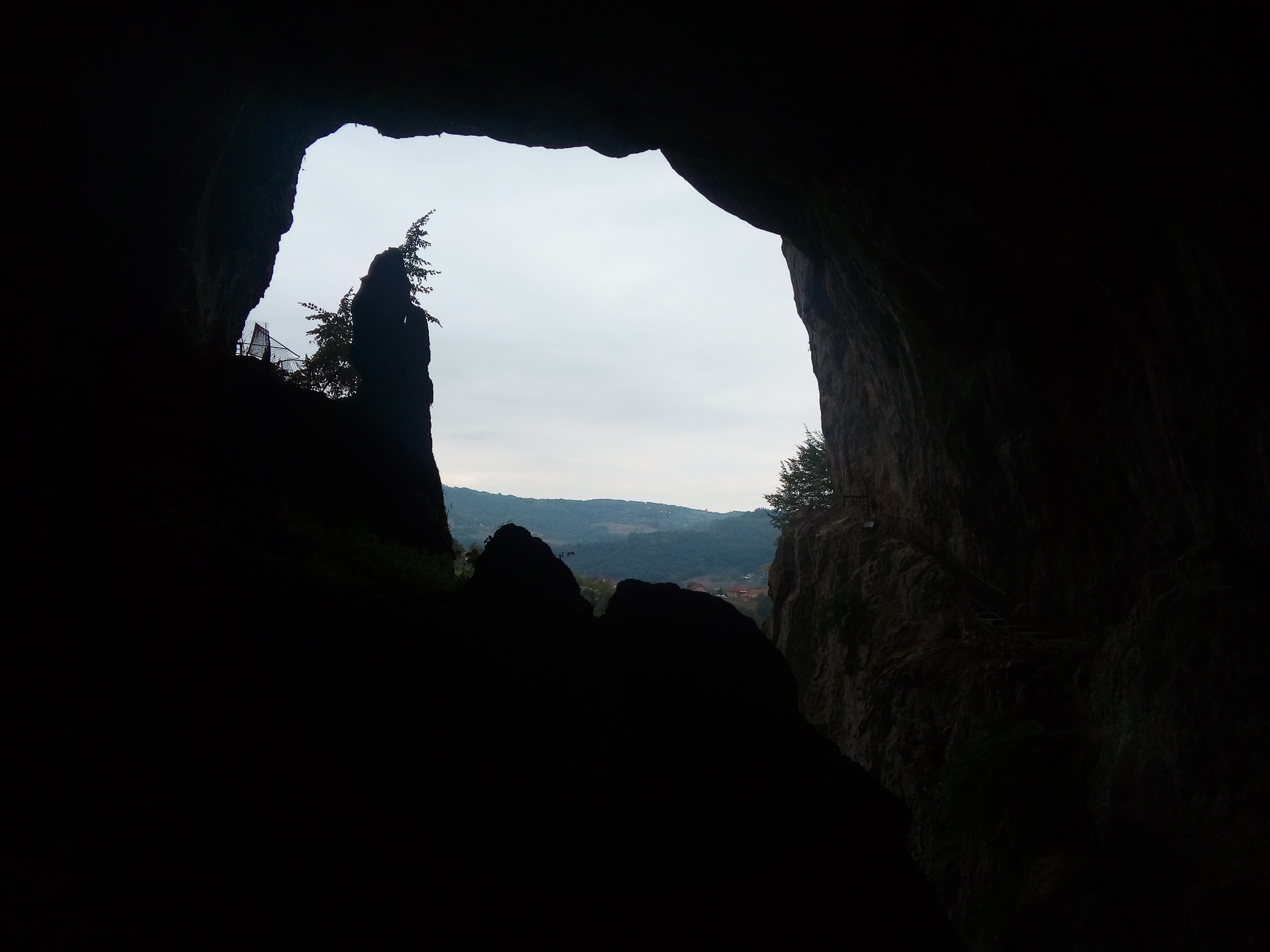
View from the inside of the Potpeć Cave

The main entrance of the Potpeće Cave (43°47′44″N 19°55′59″E) is 72 m (236 ft) tall, and is the largest of all caves in the Balkans. Seen from the inside, the main entrance resembles the shape of the mammoth. Apart from the main, upper entrance for tourists, there is a smaller, lower entrance into an underground lake, which overflows in rainy seasons, creating an intermittent water flow called Petnica, flowing into Đetinja river. It is just over 1 km (0.62 mi) long. The cave's upper hall has lightened tourist trail, 555 m (1,821 ft) long, reachable by a circular staircase of 750 stairs. The "dry" hall contains stalactites and stalagmites, while the "wet" section is still geologically active, and is protected from outer atmosphere by an iron gate. It keeps the constant temperature of 9 °C (48 °F), with high humidity. Largest hall in the still active section is called Cvijić's Hall, after the geographer Jovan Cvijić. A rare form of speleothems, helictites, developed in the cave. The speleothems are given jocular names: Single guy, Uncle Ljuba and his cats, Eagle on the rock, Snow White and the seven dwarfs. The cave is protected as the natural monument.

In the lower section of the cave, artifacts were discovered which show that the Neolithic people inhabited the cave. The upper cave, which is harder to access, was also used but as a shelter, not as a habitat. The cave was explored by Jovan Žujović in 1893, Jovan Cvijić in 1913 (who left most valuable descriptions) and by Radenko Lazarević from 1957 to 1978. It was adapted and opened for visitors in 1984. The cave's open season is from April to November and it had 7,000 visitors in 2016 and 8,000 in 2019. The plans from 2020 include re-activation of the disabled exit pathway and construction of an elevator. Additional attractions in the vicinity of the cave include a dozen of trout fish ponds along the Petnica and the adjoining restaurants, so as the village tourism in the villages of Potpeć, and especially, Zlakuse, known for its pottery. The Petnica has a crystal clear water rich in oxygen, with temperature varying from 8 to 16 °C (46 to 61 °F), depending on a season. Surrounding area is inhabited by otters and herons.

== See also ==
- List of mountains in Serbia
- List of longest Dinaric caves
