= Degurić Cave =

Cave in Serbia

Coordinates: 44°14′17″N 19°53′1″E

The Degurić cave is, according to the latest research, the longest cavern in the region of Valjevo karst. Through the main channel stream flows passing through six siphons. The first siphon is 6m deep, and six siphon is the deepest one and it is not passed through. Entrance channel is, up to the first siphon, 450.8m long. Total length of all channels (from entrance to third siphon) is 2027.7m. Especially interesting and the most attractive part of the cave is place where side channels, and lake in front of the second siphon meet. Research of Degurić cave has not been finished yet.

== Gallery ==
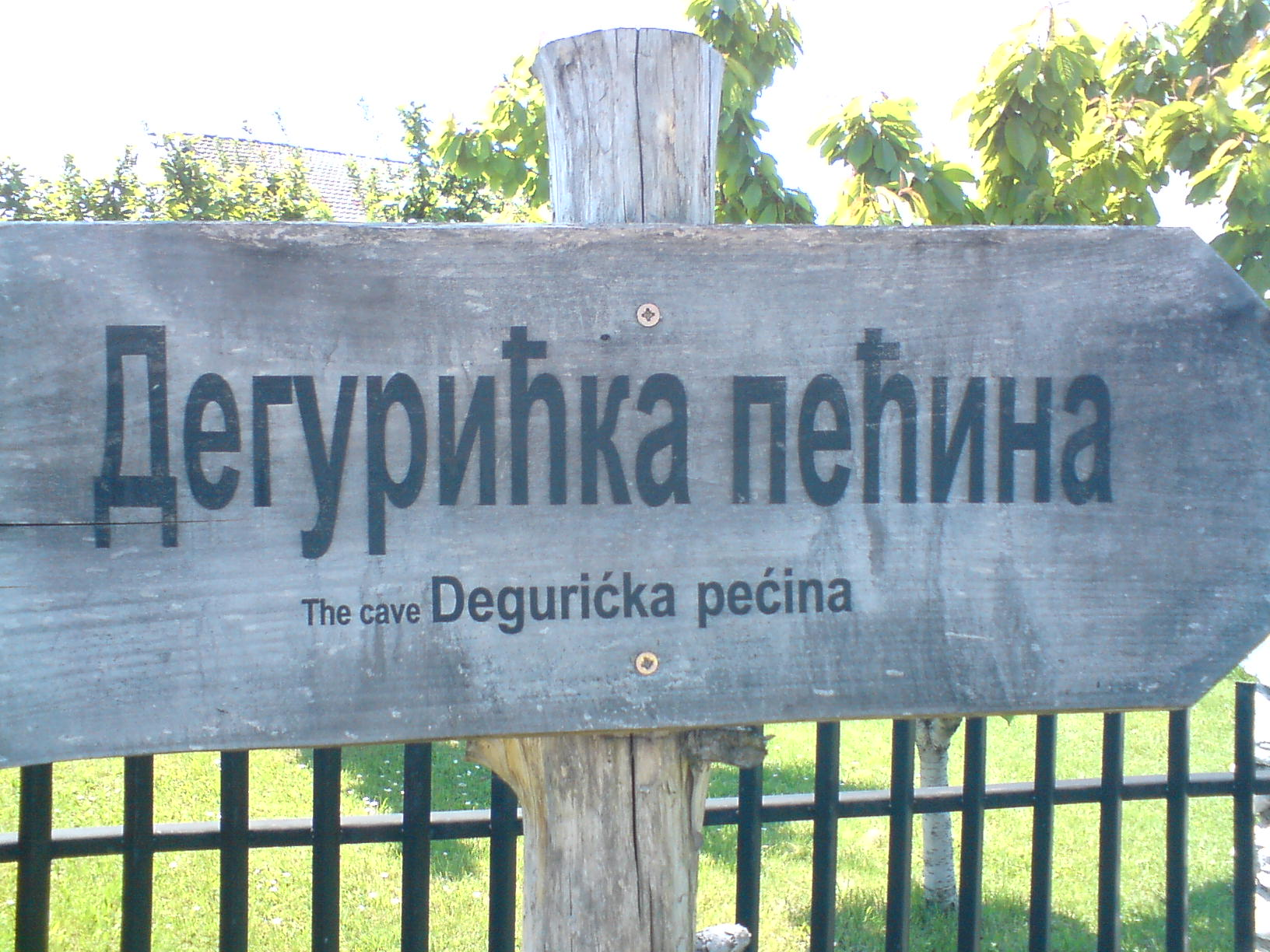
Guide to Degurić cave

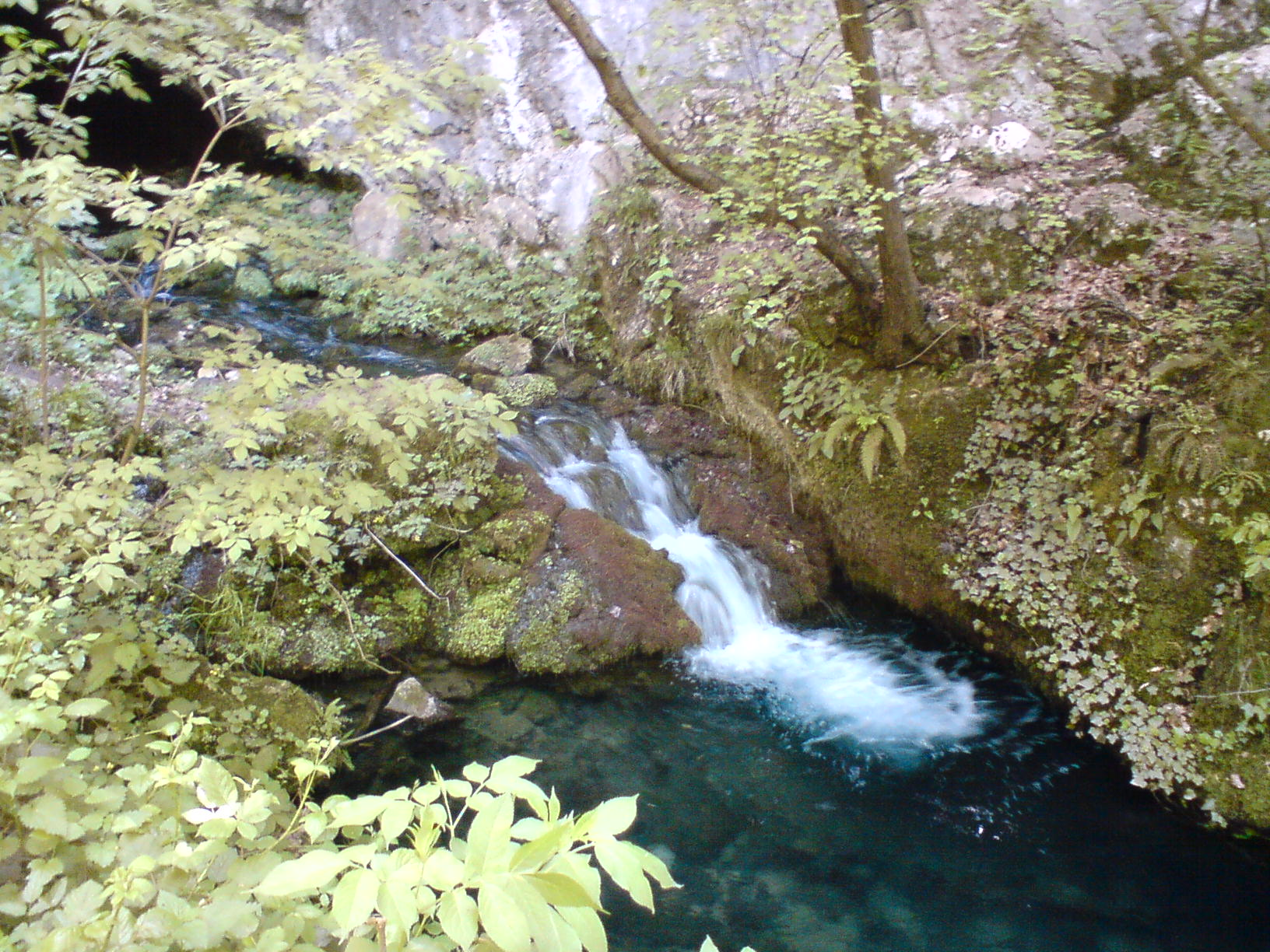
Degurić cave stream

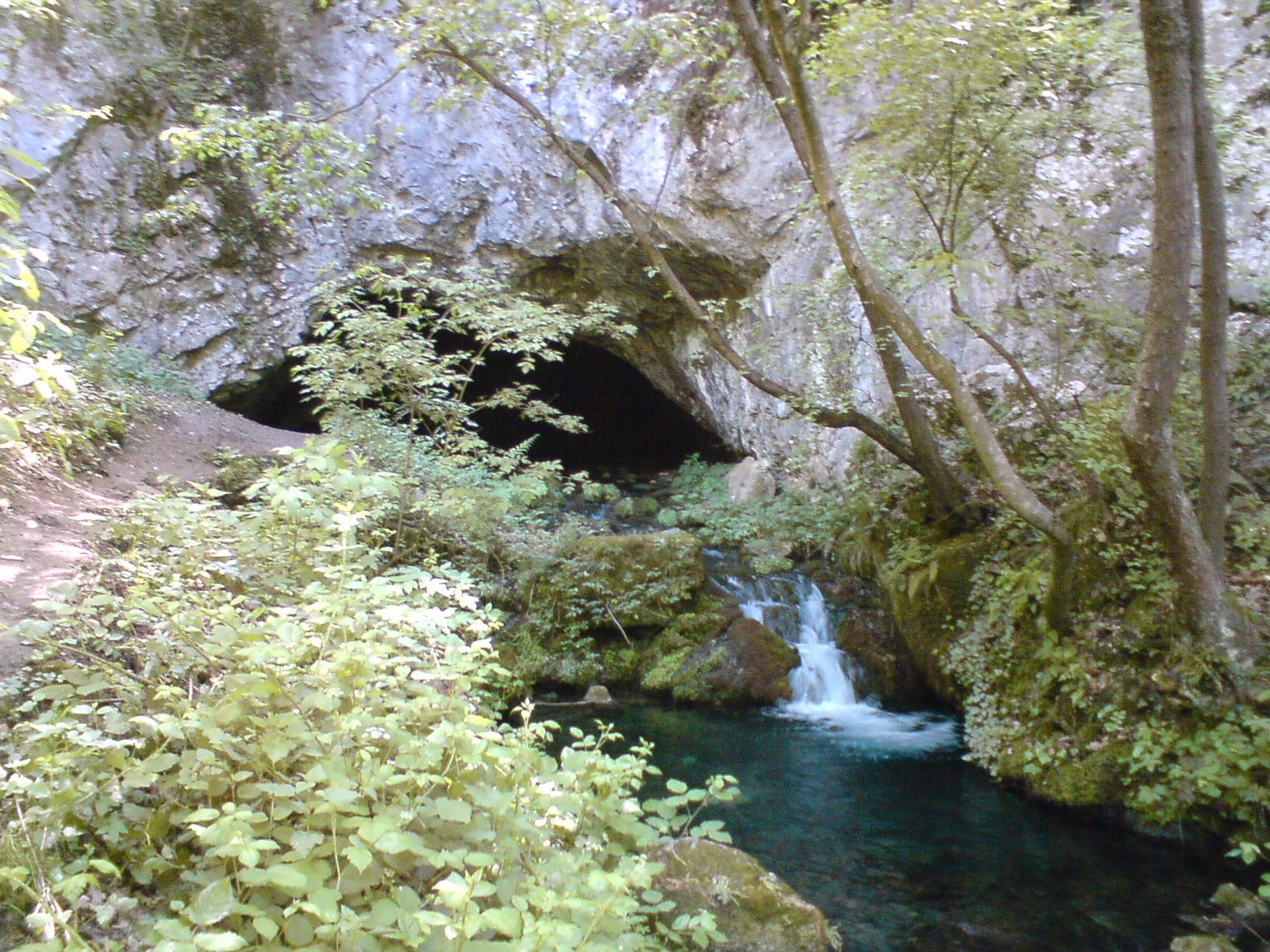
Degurić cave

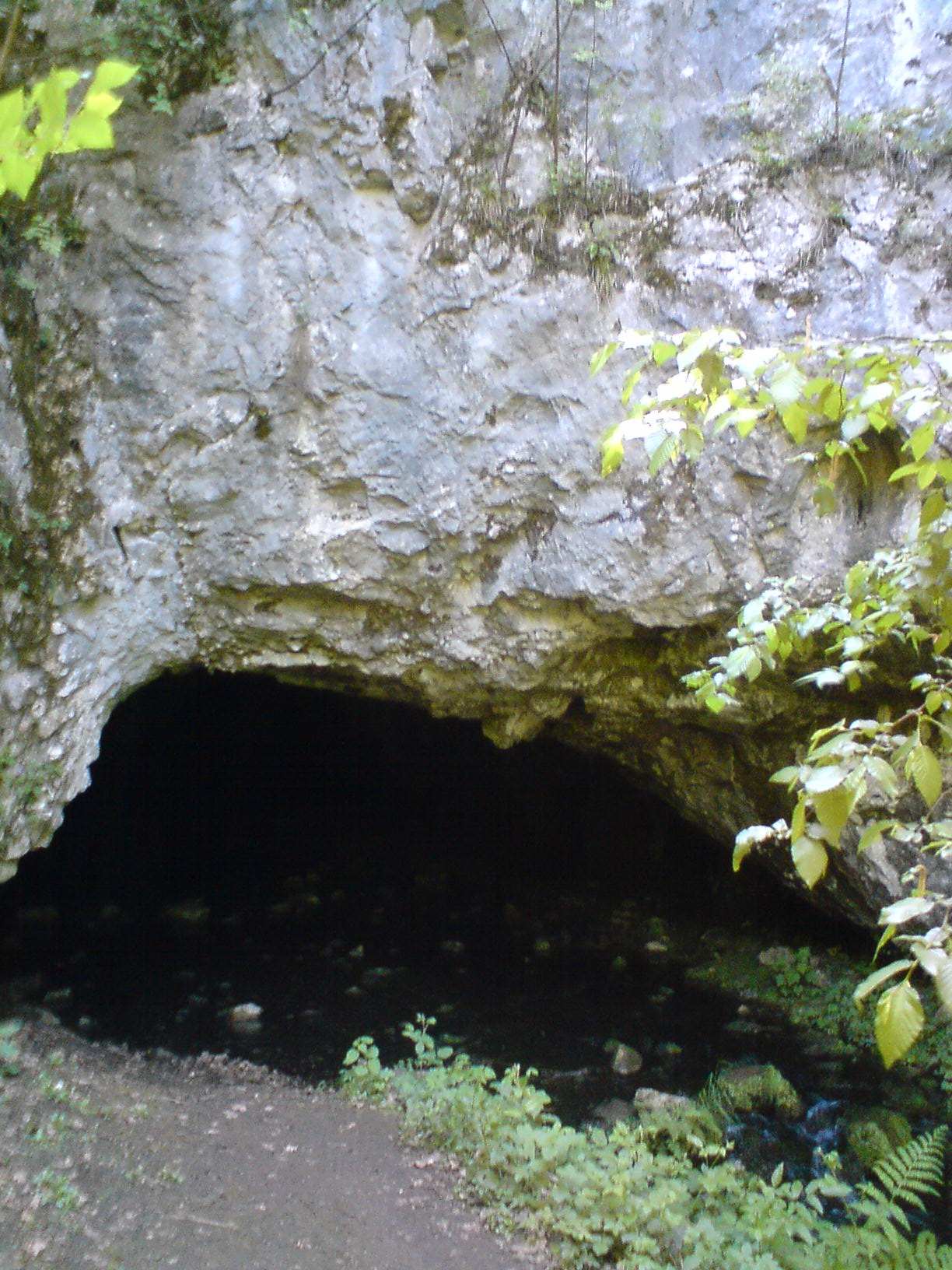
Degurić cave entrance

== See also ==
- List of caves in Serbia
