= List of karst springs in Bosnia and Herzegovina =

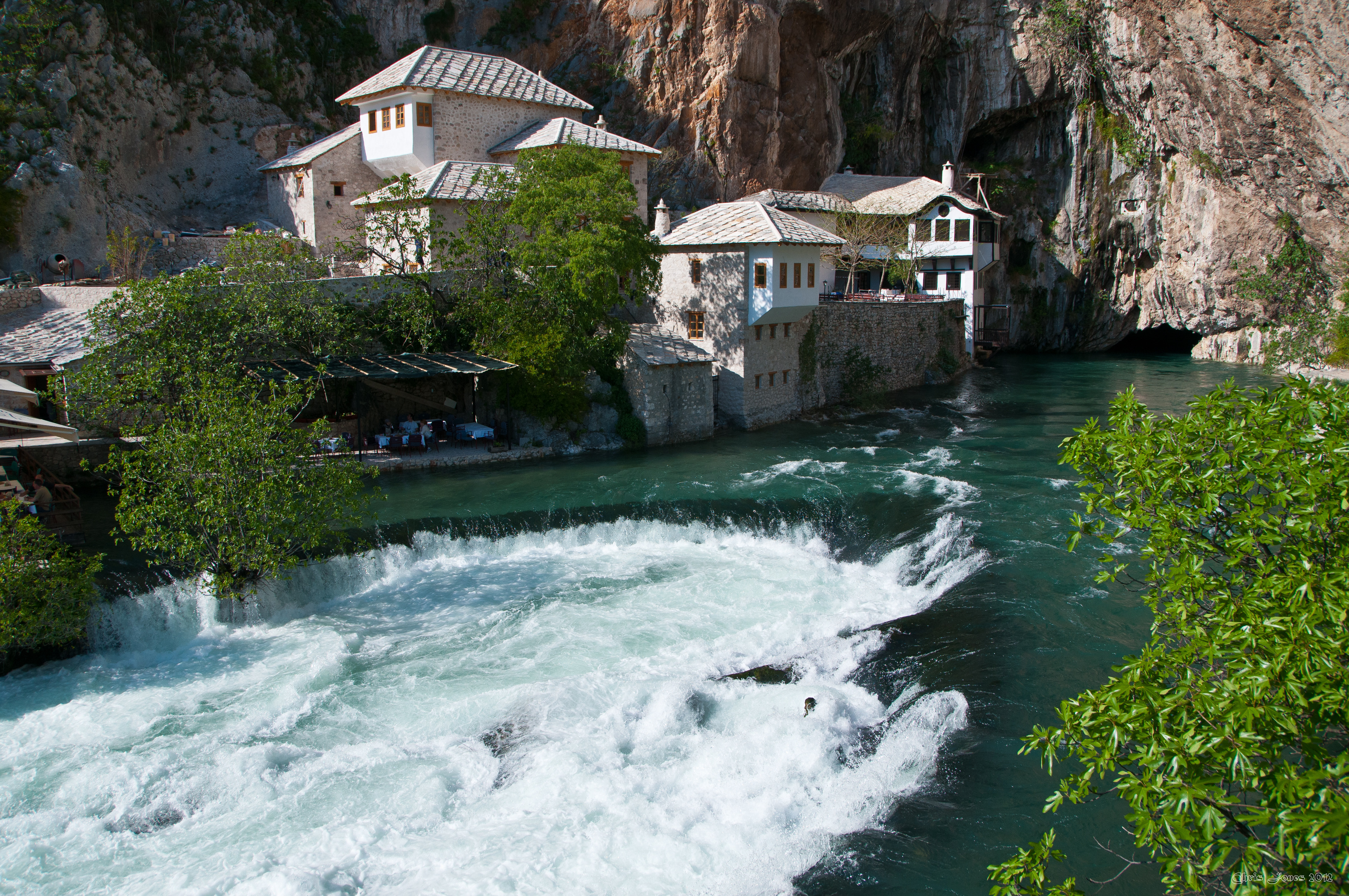
- Vrelo Bune
- Location: Bosnia and Herzegovina
- Geology: Karst caves, Dinarides
- Website: Centar za krš - CZK; devonkarst.org.uk - Fatnićko Polje - FP2 - Vrelo Trebišnjice

Location in Bosnia and Herzegovina

Following is a list of karst springs in Bosnia and Herzegovina. Most of the country's karstic wellsprings belong to Dinaric Alps systems of limestone, flysch, and/or their tectonic contact zone. These are almost regularly large founts in hydrogeological terms, with large average annual discharges, and with extremely high amplitudes between minimum and maximum discharge, depending on seasonal flow, precipitation, other various hydrological parameters and sometimes anthropological impacts. Waters often emerging from large karst caves, in many cases with complex underground flow, various characteristic karstic features and endemic biodiversity, creating short river courses with relatively large water discharge.

Image	Name	Dimension	Location	Notes
	Banja Stijena	m	loc	(a.k.a. ) Mračna pećina (transl. Dark Cave)
	Vrelo Bune	m	Blagaj, Mostar	The Buna river wellspring cave
	Dabarska 1	m	loc	The Dabar river wellspring
	Dabarska 2	m	loc	The Dabar river wellspring
	Duman	m	loc	The Bistrica's Duman wellspring cave
	Govještica cave	m	loc	(a.k.a. Dugovještica)
	Klokot spring cave			Una's tributary in Bihać
	Krupa wellsprings	m	Krupa na Vrbasu	note
	Vrelo Krušnice	m	Bosanska Krupa	Una's tributary in Bosanska Krupa
	Vrelo Miljacke	m	loc	The Mokranjska Miljacka wellspring cave
	Peć Mlini	m	Peć Mlini	The Trebižat river wellspring cave
	Vilina Pećina	m	Ključ, Cerničko Polje	note
	Vrelo Trebišnjice	m	Bileća	Dejan's Cave the main wellsprings in the Trebišnjica wellsprings group
	Kovači estavelle	m	Kovači, Duvanjsko Polje	note

== See also ==
Media related to Karst springs in Bosnia and Herzegovina at Wikimedia Commons

- List of caves in Bosnia and Herzegovina
