= List of Dinaric caves =

This is an incomplete list of caves in the Dinaric Alps.

== Banjška planota ==
Banjška planota ...

== Baška grapa ==
Baška grapa ...

== Biokovo ==
Biokovo ...

== Bjelašnica ==
Bjelašnica ...

== Bobija ==
Bobija ...

== Bočko pogorje ==
Names	Depth	Length	State	Number	Elevation	Coordinates	Sources
Balunjača	1	9		SI01067	875	46.28823°N 15.59739°E	
Belikovka	5	25		SI04659	390	46.290430°N 15.655820°E	
Belojača	23	550		SI02204	350	46.298830°N 15.654880°E	
Jama pod kamnolomom pri Studenicah	1	7		SI01731	320	46.2985°N 15.61243°E	
Jama v kamnolomu nad Studenicami	11	32		SI00252	400	46.29713°N 15.61501°E	
Kolarnica	0	6		SI04663	420	46.289080°N 15.656330°E	
Mala jama na Boču	6	11		SI01733	880	46.28822°N 15.59934°E	
Požiralnik na Formili	5	33		SI03309	620	46.286280°N 15.625920°E	
Požiralnik pri bolnišnici	4	17		SI03308	620	46.28583°N 15.62462°E	
Požiralnik v Klečah	63	212		SI03379	420	46.296430°N 15.650520°E	
Spodnja Resenca	5	5		SI04660	510	46.288350°N 15.657760°E	
Stari Grad 1	6	10		SI08709	450	46.291790°N 15.664280°E	
Stari Grad 2	5	11		SI08710	450	46.291730°N 15.664170°E	
Stari Grad 3 (Resenca)	5	24		SI08403	528	46.288050°N 15.658580°E	
Stari Grad 4 (Resenca)	3	23		SI08404	557	46.287330°N 15.660370°E	
Stari Grad 5 (Resenca)	3	11		SI08405	554	46.287320°N 15.660370°E	
Stari Grad 6	16	17		SI08923	440	46.288530°N 15.656630°E	
Stari Grad 7	4	18		SI08924	435	46.290760°N 15.656790°E	
Šoštarca	8	15		SI04662	537	46.288710°N 15.654910°E	
Zgornja Belikovka	14	25		SI04664	440	46.288670°N 15.656570°E	
Zgornja Resenca				SI04661	570	46.288600°N 15.660340°E	

== Brač ==
Brač ...

== Brkini ==
Brkini ...

== Bukovica ==
Bukovica ...

== Ceklinsko polje ==
Ceklinsko polje ...

== Cerkniško polje ==
Cerkniško polje ...

== Cesarsko brdo ==
Names	Depth	Length	State	Number	Elevation	Coordinates	Sources
Klanječka jama							
Krajcerova špilja	2	9.5		HR00218		46.05547°N 15.74846°E	
Pažetova jama (Note: Pažetovajama, Papežova jama)			Buried.			(Note: Japica)	(Note: ˙˙˙˙˙˙˙˙)

== Cetina ==
Cetina ...

== Cres and Lošinj ==
Cres-Lošinj ...

== Crnopac ==
Crnopac

== Ćićarija and Učka ==
Učka and Ćićarija ...

== Dinara ==
Dinara ...

== Dobrovlje ==
Dobrovlje ...

== Drvodevnik ==
Usually seen as part of the Žumberak Mountains alongside Radoha and Ljuben. Some of its caves are listed there, under the Krka, and under White Carniola.

== Durmitor ==
Durmitor ...

== Duvanjsko polje ==
Duvanjsko polje ...

== Elaphites ==
Elaphites ...

== Gacka ==
Gacka ...

== Glacinac ==
Glasinac ...

== Glinščica ==
Glinščica ...

== Gotenica-Reka ==
Gotenica-Reka plateau ...

== Goteniška gora ==
Goteniška gora ...

== Gradiše ==
Gradiše ...

== Greben ==
Greben ...

== Grmeč ==
Grmeč ...

== Hrušica ==
Hrušica ...

== Hvar ==
Hvar ...

== Idrijca ==
Idrijca ...

== Ilova gora ==
Ilova gora ...

== Imotsko polje ==
Imotsko polje ...

== Istria ==
Istria ...

== Kalnik ==
The speleological cadastre of Kalnik was finished in 2013 and published as Speleološki i biospeleološki katastar Kalnika i Varaždinsko – topličkog gorja. Caves are still being catalogued and explored.

Names	Depth	Length	State	Number	Elevation	Coordinates	Sources
Kleščina	0	20	(Note: "U cilju zaštite speleoloških objekata ili njihovih dijelova od Ministarstva je potrebno ishoditi dopuštenje za posjećivanje, korištenje ili uređenje speleološkog objekta ili njegovoga dijela." [In order to protect speleological objects or their parts, it is necessary to seek a permit from the Ministry for the visiting of, use of or arrangement of a speleological object or its part.])	HR00226		46.120°N 16.388°E	
Kranjča špilja	27	125		HR00209		46.13094°N 16.44039°E	
Topolkova hiža 1 (Note: Topolkova hiža I)	?	?		HR00227		46.134°N 16.505°E	
Topolkova hiža 2 (Note: Topolkova hiža II)	0	5		HR00575		46.134°N 16.505°E	
Topolkova hiža 3 (Note: Topolkova hiža III)	2	9		HR00228		46.134°N 16.505°E	
Topolkova hiža 4		5.5		HR00230		46.134°N 16.505°E	
Ljubelj jama	3.6	5.2	Caving certification required.	HR02850		46.1654°N 16.4295°E	
Ljubelj polušpilja		3				46.1604°N 16.4089°E	
Špilja pod Križnim kamenom							
Špilja pod Špicom	3	22	Caving certification required. Closed to the public.	HR00219		46.159595°N 16.410973°E	(Note: ˙˙˙˙˙˙˙˙)

== Klanjsko polje ==
Klanjsko polje ...

== Kočevski rog ==
Kočevski rog ...

== Konavle ==
Konavle ...

== Korana ==
Korana ...

== Korčula ==
Korčula ...

== Kosinjsko polje ==
Kosinjsko polje ...

== Kostelsko gorje ==
Names	Depth	Length	State	Number	Elevation	Coordinates	Sources
Hušnjakova polušpilja (Note: Hušnjakova špilja, Krapinska špilja)			Buried.			46.165358°N 15.862559°E	(Note: ˙˙˙)
Polušpilja u Pregradi (Note: Polušpilja u Pregradi, Lovačka priča)	1.7	9		HR02132		46.16552°N 15.7482°E	

== Kotorski zaljev ==
Kotorski zaljev ...

== Kozara ==
Kozara

== Kozjak and Svilaja ==
Svilaja with Kozjak ...

== Kraški visoravan ==
Kraški visoravan ...

== Krk ==
Krk

== Krka (Adriatic Sea) ==
Krka ...

== Krka (Sava) ==
Krka ...

== Krpel ==
Krpel ...

== Kupa ==
Incomplete list.

Names	Depth	Length	State	Number	Elevation	Coordinates	Sources
Izvor u Riblju		13.6	HR01436			45.4243°N 15.1576°E	
Jama kod trešnje						45.41825°N 15.17547°E	
Jama na Vršiću	4	8				45.428733°N 15.19175°E (lower entrance), 45.4455°N 15.1863°E (upper entrance)	
Jama u Klancu	26	17		Danger! Waste.		45.423056°N 15.1905°E	
Ločica (Note: Špilja u kanjonu Kupe)	10.2	222 (Note: 216)	HR02073			45.42097°N 15.17561°E	
Podseverinske jazbine						45.422472°N 15.169556°E	
Podseverinska polušpilja						45.42158°N 15.16852°E	
Podseverinska špilja	0	7				45.42208°N 15.16844°E	
Sopot Damaljski						45.421222°N 15.178472°E	
Špilja na Vršiću donja		5				45.42975°N 15.19072°E	
Špilja na Vršiću gornja						45.42856°N 15.19219°E	
Zdihovski đot						45.42636°N 15.22617°E	

== Lastovo ==
Lastovo ...

== Lička Plješivica ==
Lička Plješivica ...

== Ličko polje ==
Ličko polje ...

== Ličko sredogorje ==
Ličko sredogorje ...

== Lipnik ==
Lipnik was included in the cadastre published in the 2013 work Kvantificiranje vrijednosti i ugroženosti speleoloških objekata odabranog krškog područja Dinarida – primjer Ozaljskog pobrđa.

Names	Depth	Length	State	Number	Elevation	Coordinates	Sources
Đot	42	146		HR01768	408	45.536522°N 15.338205°E	
Jama bez imena	26	?		HR01558	398	45.520125°N 15.356629°E	
Jama na Tićkovcu (Note: Jama na Tičkovcu)	10	?		HR01508	456	45.519120°N 15.369717°E	
Jama na Glavici	15	?		HR01509	308	45.512287°N 15.353930°E	
Jama na Škrilama	54	?		HR01766	413	45.53277°N 15.34442°E	
Jama pod Gubačkim vrhom	21	?		HR03986		45.55°N 15.32°E	
Jama u Gvozdaku	16	?		HR01510	290	45.487732°N 15.386589°E	
Jama uz blatni put	29	?		HR01556	392	45.535080°N 15.345047°E	
Jama 13	10.5	?		HR01555	420	45.536304°N 15.341917°E	
Kopar	13	?		HR01557	302	45.51684°N 15.34678°E	
Prozornica	34	?	Danger! Waste.	HR01504	355	45.529576°N 15.364409°E	
Špilja u Debeloj glavi	6	?	Danger! Waste.	HR02190		45.55998°N 15.32380°E	
Tvorcova jama	34	64	Danger! Waste.	HR01505	338	45.526454°N 15.369701°E	
Uska jama	28	?		HR01507	402	45.534135°N 15.345169°E	
Vatrena jama (Note: Mali đot)	45.5	?		HR01767	402	45.535039°N 15.343638°E	
Zdenčajka I (Note: Zdenčajka 1)	23.5	?		HR01551	344	45.559610°N 15.326752°E	
Zdenčajka II (Note: Zdenčajka 2)	30	?		HR01769	349	45.559384°N 15.326815°E	
Zdenčajka III (Note: Zdenčajka 3)	15.5	?		HR01552	398	45.554882°N 15.327903°E	
Zdenčajka IV (Note: Zdenčajka 4)	9	?		HR01553	401	45.555556°N 15.328189°E	
Zdenčajka V (Note: Zdenčajka 5)	17	?		HR01559	390	45.557400°N 15.328340°E	
Zvonečka I (Note: Zvonećka 1)	41	?	Danger! Waste.	HR01771	330	45.532011°N 15.370890°E	
Zvonečka II (Note: Zvonečka 2)	61	81		HR01770	365	45.531196°N 15.366890°E	

== Livanjsko polje ==
Livanjsko polje ...

== Logateško polje ==
Logateško polje ...

== Loško pogorje ==
Loško pogorje ...

== Lovćen ==
Lovćen ...

== Macelj and Ravna gora ==
A speleological cadastre of Ravna gora was published in 2009 titled Završni izvještaj projekta Izrada speleološkog i biospeleološkog katastra Ravne gore with additions in 2011 and since then updates have only been made to local and national cadastres. Earlier catalogues were published in 1961 and 1980. More recently, exploration has expanded to the Macelj massif, of which Ravna gora is sometimes considered a part.

== Maganik ==
Maganik ...

== Mala Kapela ==
Mala Kapela ...

== Matarsko podolje ==
Matarsko podolje ...

== Menišija ==
Menišija ...

== Mljet ==
Mljet ...

== Moračka kapa ==
Moračka kapa ...

== Mosor ==
Mosor ...

== Nanos ==
Nanos ...

== Narinsko polje ==
Narinsko polje ...

== Neprobićka gora ==
Neprobićka gora ...

== Neretva ==
Neretva:

== Njeguško polje ==
Njeguško polje ...

== Očura ==
Many of the caves of Ivanščica and Strahinjčica were listed by Vladimir Redenšek in 1961. Work on the speleological cadastre of Ivanščica began in 2008, an early version being presented in 2009. The last full version was finished in 2011 titled Speleološki i biospeleološki katastar Ivanščice, and since then updates have only been made to local and national cadastres.

== Ombla ==
Ombla:

== Orjen ==
Orjen:

== Osapska dolina ==
Osapska dolina:

== Ozaljsko pobrđe ==
A speleological cadastre for Ozaljsko pobrđe was published in the 2013 work Kvantificiranje vrijednosti i ugroženosti speleoloških objekata odabranog krškog područja Dinarida – primjer Ozaljskog pobrđa.

Names	Depth	Length	State	Number	Elevation	Coordinates	Sources
Bazgovica	32				415	45.599148°N 15.409981°E	(Note: ˙˙˙˙˙˙˙)
Jama pod Jelen vrhom	12.5	?		HR02482	400	45.593577°N 15.397700°E	(Note: ˙˙)
Orik					345	45.579911°N 15.419643°E	
Pivnica (Note: Pimnica)	51	180	Closed to the public.	HR01440	245	45.601559°N 15.356813°E	(Note: ˙˙˙˙˙˙)
Polušpilja penjališta u Kamanju						45.633°N 15.415°E	
Slakova špilja	0	25		HR01554	158	45.546785°N 15.371500°E	(Note: ˙)
Sveti Križ	58	?			338	45.527740°N 15.438457°E	
Šabac	19	?		HR03886	285	45.522789°N 15.438866°E	(Note: ˙)
Šćokovica (Note: Ščokovica)	4.5	6.5		HR02759	360	45.589798°N 15.381909°E	(Note: ˙˙)
Špilja iznad penjališta u Kamanju	0	6		HR00641		45.633°N 15.415°E	(Note: ˙)

== Pag ==
Pag:

== Pelješac ==
Pelješac:

== Peštersko polje ==
Peštersko polje ...

== Pišteničko gorje ==
Pišteničko gorje ...

== Pivska planina ==
Pivska planina ...

== Planinsko polje ==
Planinsko polje ...

== Polhograjsko hribovje ==
Polhograjsko hribovje ...

== Polomsko podolje ==
Polomsko podolje ...

== Popovo Polje ==
Popovo Polje (incomplete list):

Names	Depth	Length	State	Number	Elevation	Coordinates	Sources
Vjetrenica Cave		7,014 m (23,012 ft)				42°50′45″N 17°59′02″E	

== Povlen ==
Povlen ...

== Prača ==
Prača Canyon (incomplete list):

Names	Depth	Length	State	Number	Elevation	Coordinates	Sources
Mračna Pećina (also known as Banj, Ban or Banja Stijena) (Note: Mračna Pećina also known as Banj, Ban or Banja Stijena)		2,000 meters				43.77525°N 18.889722°E	
Govještica cave (a.k.a. Dugovještica cave) (Note: Govještica Cave a.k.a. Dugovještica Cave)		9.6 kilometers				43.774134°N 18.888668°E	

== Prenj ==
Prenj ...

== Prokletije ==
Prokletije ...

== Promina ==
Promina ...

== Prvić (Krk) ==
Prvić ...

Names	Depth	Length	State	Number	Elevation	Coordinates	Sources
Šupovica					291	44.90392°N 14.80025°E	

== Pusto polje ==
Pusto polje ...

== Rab ==
Rab ...

== Rakov Škocjan ==
Rakov Škocjan ...

== Ravni Kotari ==
Ravni Kotari ...

== Ravnik ==
Ravnik ...

== Ravno lič-poljsko ==
Ravno lič-poljsko ...

== Ribniška dolina ==
Ribniška dolina ...

== Risan ==
Risan ...

== Ropojana ==
Ropojana ...

== Skadar ==
Skadar valley ...

== Slivnica ==
Slivnica ...

== Snežnik ==
Snežnik, Javorniki and Grobničko gorje ...

== Šator-Golija range ==
Šator-Golija ...

== Tara ==
Tara ...

== Trnovo polje ==
Trnovo polje ...

== Trnovski gozd ==
Trnovski gozd ...

== Ulovka ==
Ulovka ...

== Una ==
Una ...

== Varaždinske Toplice Mountains ==
The speleological cadastre of Varaždinsko Topličko gorje was finished in 2013 and published as Speleološki i biospeleološki katastar Kalnika i Varaždinsko – topličkog gorja.

Names	Depth	Length	State	Number	Elevation	Coordinates	Sources
Rabuzinova jama (Note: Jama u Rabuzinovoj šumi, Jama u Robuzinovoj šumi, Jama na brdu iznad izletišta Lužec)	20	37		HR00214		46.20822°N 16.37647°E	(Note: ˙˙˙)
Toplička špilja	1.5	10		HR00217		46.2110°N 16.4136°E	(Note: ˙˙)
Toplička Polušpilja s Vodopadom	0	10		HR00217		46.2110°N 16.4136°E	

== Velebit ==
Lists of caves on North, Central and South Velebit.

== Velež ==
Velež ...

== Vipavska dolina ==
Vipavska dolina ...

== Vis ==
Vis ...

== Vranice ==
Vranice ...

== White Carniola ==
White Carniola ...

== Zadar archipelago ==
Zadar archipelago ...

== Zagreb Mountains ==
The last detailed catalogue was published in 1975 by Srećko Božičević, titled Podzemni krški fenomeni planine Medvednice kraj Zagreba, but it is now outdated. Since then updates have only been made to local and national cadastres. Before 1975, lists of caves on Zagrebačka gora had been published in 1905, 1934, and 1945.

== Zasavska gora ==
Zasavska gora ...

== Zrmanja ==
Zrmanja ...

== Žijovo ==
Žijovo ...

== Žumberak Mountains ==
Includes Radoha and Ljuben. Some of its caves are listed under Drvodevnik, usually considered part of the Žumberak Mountains, as well as under Krka and White Carniola. Part of the first version of the speleological cadastre of the Nature Park "Žumberak Mountains" was published in 2002, and instructions for the digital version were published in 2006. A continuously updated cadastre of the Slovene side is maintained by the Jamarski klub Novo mesto, with more information available in the national eKataster cave database.

== See also ==
- List of caves
- List of caves in Bosnia and Herzegovina
- List of caves in Croatia
- List of caves in Italy
- List of caves in Serbia
- List of caves in Slovenia
- List of deepest Dinaric caves
- List of longest Dinaric caves

== Notes ==
=== Legend ===
Dry cave (Note: Rarely flooded.)	Partly wet cave (Note: At least one entrance dry but at least one passage with flowing water.)	Wet cave (Note: At least one entrance rarely dry.)	Submerged cave (Note: Rarely exposed.)	Cave with complex hydrological regime (Note: For example with seasonal variation.)
