= List of caves in Bosnia and Herzegovina =

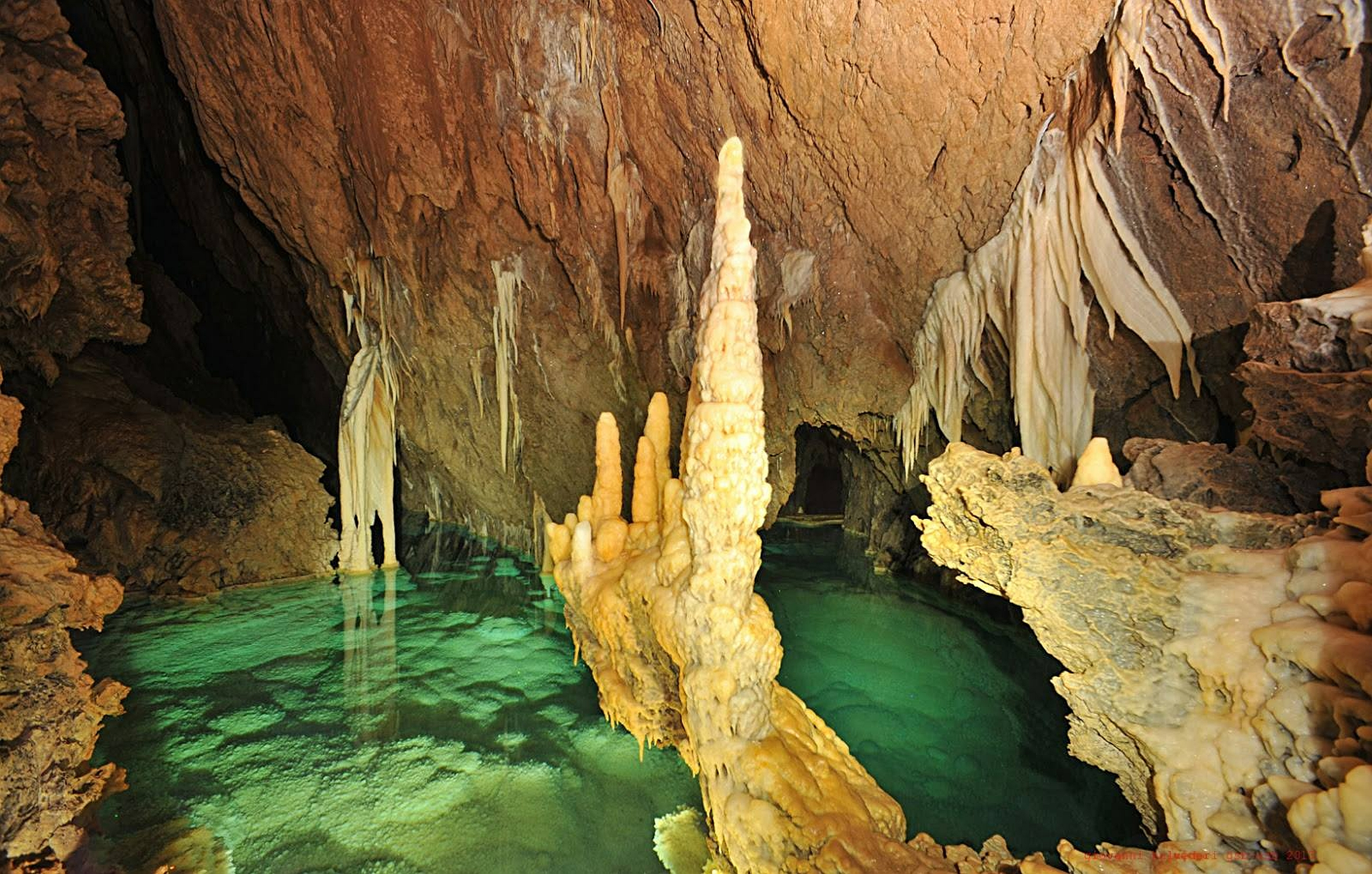
- Govještica a.k.a. Dugovještica
- Location: Bosnia and Herzegovina
- Geology: Karst caves, Dinarides
- Website: www.centarzakrs.ba

Location in Bosnia and Herzegovina

Following is a list of caves in Bosnia and Herzegovina. Most of the country's caves belong to Dinaric Alps system and are karst caves, with complex karstic features and endemic biodiversity.

Image	Name	Dimension	Location	Notes
	Badanj		loc	Upper Paleolithic site
	Banja Stijena	m	loc	(a.k.a. ) Mračna Cave
	Dimšina Cave	m	loc	Bijambare cave complex, Bijambare Nature park
	Middle Cave	m	loc	Bijambare cave complex, Bijambare Nature park
	Đurićina Cave	m	loc	Bijambare cave complex, Bijambare Nature park
	Duman Cave	m	loc	The Bistrica's Duman wellspring cave
	Dabarska 1	m	loc	The Dabar wellspring
	Dabarska 2	m	loc	The Dabar wellspring
	Djevojačka	m	loc	note
	Dejanova Pećina	m	Bileća	Dejan's Cave the Trebišnjica main wellspring
	Dobreljska	m	loc	
	Fajtovačka	m	loc	note
	Govještica Cave	m	loc	(a.k.a. Dugovještica Cave)
	Hrustovačka	m	loc	note
	Hukavica Cave	m	loc	note
	Klokočevica Cave	m	Bjelašnica	note
	Ledenica	m	loc	note
	Ledenjača Cave	m	loc	note
	Megara	m	loc	note
	Vrelo Miljacke	m	loc	The Mokranjska Miljacka wellspring cave
	Novakova	m	Pale	
	Orlovača	m	loc	note
	Pavlova	m	loc	Nature park
	Podlipe	m	loc	note
	Peć Mlini Cave	m	Peć Mlini	The Trebižat river wellspring cave
	Rastuša	m	loc	note
	Ravlića	m	loc	note
	Titova (Drvar)	m	Drvar	note
	Titova (Plahovići)	m	Plahovići	note
	Vaganska	m	loc	note
	Vilina Pećina	m	Ključ, Cerničko Polje	note
	Vjetrenica Cave	m	Ravno	note
	Vrelo Bune Cave	m	Blagaj, Mostar	The Buna river wellspring cave
	Vrelo Krušnice Cave	m	Bosanska Krupa	note
	Kovači estavelle	m	Kovači, Duvanjsko Polje	note
	Zelena Cave	m	loc	note

== See also ==
- List of caves
- List of deepest Dinaric caves
- List of Dinaric caves
- List of karst springs in Bosnia and Herzegovina
- List of longest Dinaric caves
