= Badanj =

Badanj may refer to:

- Badanj, Croatia, a village near Drniš
- Badanj, Serbia, a village near Raška
- Badanj Cave, an archeological site near Stolac, Bosnia and Herzegovina
- Badanj fortress, near Crikvenica, Croatia
