= Vilina Pećina =

Cave and a karst resurgence wellspring in Dinaric Alps karst of Bosnia and Herzegovina

- Fairy Cave
- Location within Bosnia and Herzegovina Location within Yugoslavia
- Location: Ključ, Bosnia and Herzegovina
- Coordinates: 43.094358°N 18.484379°E
- Elevation: 850 metres (2,790 ft) a.s.l.
- Discovery: First description from 1896 research
- Geology: Limestone & Flysch contact zone; Karst cave, Karst spring
- Show cave opened: No
- Translation: Fairy Cave (Serbo-Croatian)
- Pronunciation: pronounced [Will-ina pech-ina]
- Cave survey: Austria-Hungary cca. 1896; Centar za krš, Sarajevo, The Devon Karst Research Society 27 August 2005, 02 September 2006, 12 August 2006;
- Website: Vilina Pećina, Cerničko Polje - The Devon Karst Research Society

Vilina Pećina (transl. Fairy Cave) is a cave and a karst resurgence wellspring in Dinaric Alps karst of Bosnia and Herzegovina, also previously known from research descriptions of older date as "Vilić Pećina", such as one from 1896, conducted by Austria-Hungary geologists.

Geographically, it is located on the northern border of Cerničko Polje, at an elevation of 850 metres (2,790 ft) asl, just below and less than 100 meters to the west of Ključ village, Gacko municipality, Eastern Herzegovina region of Bosnia and Herzegovina. Geologically, object is located on the edge of Cerničko polje (karstic field) floor, at the thrust fault zone (overthrust), where eocene flysch and limestone make tectonic contact. In hydrogeological terms wellspring belongs to intermittent B-type (allogenic) resurgence karst spring. The wellspring cave entrance is very large with characteristic vertically elongated shape.

Vilina Pećina spring is one of the two sources of the short sinking river Ključka Rijeka. There are also many other karst springs along the entire length of Cerničko Polje, mostly situated on its edges.

== See also ==
- List of caves in Bosnia and Herzegovina
- List of karst springs in Bosnia and Herzegovina
