= Bijambare Nature Park =

Protected area in Bosnia and Herzegovina

- IUCN category V (protected landscape/seascape)
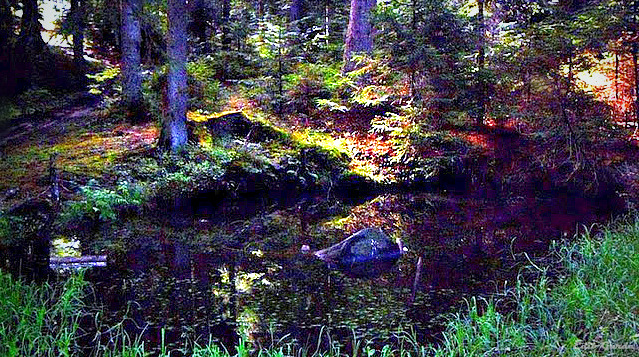
- Bijambare forest

- Location within Bosnia and Herzegovina
- Location: Bosnia and Herzegovina
- Nearest town: Olovo, near village Krivajevići (Ilijaš)
- Coordinates: 44°5′21″N 18°30′17″E
- Area: 4.97 km^{2} (1.92 sq mi)
- Elevation: 950 m (3,120 ft)
- Established: 2003

The Bijambare (Serbian Cyrillic: Бијамбаре) area, well-known for its cave complex, is located on the far north-eastern slopes of Ilijaš municipality, near Olovo a small town near Sarajevo, capital of Bosnia and Herzegovina. The protected landscape area is within boundaries of the Nišići plateau. It is accessible by the main road Sarajevo-Olovo, from which an asphalt road branches out leading towards a mountain home and the especially known Bijambare cave. Large parts of these caves are open to visitors.

== Protected landscape ==
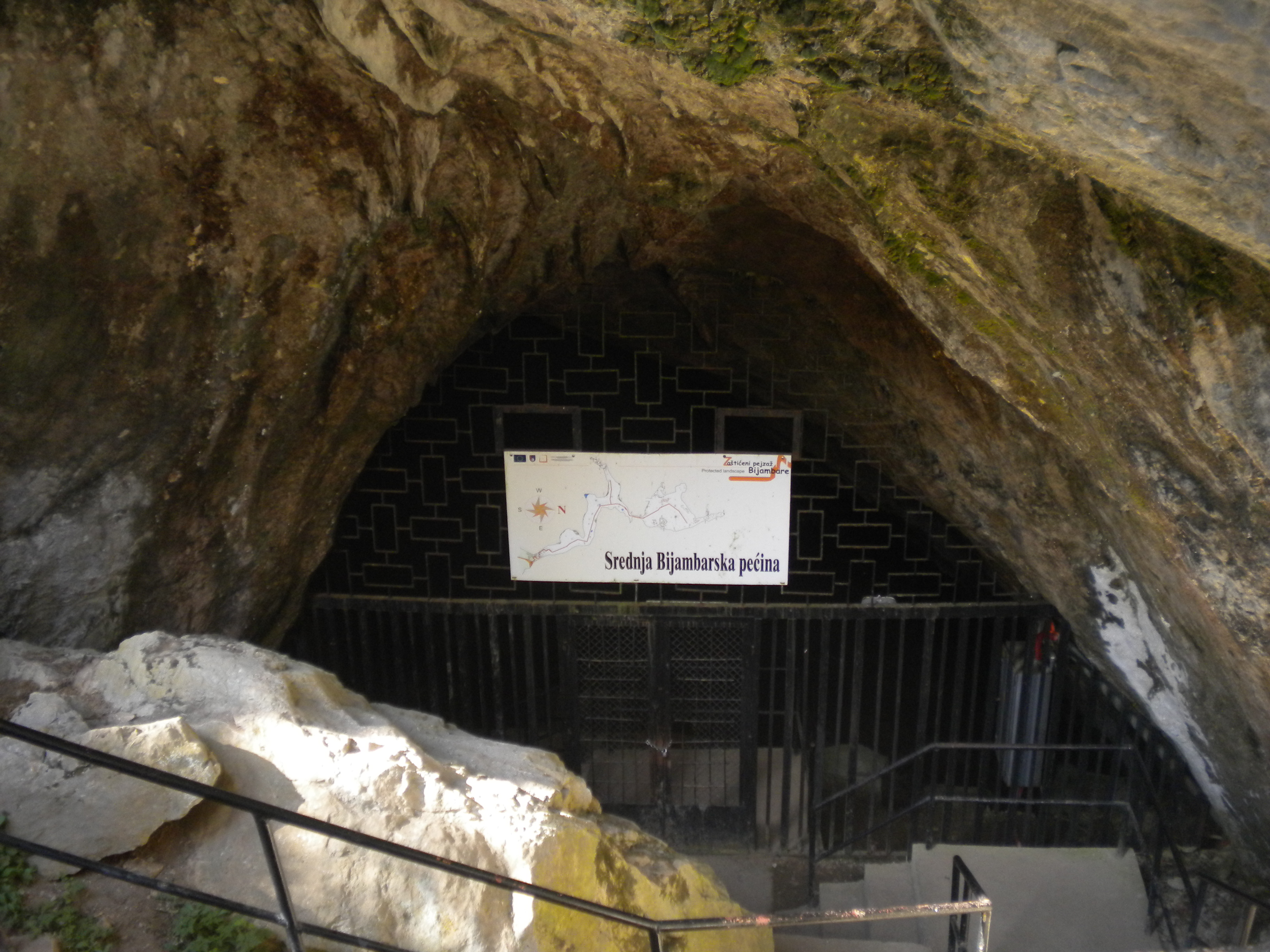
Middle (The Main) Bijambare Cave entrance.

The middle part of Bijambare is a karst plateau with all its commonly observed characteristics: caves, lost rivers, intriguing funnel-shaped depressions, rocky massifs and Bijambarsko Lake. There are numerous karst caves in the protected area, explored so far are the Middle (The Main) Bijambare Cave, Ledenjača, Lower Bijambare Cave, Ðuričina Cave, Upper Bijambare Cave, Dimšina Cave, Ledenica and New Cave. The largest and most famous of the caves is the Bijambare Cave, which is open to visitors. It is 420 meters long and is criss-crossed by four corridors that are up to thirty meters high and sixty meters wide. The largest corridor is also called the “concert hall” due to its size around 60 m in diameter and 15–30 m in height. The cave has numerous stalactites, stalagmites and curtains as well as tuff stones. It is also called the "music hall" for its acoustic effects.

== Biodiversity ==
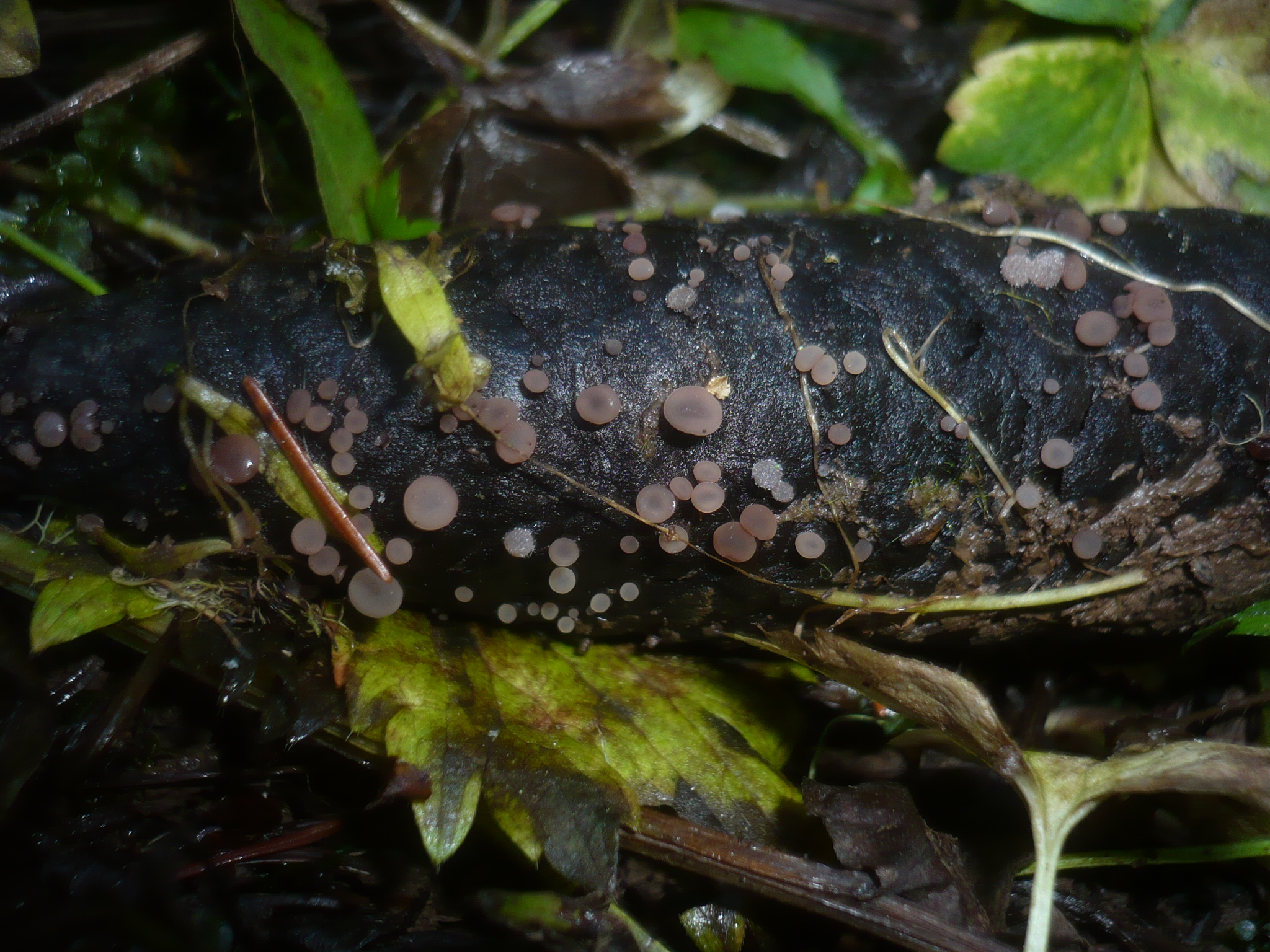
Fruit bodies of the fungus Ombrophila ianthina.

It is home to numerous species of mushrooms and medicinal plants.

== Tourist attraction ==
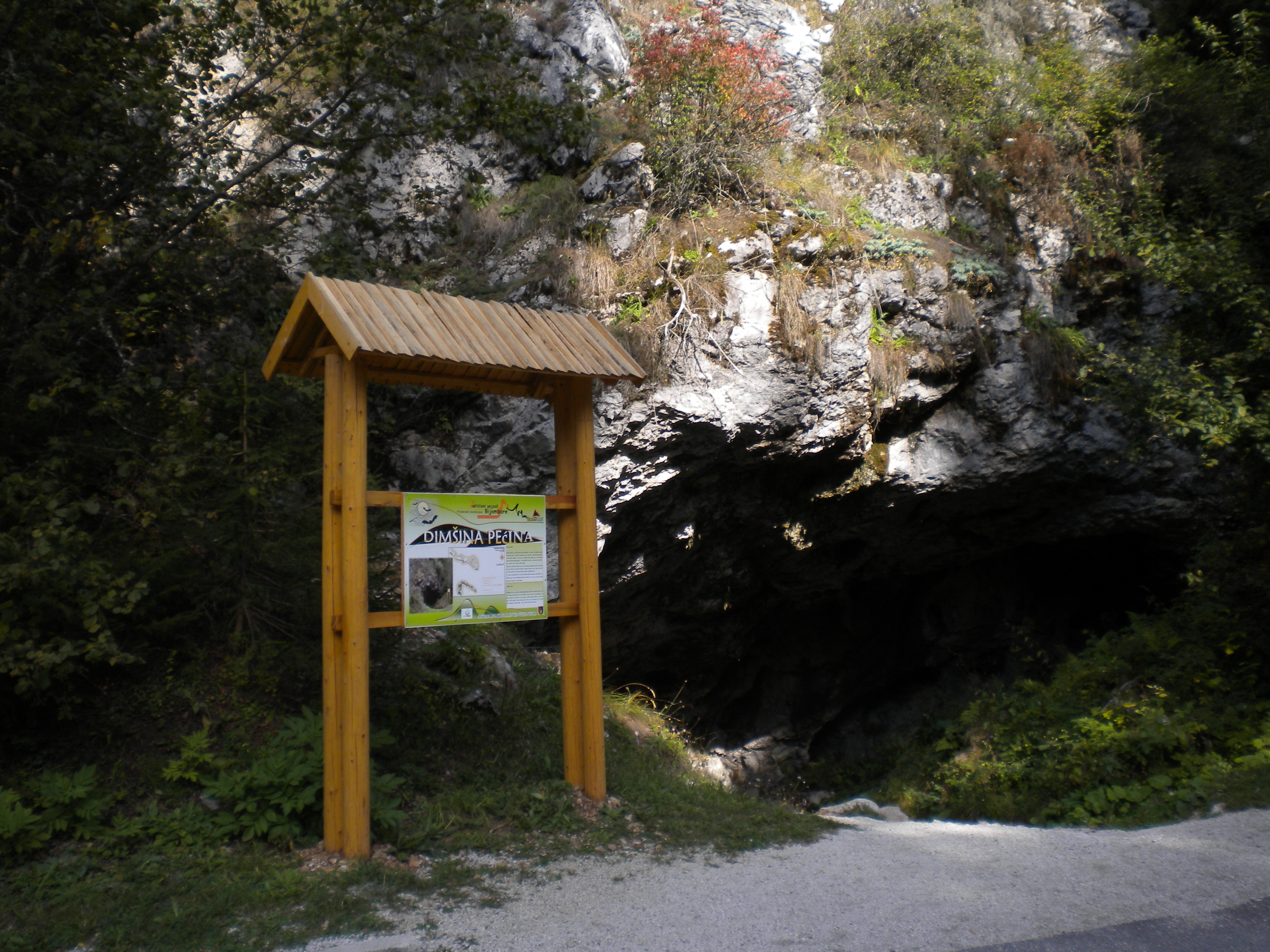
Dimšina Cave entrance.

The Bijambare cave has been a popular tourist spot and a speleological site for a long time. Area optimum height above sea level (950 m on average), thick conifer woods, meadows, two water flows with lakes and chasms, five caves, rocky massif and high quality air provide ideal conditions for alpinism, speleology, skiing, mushroom picking, medicinal herb picking, or simply for nature excursions and visits.

== See also ==
- List of caves in Bosnia and Herzegovina
- List of protected areas of Bosnia and Herzegovina
