= Nišići =

Nišići Нишићи
- Village
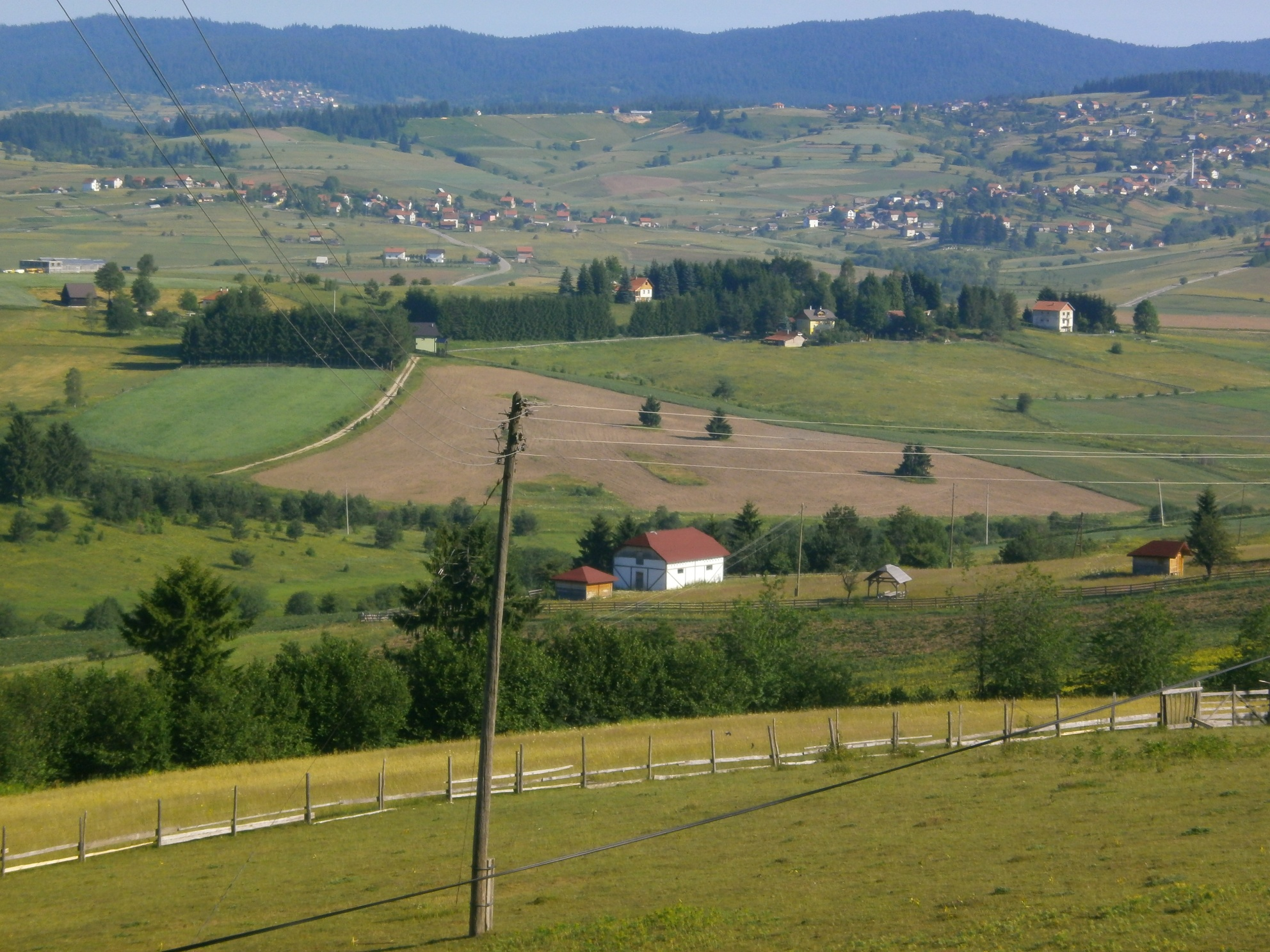

- Location within Bosnia and Herzegovina
- Coordinates: 44°04′03″N 18°28′44″E
- Country: Bosnia and Herzegovina
- Entity: Federation of Bosnia and Herzegovina
- Canton: Sarajevo
- Municipality: Ilijaš

Area
  - Total: 1.59 sq mi (4.11 km^{2})

Population (2013)
  - Total: 48
  - Density: 30/sq mi (12/km^{2})
- Time zone: UTC+1 (CET)
  - Summer (DST): UTC+2 (CEST)

Nišići (Serbian: Нишићи) is a village in the municipality of Ilijaš, situated north from Sarajevo, Bosnia and Herzegovina, on a highland karst plateau with a same name.

== Nature park Bijambare ==
The region of Nišići within areal of Bijambare is a karst enclave with all its commonly observed characteristics and features: caves, lost rivers, intriguing funnel-shaped depressions and rocky massifs. The five caves are located in three horizons, and a 50 meters high waterfall nearby. Well known for its karstic features, part of the Nišići plateau around Bijambare is designated nature park, Bijambare Nature Park, and is important tourist and speleological destination.

== Demographics ==
According to the 2013 census, its population was 48.

Ethnicity in 2013
Ethnicity	Number	Percentage
Serbs	27	56.3%
Bosniaks	18	37.5%
other/undeclared	3	6.3%
Total	48	100%
