= Dabar Cave =

Cave in Sanski Most, Bosnia and Herzegovina

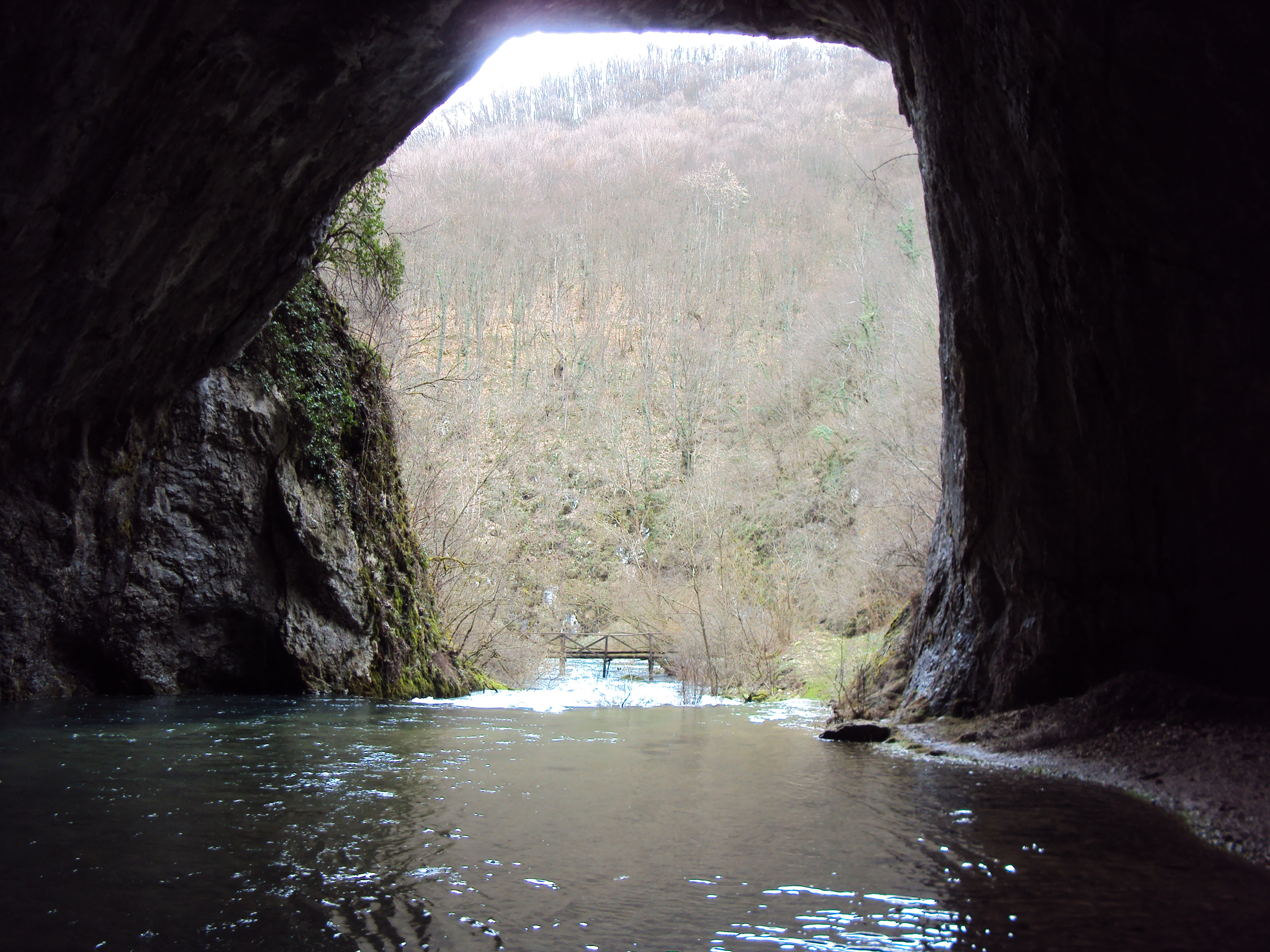
- Dabarska pećina

- Location within Bosnia and Herzegovina
- Location: Donji Dabar, Bosnia and Herzegovina
- Coordinates: 44.709825°N 16.638709°E
- Geology: Karst
- Entrances: 1
- Features: Well-spring cave

Dabar Cave (Bosnian: Dabarska pećina, lit. 'Beaver Cave') is located in the municipality of Sanski Most, Bosnia and Herzegovina. It is one of two sources of the river Dabar in the village of Donji Dabar.

The cave is unexplored. Its exact length and depth are unknown. At the entrance to the cave, a massive interior space opens. Deeper into the cave is a lake, which is very abundant during rainy and snowy periods. During heavy rainfall, a very large lake is created that prevents anyone from going deeper into the cave. The Dabar cave does not abound in cave decorations, stalactites and stalagmites.

In scientific research several decades ago, a "human fish" was found in a lake located in the interior of a cave, an endemic species from prehistory that survived only in extremely clear waters and dark spaces. Archaeological research has revealed that the cave was inhabited in prehistoric times, since the objects which were used in daily lives by local inhabitants were discovered. Remains of the wooden settlement ("sojenica") were also found nearby and are believed to date from the Illyrian period.

== See also ==
- List of caves in Bosnia and Herzegovina
