= Prača (river) =

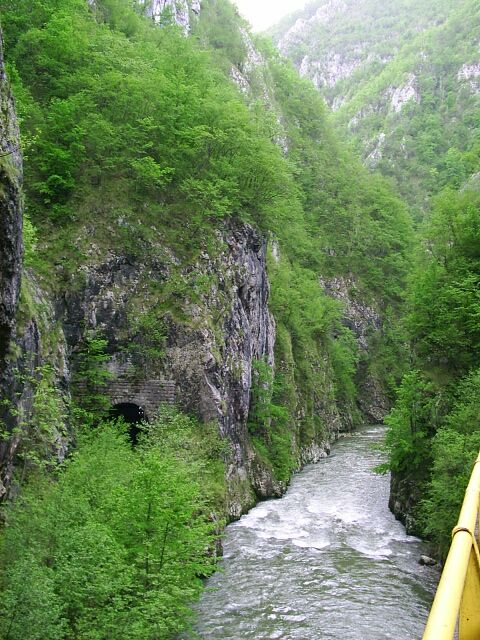

- Location within Bosnia and Herzegovina

Location
- Country: Bosnia and Herzegovina

Physical characteristics
- Mouth
  - location: Drina
  - coordinates: 43°41′29″N 19°05′05″E
- Length: 55 km^{2} (21 sq mi)
- Basin size: 1,019 km^{2} (393 sq mi)

Basin features
- Progression: Drina→ Sava→ Danube→ Black Sea

The Prača (Serbian Cyrillic: Прача) is a left tributary of the Drina in eastern Bosnia and Herzegovina. It source is in Pale, Bosnia and Herzegovina at an altitude of 1540 m. After 55 km it flows into the Drina in Ustiprača. The Prača Canyon is declared a nature monument and a protected landscape, including caves of Mračna Pećina (also known as Banj or Banja Stijena) and Govještica (also known as Dugovještica) as Special geo-morphological reserves of Bosnia and Herzegovina.

The Prača offers terrains for recreational fishing on salmonids and numerous other fish species, but is primarily an important spawning ground for huchen and nase, both of which enter the river from the Drina.

== See also ==
- List of rivers of Bosnia and Herzegovina
