= Badanj Cave =

Cave and archaeological site in Herzegovina

- Badanj Pećina
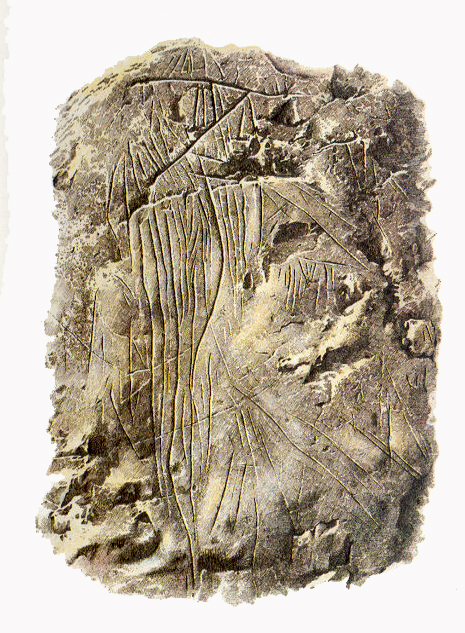
- Cave carvings in Badanj Cave

- Location within Bosnia and Herzegovina
- Interactive map of Badanj Cave
- Location: Borojevići near Stolac
- Coordinates: 43.0805°N 17.8854°E
- Show cave opened: yes
- Features: Rock art
- Website: centarzakrs.ba

Badanj Cave (Serbo-Croatian: Pećina Badanj) is located south of the village of Borojevići, west of the town of Stolac, Bosnia and Herzegovina. It began to attract public attention after the 1976 discovery of its cave engravings, which date to between 14,000 and 18,000 years ago.

Thanks to local natural benefits and preferable composition, topography, climate, hydrography and vegetation and rich hunting grounds have long attracted prehistoric settlers: the region has been settled since antiquity.

The site is rock shelter or overhang recessed beneath a cliff that descends to the right bank of the river Bregava.

Two chronologically distinct strata of Palaeolithic occupation were identified beneath the surface layer. Of particular significance was the discovery of a particular carving of the Badanj site, as it ranks among the oldest works of art in Bosnia and Herzegovina. The carving is cut into the diagonal surface of a large polished block of stone, and probably represents a horse seen from the offside flank that has been hit by arrows. Only the rear half of the body survives, with flanks typical for a horse and part of the body; the rest of the drawing has been partly damaged.

The Badanj carvings include depictions of animals and symbols, as is typical of Mediterranean prehistoric art. The site was dated to the late Upper Palaeolithic. The cave is part of The Natural and Architectural Ensemble of Stolac, submitted by the Stolac municipality, and the Herzegovina-Neretva county to be recognized a UNESCO heritage site in 2007 and inducted into UNESCO's tentative list. It has also been designated as a National Monument of Bosnia and Herzegovina since 2003.

== See also ==
- List of caves in Bosnia and Herzegovina
