= Govještica cave =

Cave located in the canyon of the Prača River

Govještica
- Dugovještica
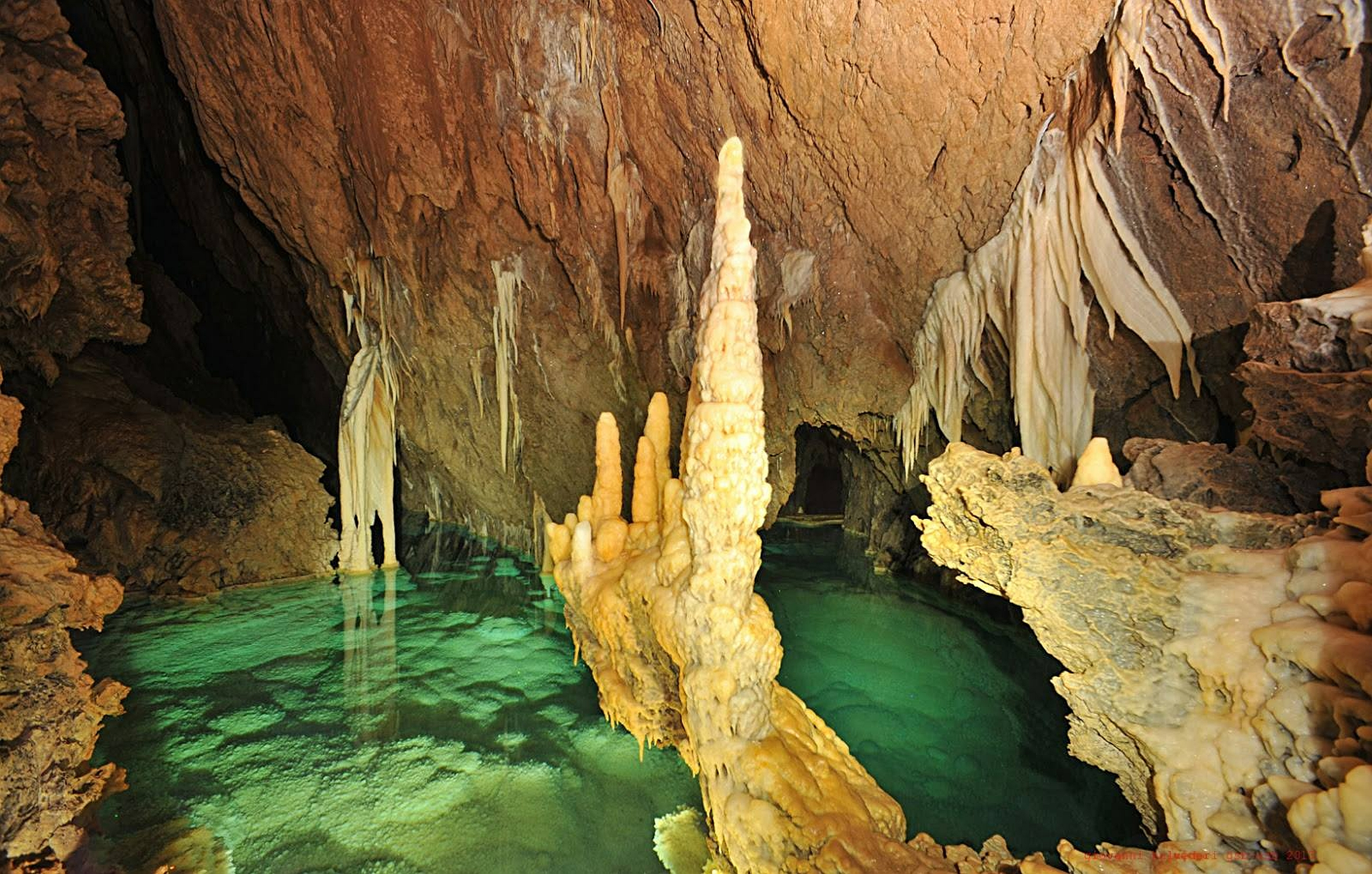
- Cave lake in Govještica

- Location within Bosnia and Herzegovina
- Location: Prača, Bosnia and Herzegovina
- Coordinates: 43.774134°N 18.888668°E
- Discovery: mid 20th century
- Geology: Karst

The Govještica cave, also known as Dugovještica cave, is located in the canyon of the Prača River, a left tributary of the Drina River, at the foot of the Romanija massif, about 40 kilometers east of Sarajevo, in Bosnia and Herzegovina. Administratively, the cave belongs to the municipality of Rogatica.

It is 9,682 meters long and is still in the research phase. Near this cave is the Mračna Pećina or Banj Stijena at a distance of less than one kilometer, and the third cave is Golubovićka, which can be approached from the direction of the Rogatica hamlet of Stjenica, which all together makes up a real complex of caves in one small area.

== History of research ==
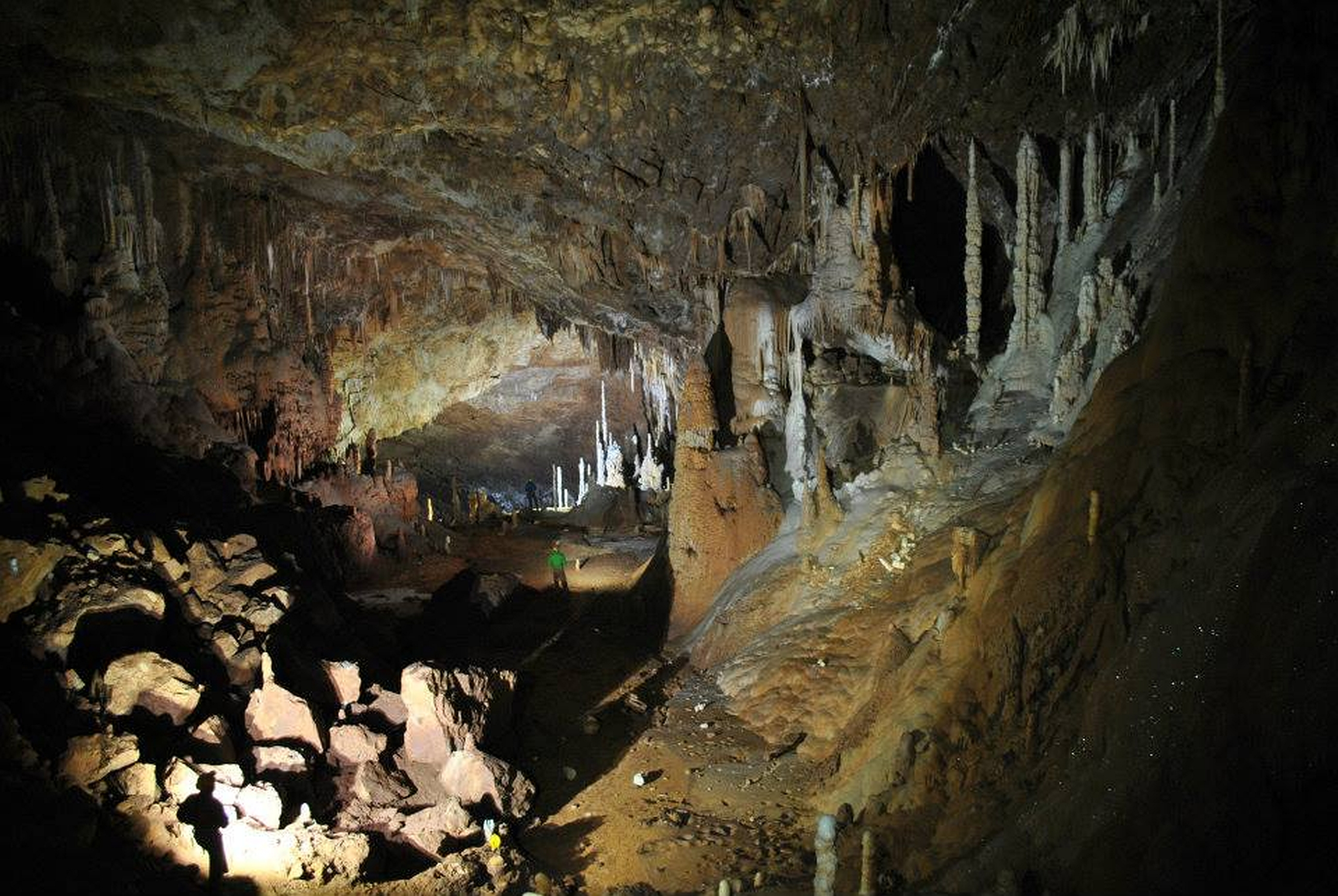
Corridors through the Govještica cave

Govještica Cave is located near Mračna Pećina, which has become famous since the beginning of the century, when it gained a certain tourist interest due to the construction of a Bosnian-gauge railway through the Prača Canyon.

Also, from that early period, several speleo-biological as well as paleontological investigations are mentioned in the literature, ending in the period 1960–1970. However, although some information was available for the Mračna Pećina (transl. Dark Cave) (its length was estimated to be around 1200 meters), very little was known about Govještica (or Dugovještica, as it is often called by the locals), apart from the impressive dimensions of the entrance and a map of the first 80–100 meters of its length.

Since 2010, an international team of speleologists from Italy and Bosnia and Herzegovina has begun a new, detailed exploration of these areas, including the plateau of the Romanija massif. Several new caves have been explored and documented, a detailed map of the Mračna Pećina has been created, confirming its previously estimated length of 1200 m, but the most significant and interesting research results come from the exploration of the Govještica Cave, with the length of the channels drawn so far being around 7600 m. One of the longest in Bosnia and Herzegovina, it is 9,682 meters long. It is believed to be connected to the Megara cave on Romanija, however, site is still in the research phase.

== Description ==
The explored underground passages, which include several large halls, are not only significant for their dimensions, but they also have very important natural, scientific and aesthetic values. A large colony of bats, numbering approximately a thousand individuals, was found in the cave. The wide distribution of the trilobite species Anthroherpon cylindricollis bodes well for future research into underground biodiversity. A large deposit of Ursus spelaeus bones has also been discovered in the cave, and in various passages the cave walls are covered with as yet unidentified fossils dating from the period of formation of the cave's rocks.

Most of the cave is covered with decorations of great aesthetic value, both for their shape and size. Some passages in the cave are filled with calcite crystals and unusual helicitie.

== Degree of protection ==
Govještica Cave was on the list of areas planned for protection. Now the cave is protected according to classification.

== Gallery ==
The photographs of the interior of Govještica, a.k.a. Dugovještica.

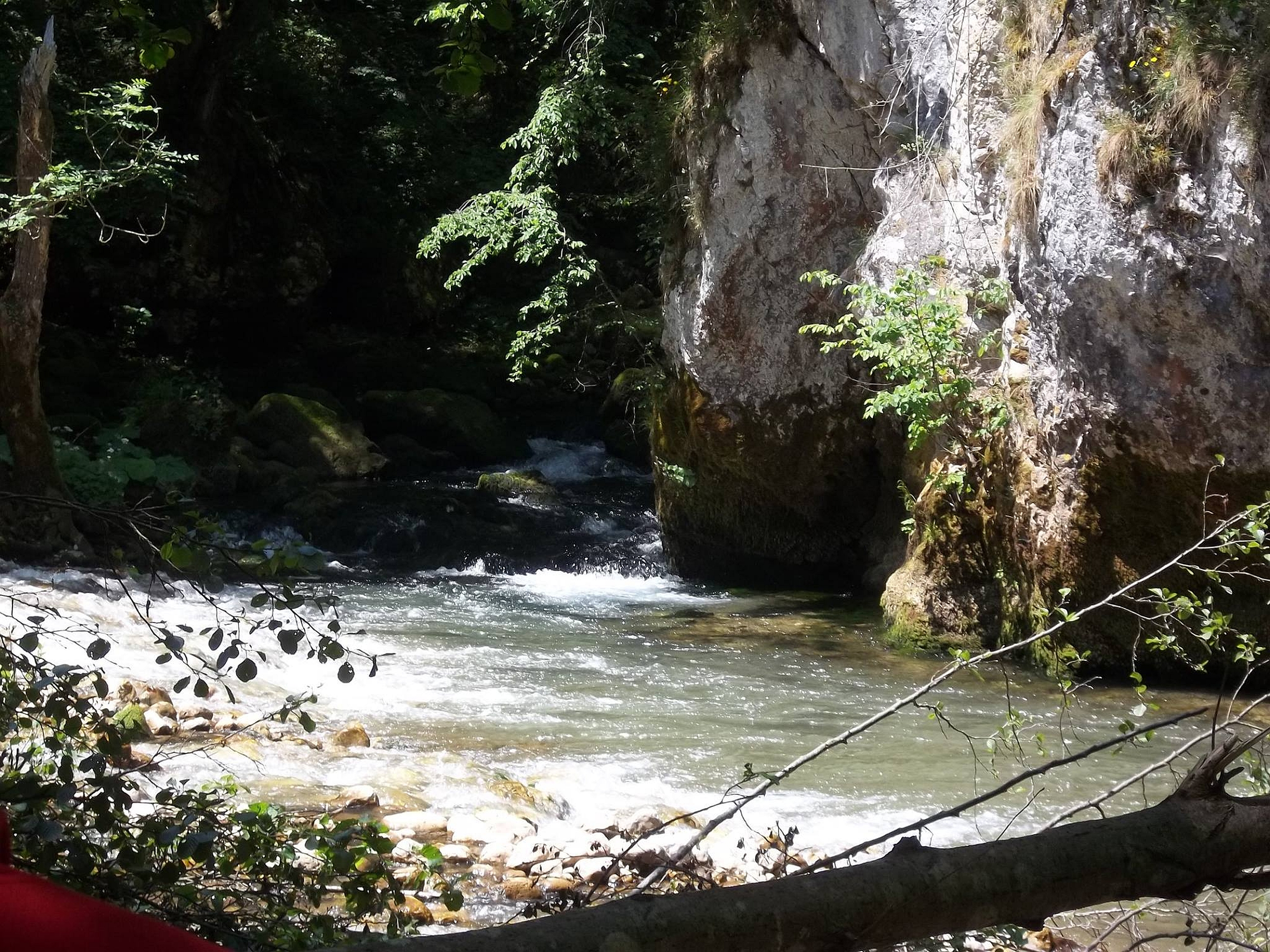

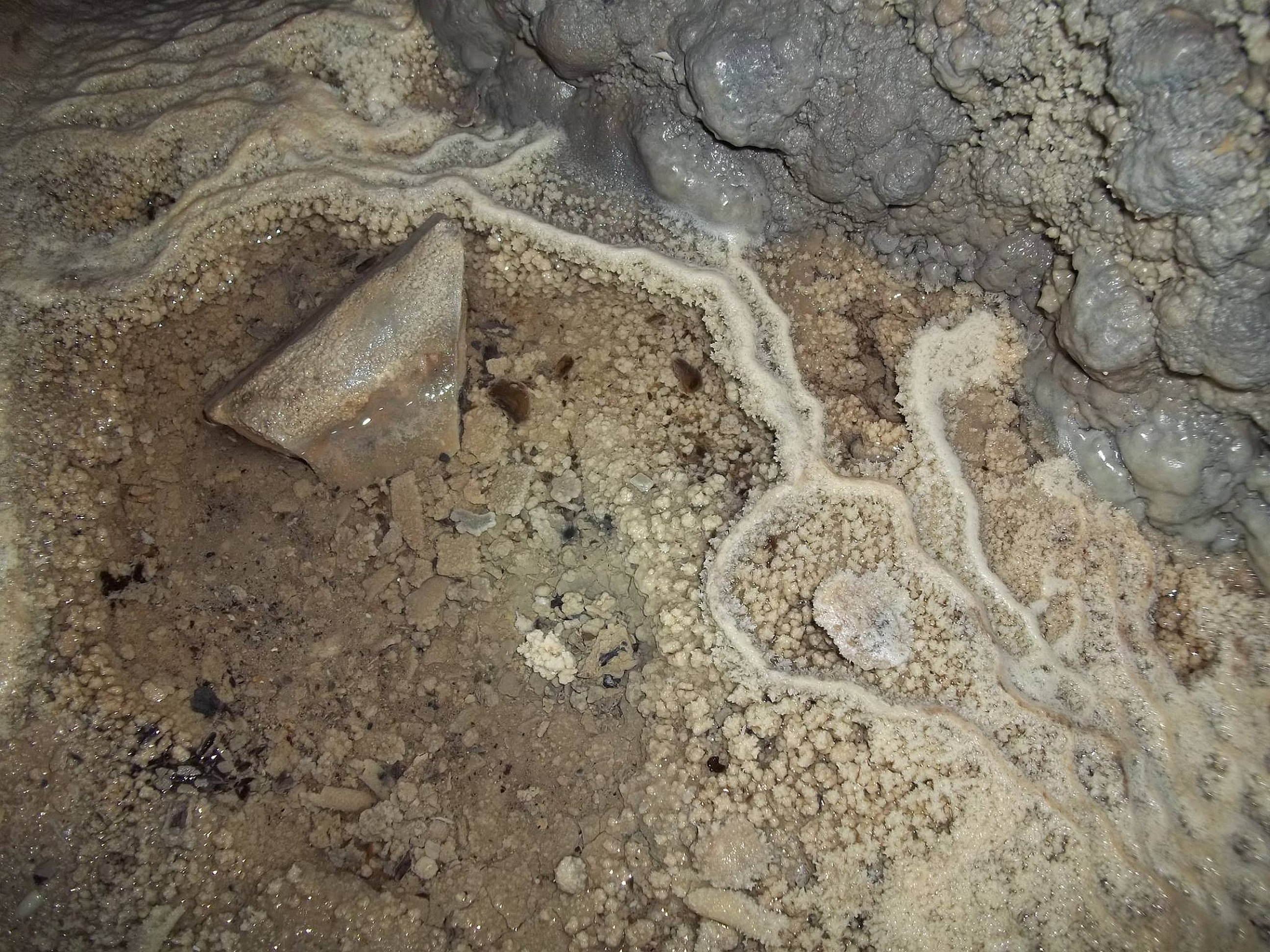

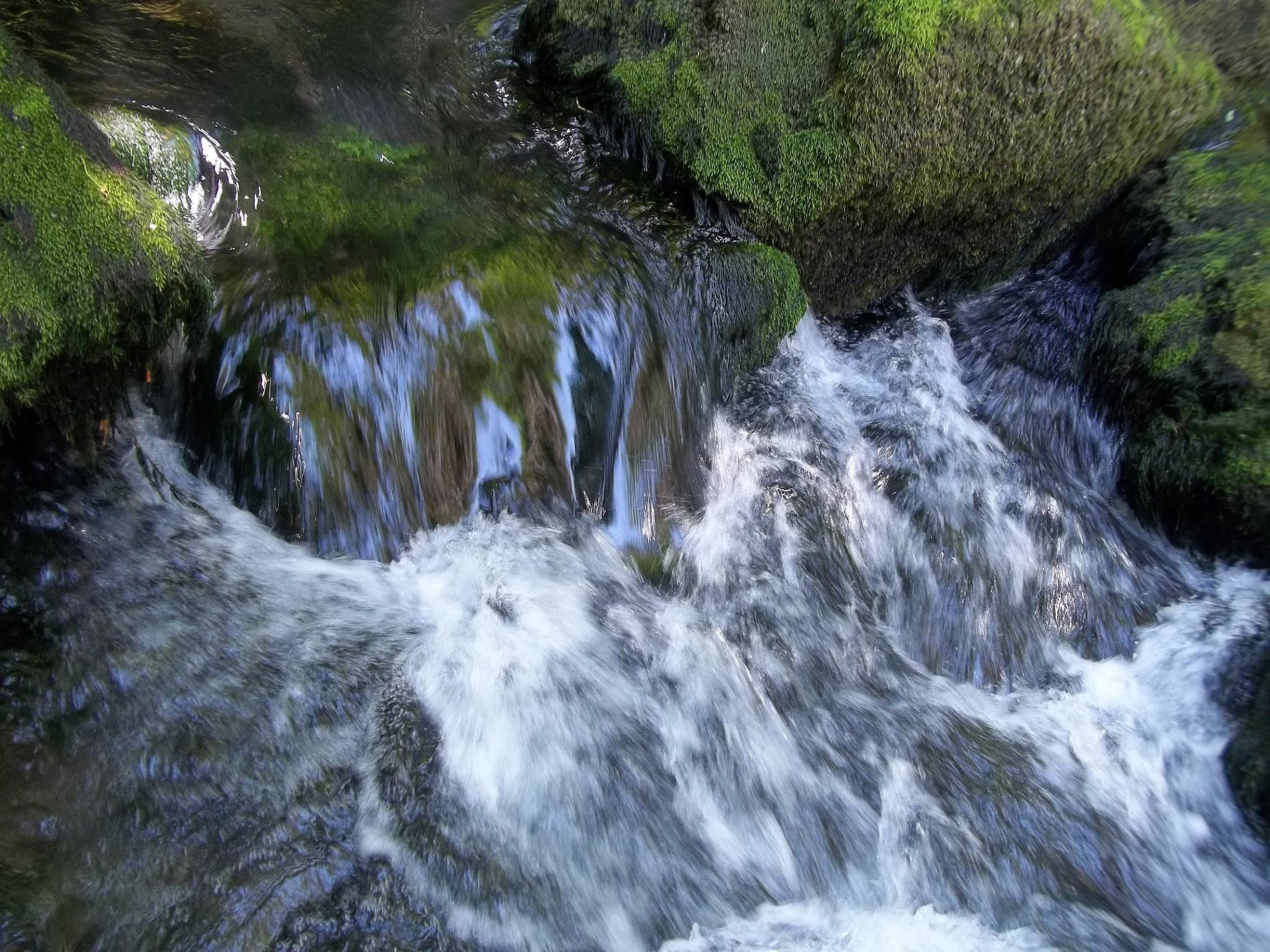

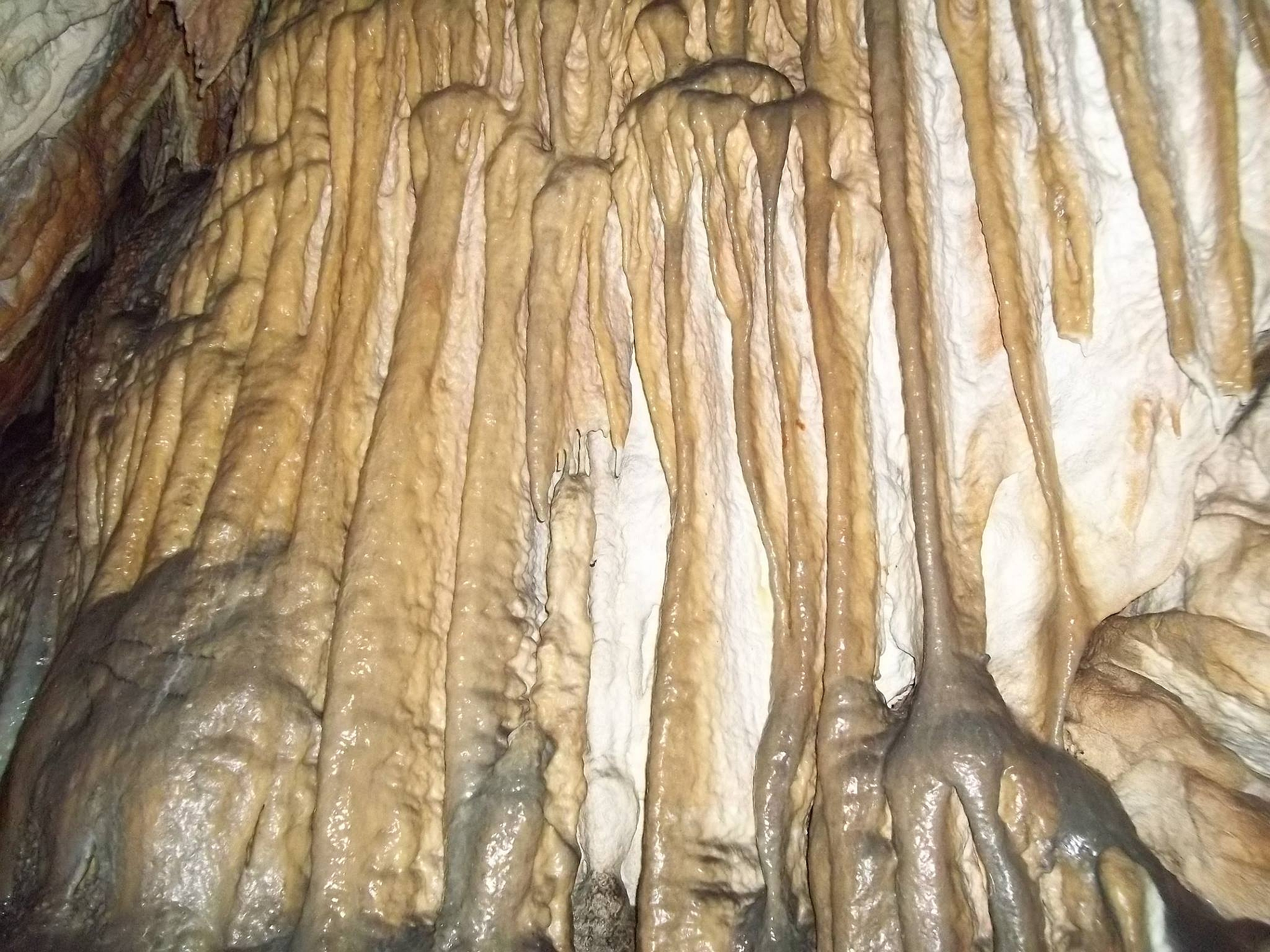

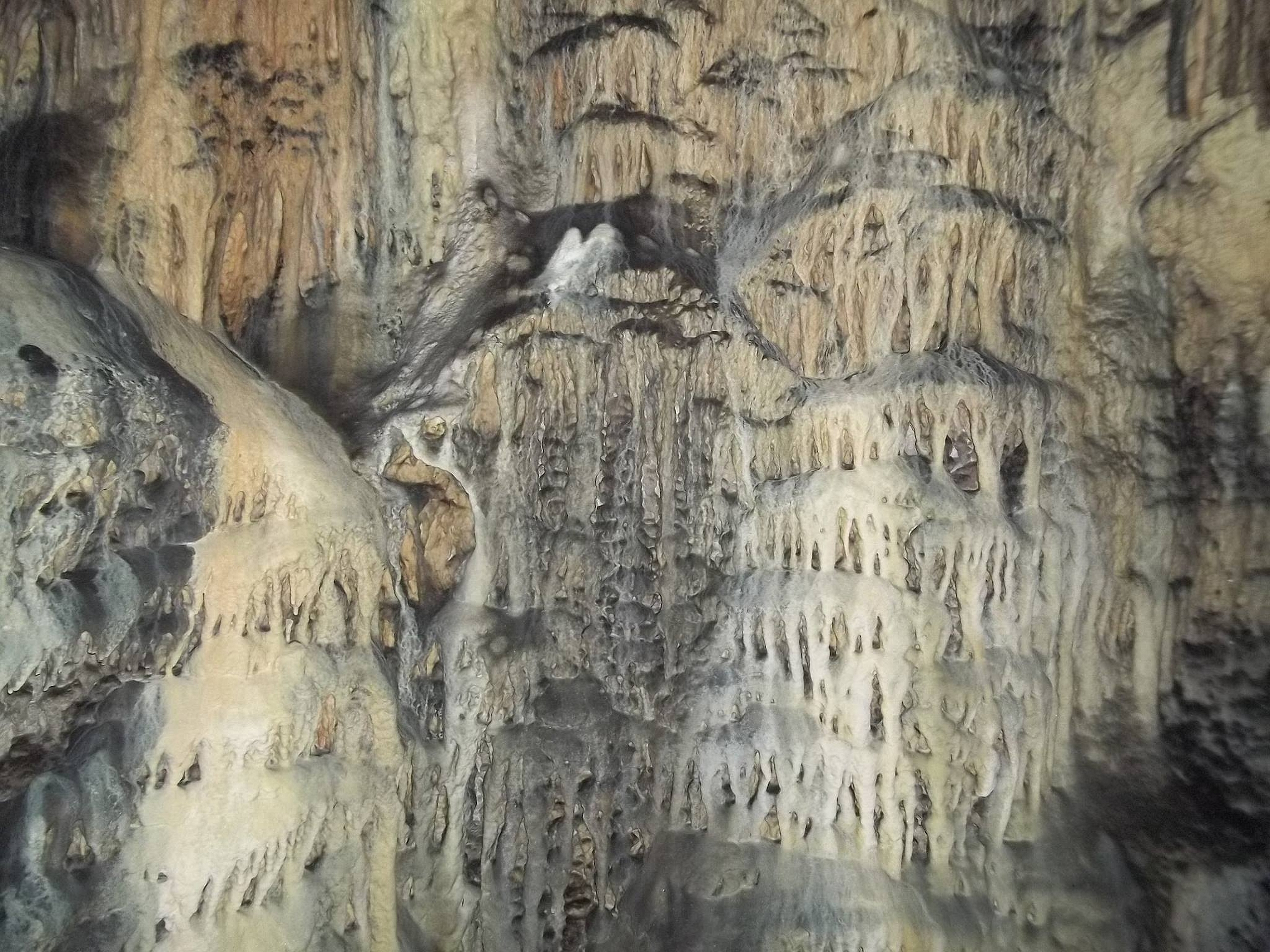

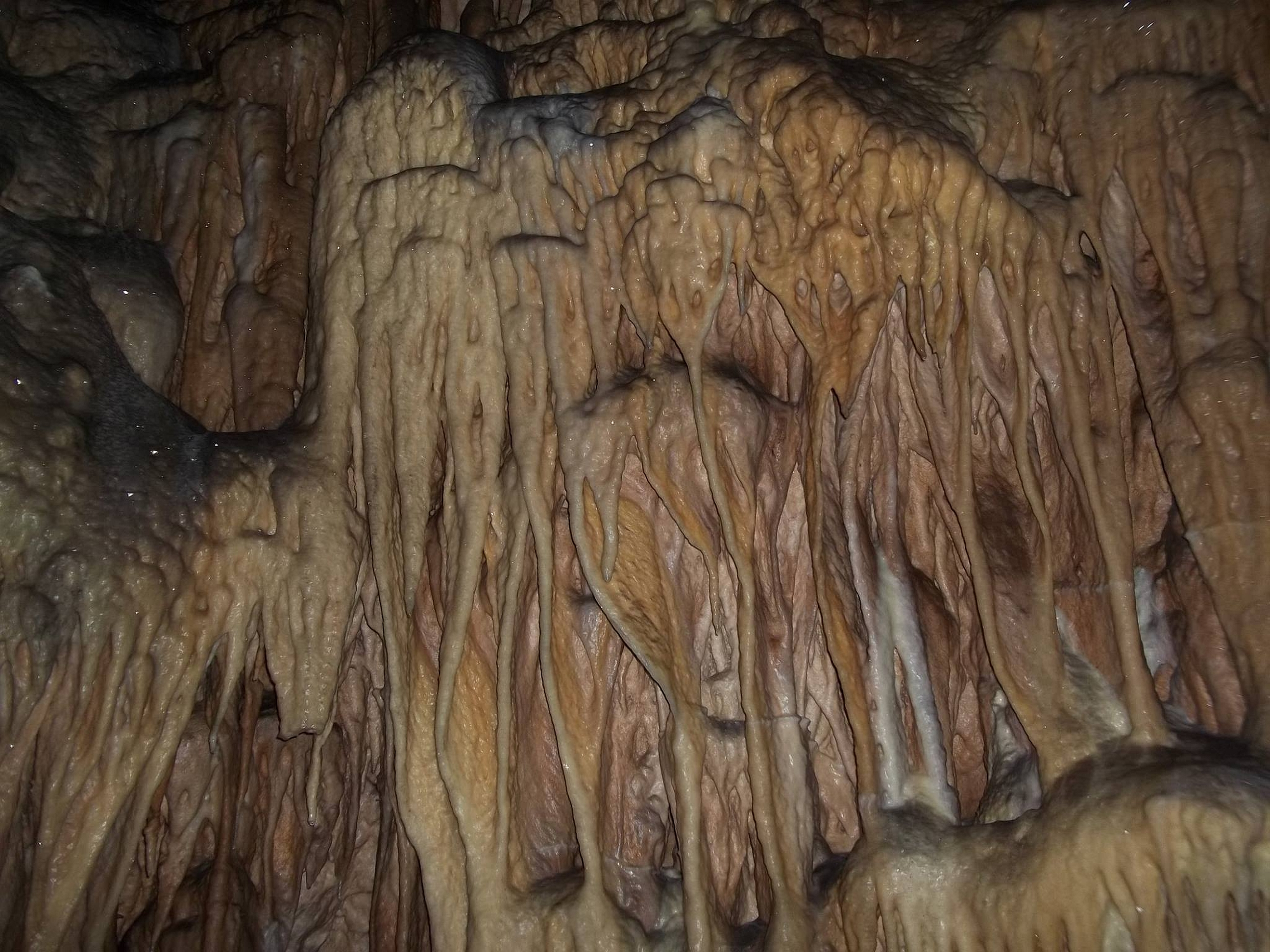

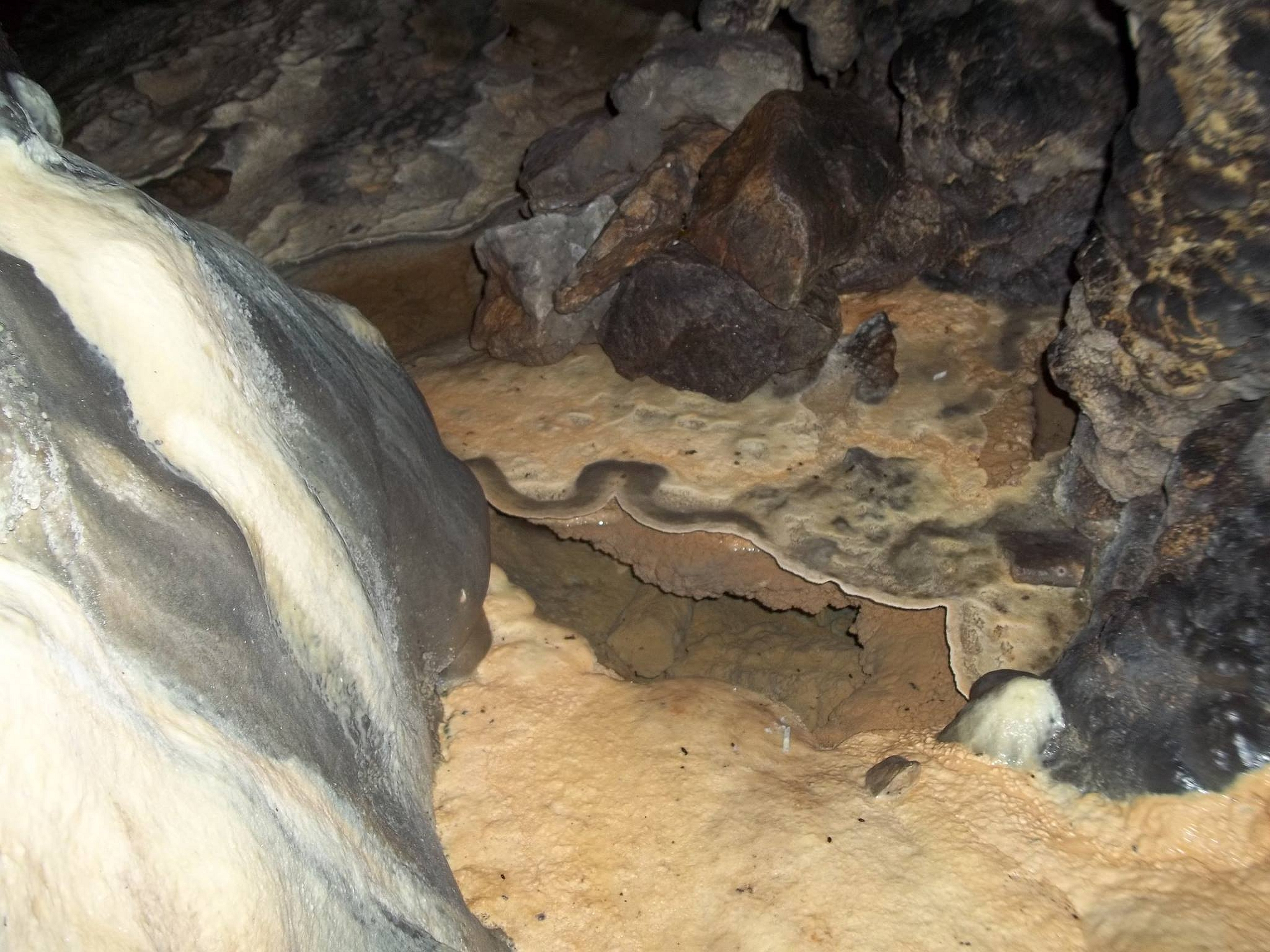

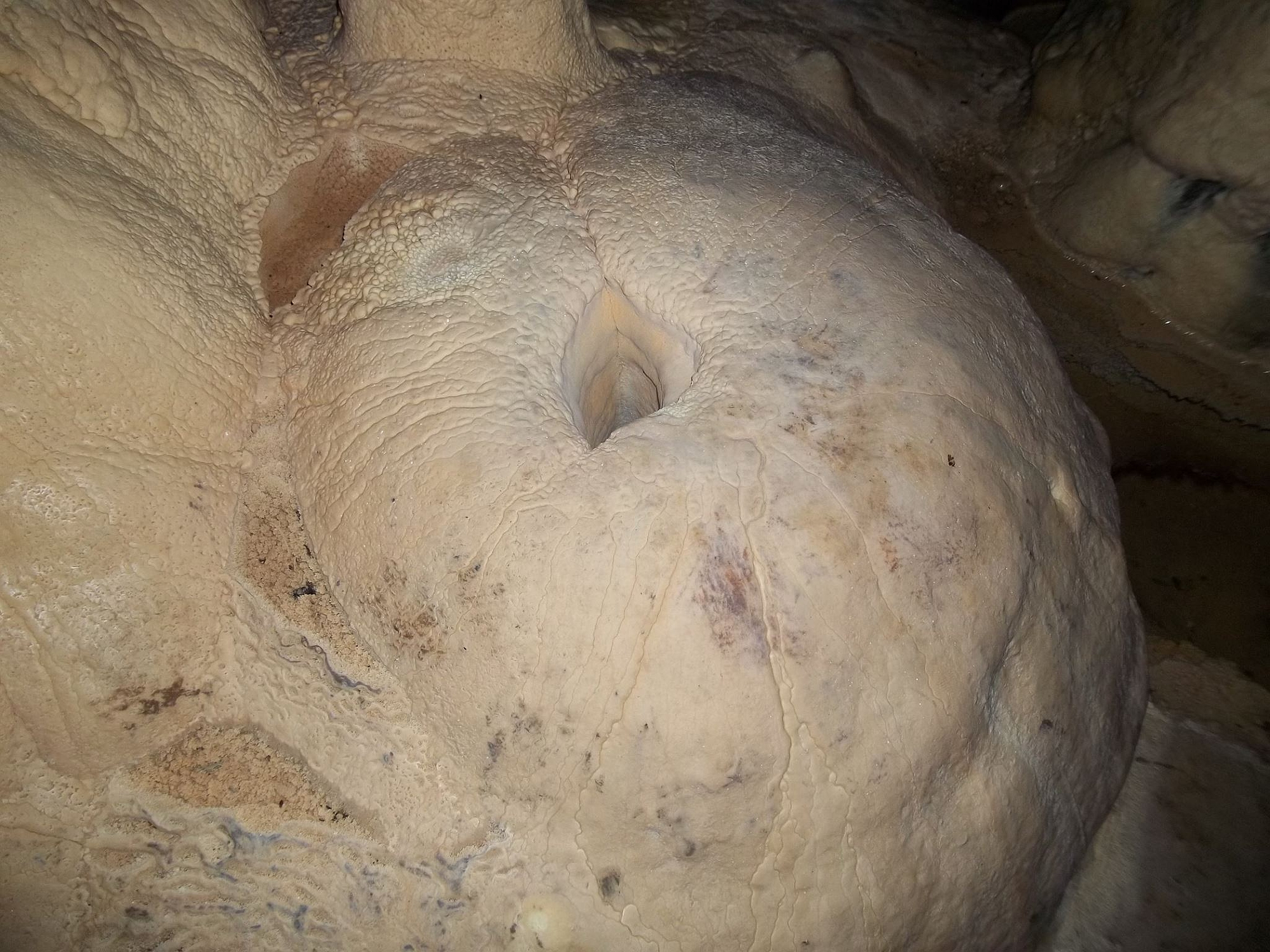

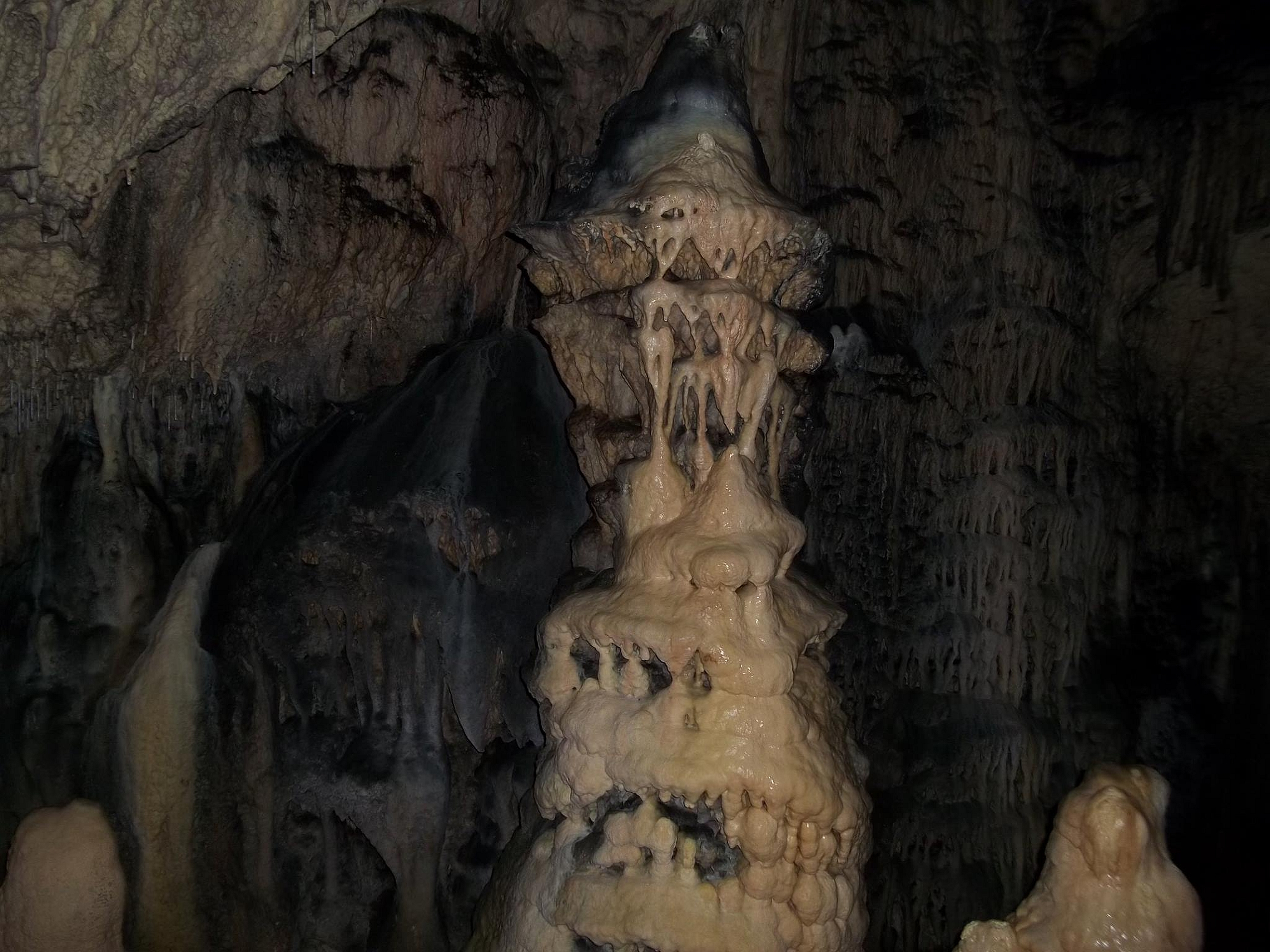

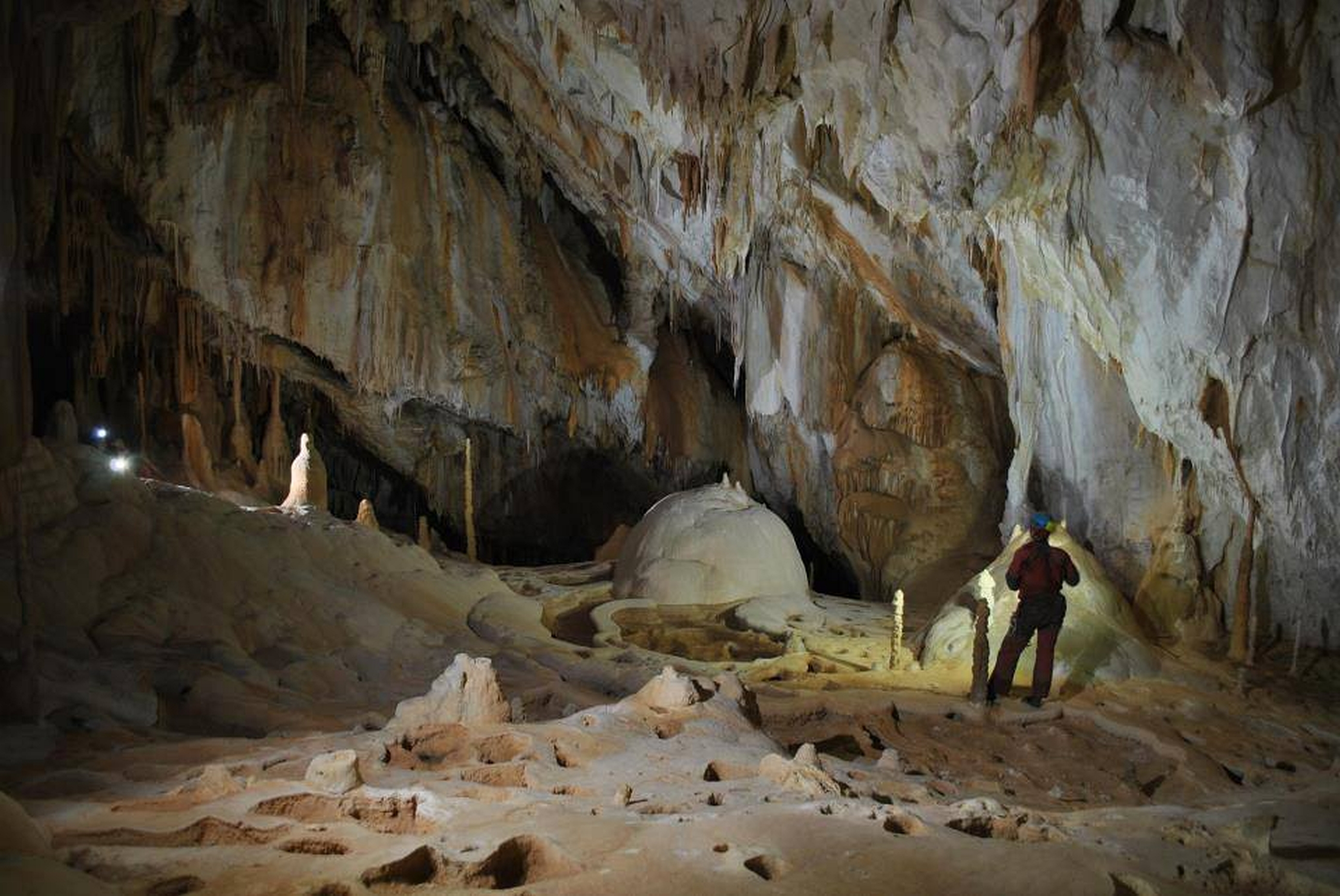

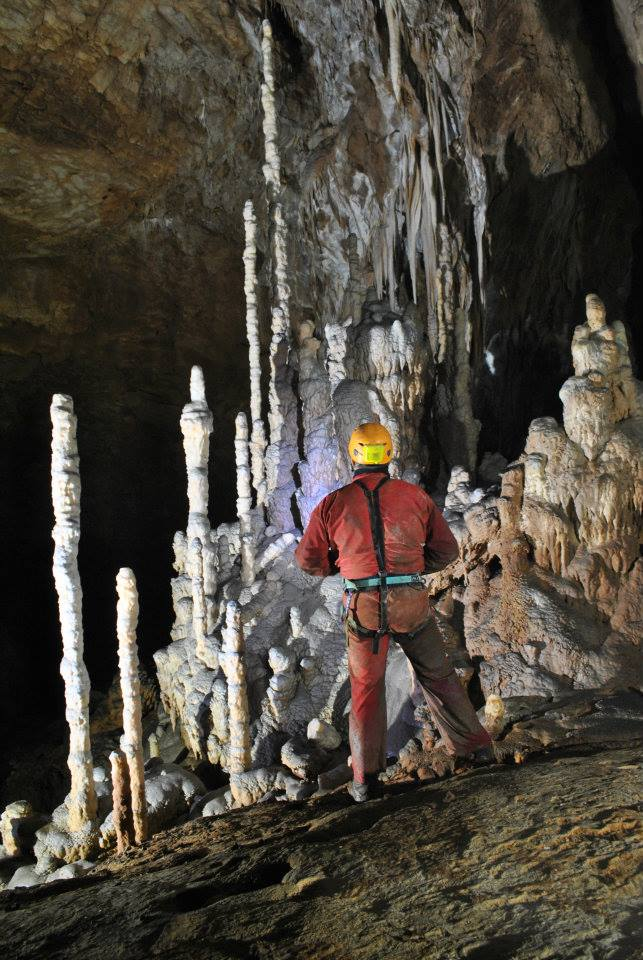

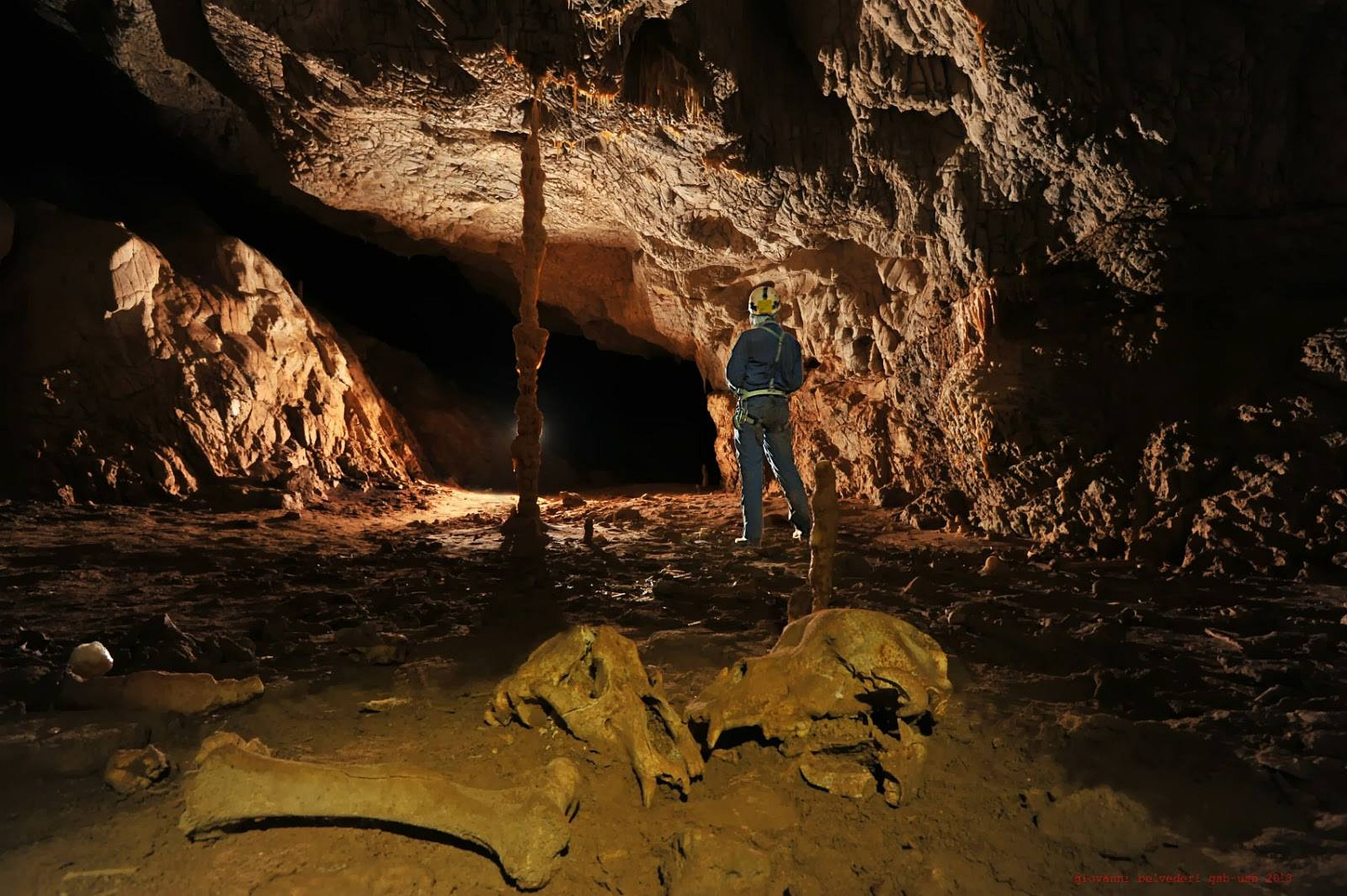

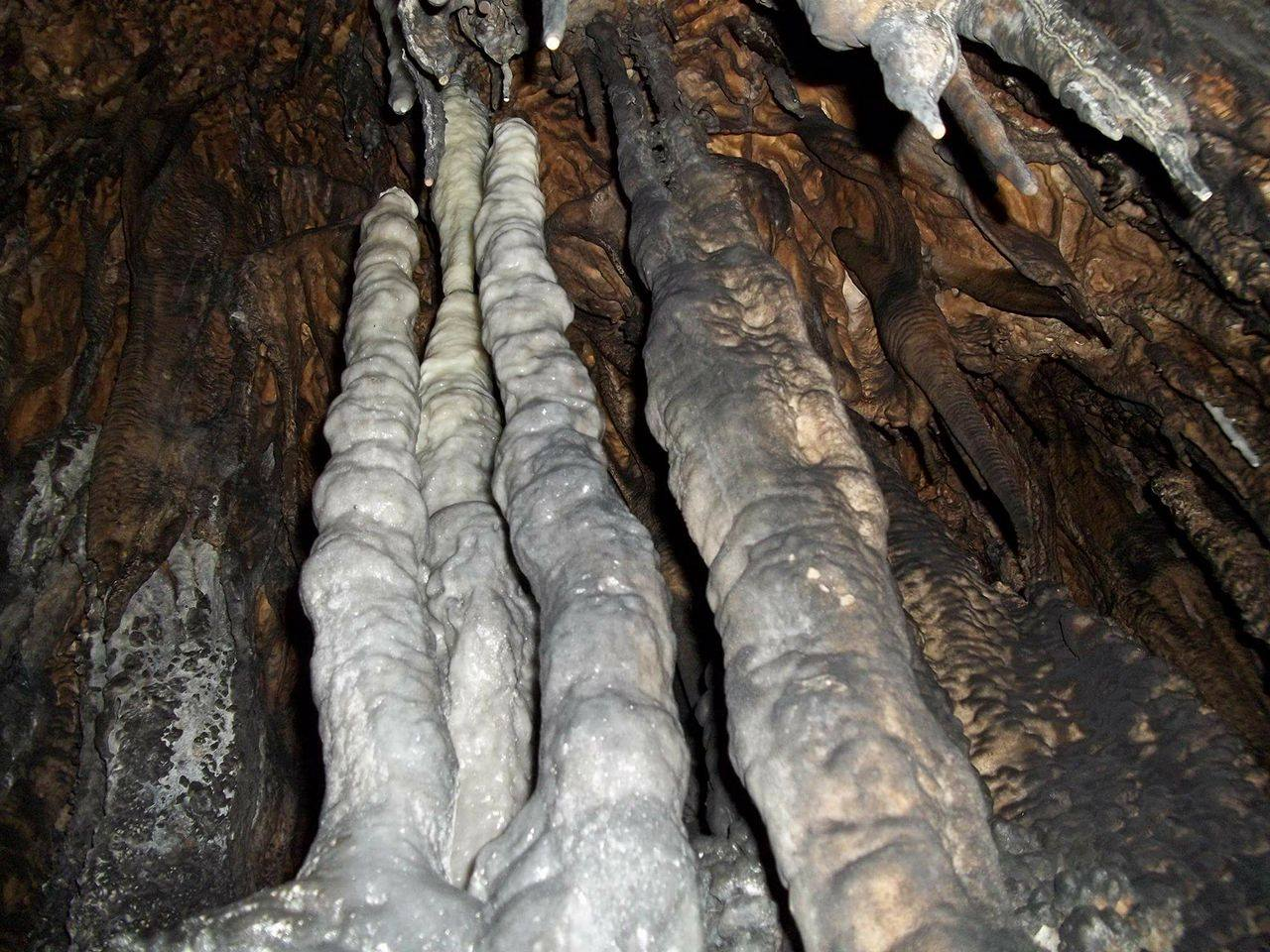

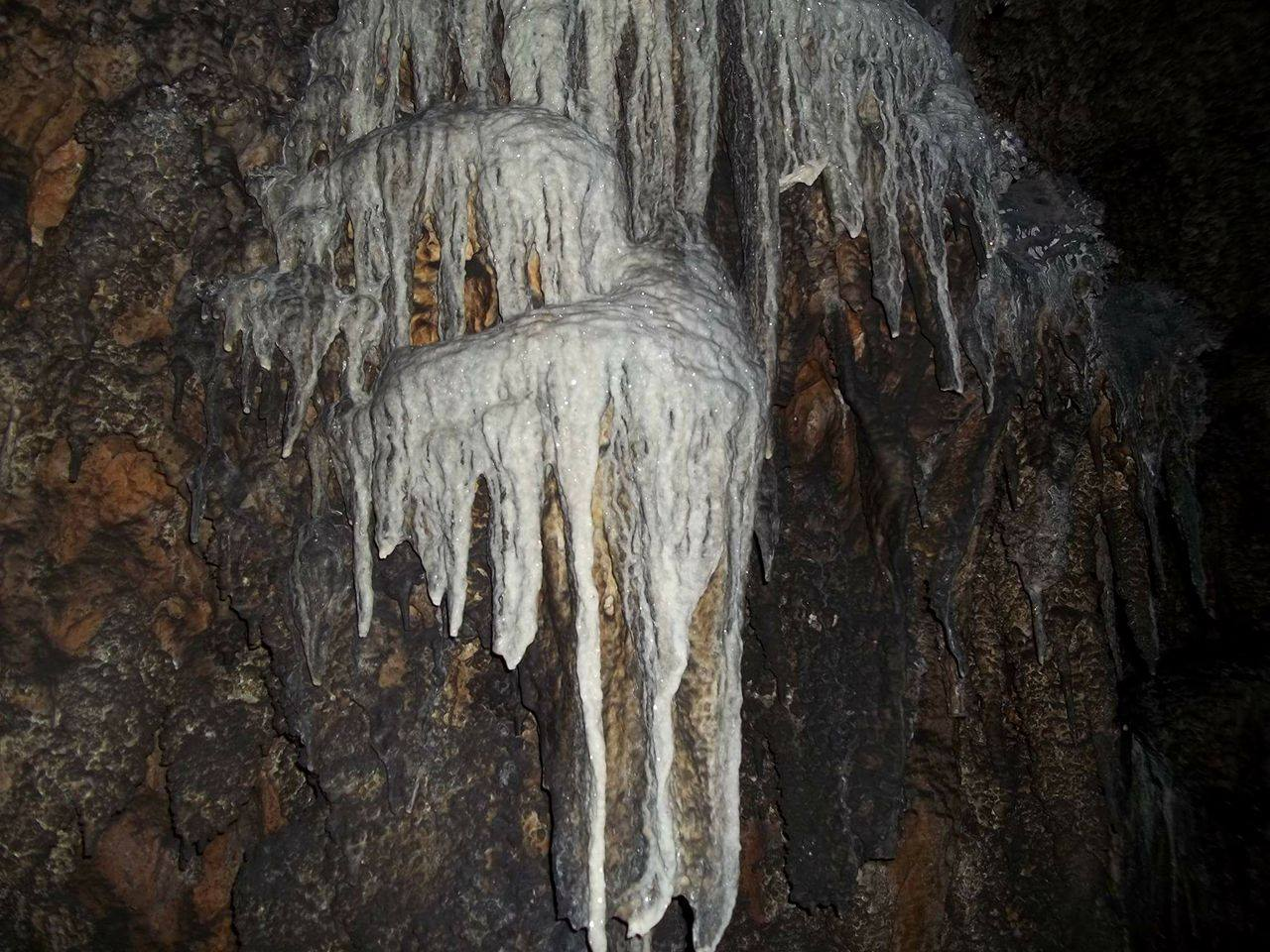

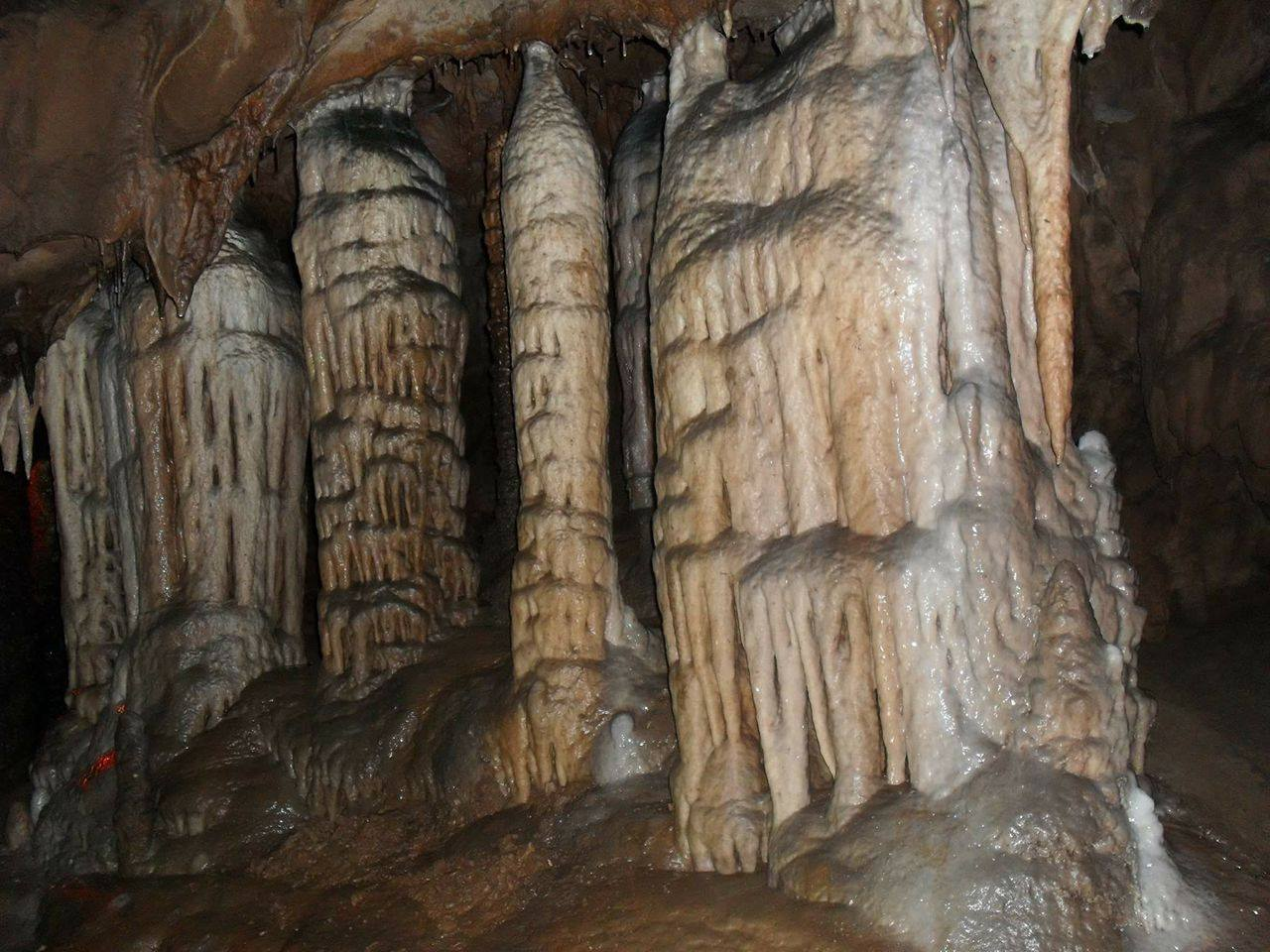

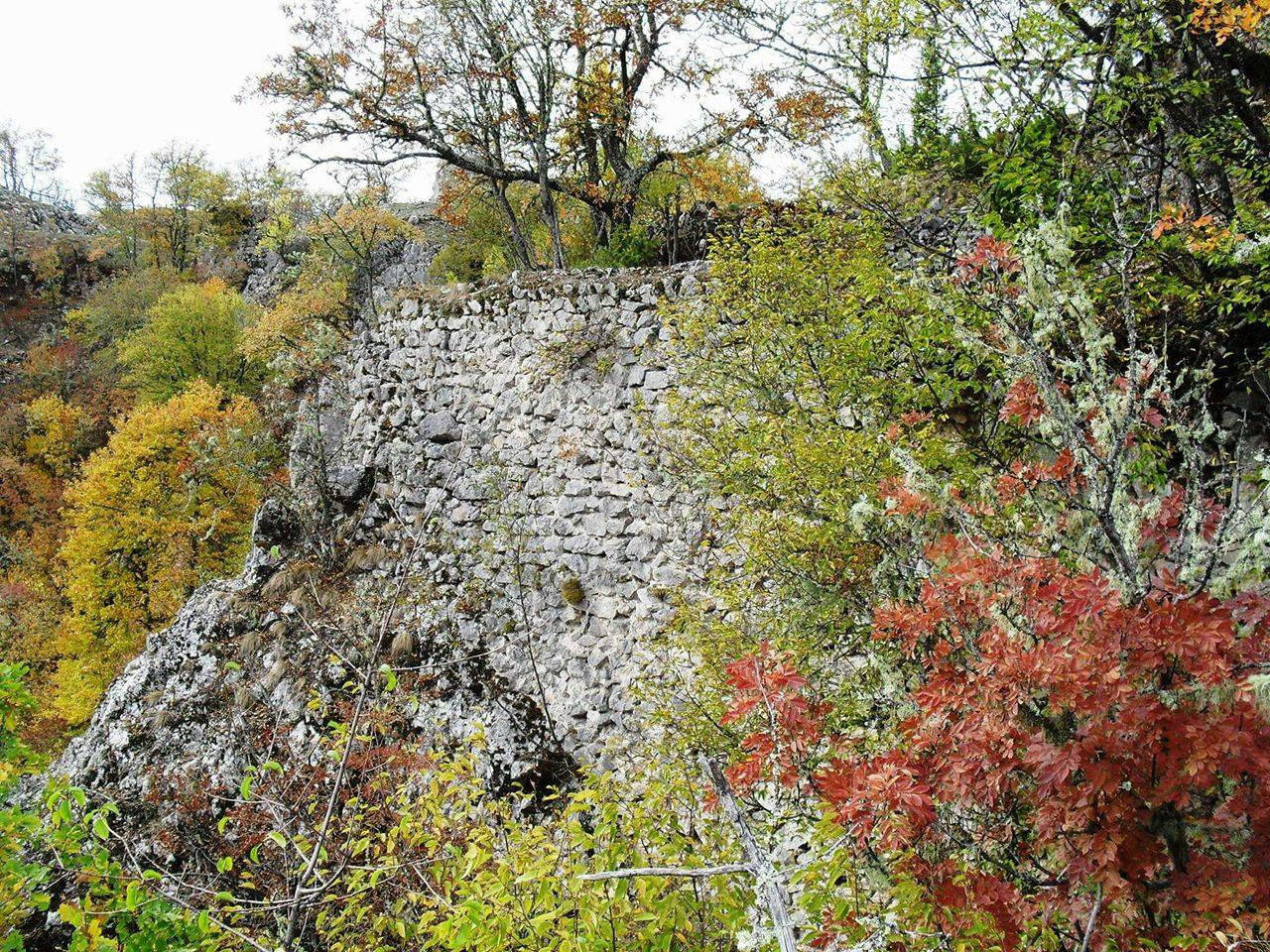

== See also ==
- List of caves in Bosnia and Herzegovina
- List of Dinaric caves

== Bibliography ==
- http://nasljedje.org/docs/pdf/pp_rs_2025.pdf
