= Vrelo Krušnice =

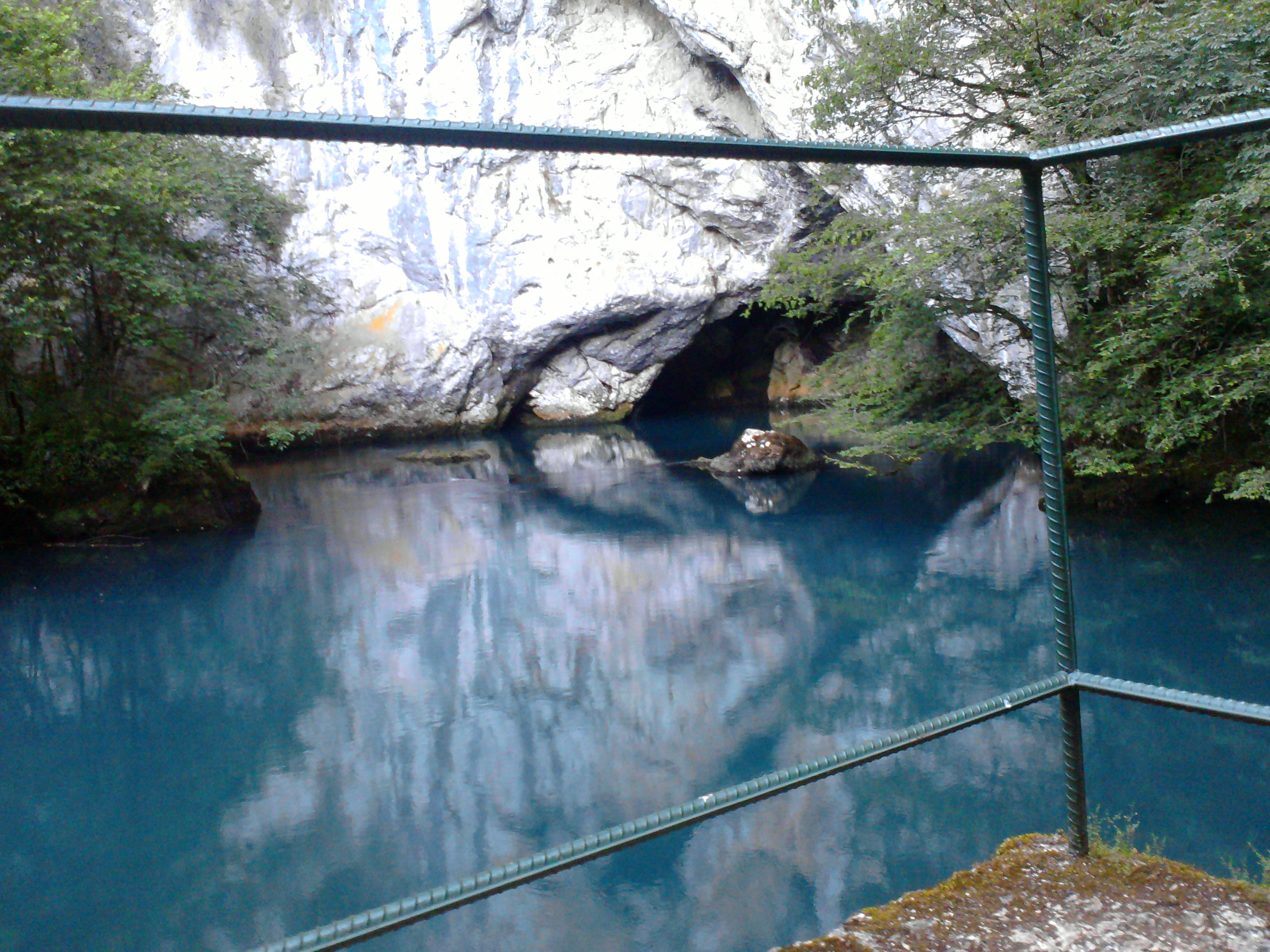

- Location within Bosnia and Herzegovina
- Location: Bosanska Krupa, Una-Sana Canton, Bosnia and Herzegovina
- Coordinates: 44.844545°N 16.1682969°E
- Length: 6.5 km (4.0 mi)

Vrelo Krušnice is a large karstic wellspring of the river Krušnica, located between Gudavac and Vranjska villages, municipality Bosanska Krupa, Una-Sana Canton, Bosnia and Herzegovina.
