= Banja Stijena =

Cave in Rogatica Municipality

- Banj Stijena, Ban Stijena (referring to medieval title)
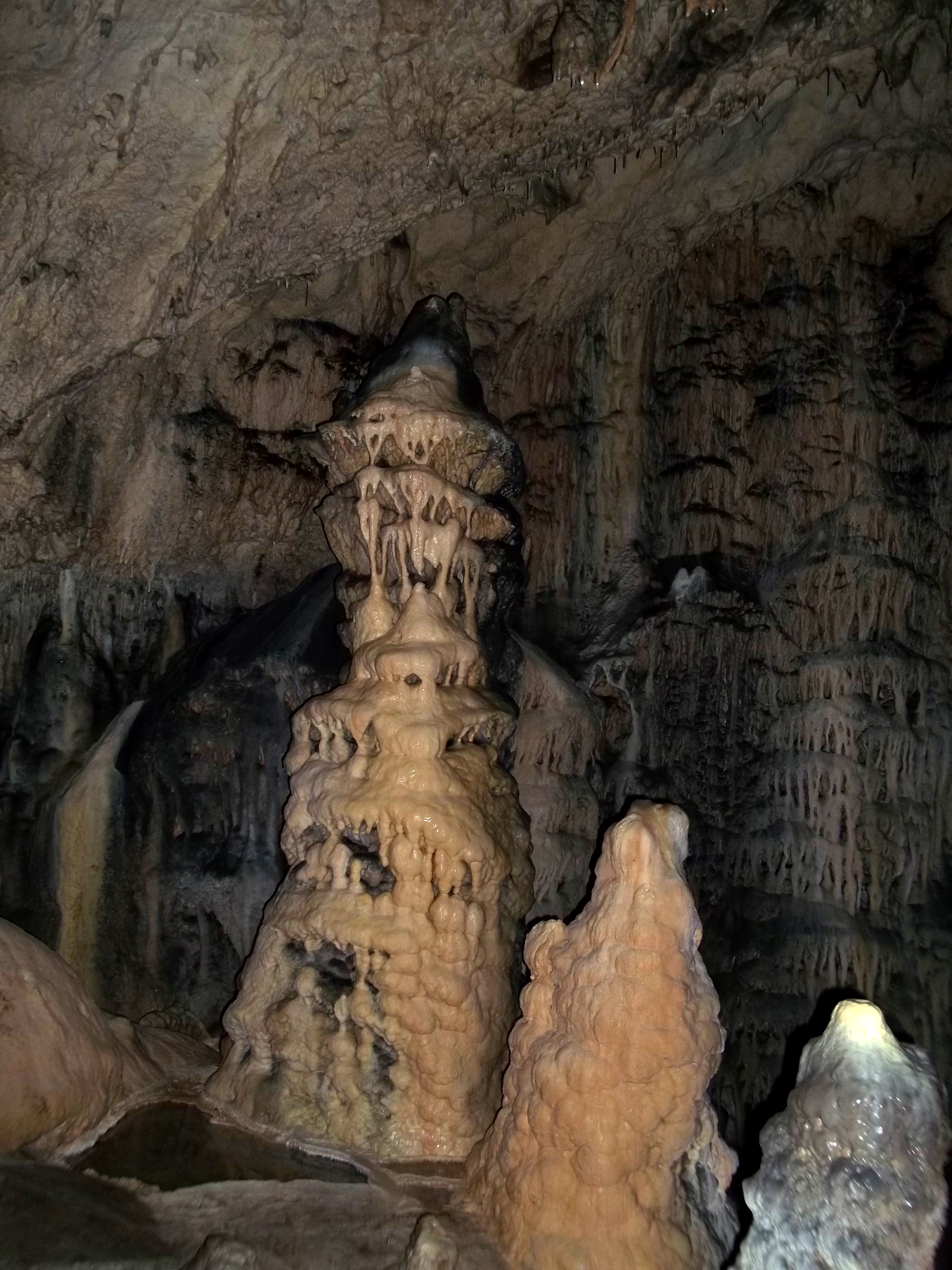
- The interior of Banja Stijena, a.k.a. Mračna

- Location within Bosnia and Herzegovina
- Location: Prača, Bosnia and Herzegovina
- Coordinates: 43.775250°N 18.889722°E
- Discovery: early 20th century
- Geology: Karst

Banja Stijena, also Banj Stijena, Ban Stijena (referring to medieval title), or Mračna Pećina (transl. Bath Cliff or Dark Cave), as locally known, is a cave in Bosnia and Herzegovina, located in the canyon of the river Prača, in close proximity to Govještica cave. The cave has an extensive channel system about 2,000 meters long. It is rich in various types of cave features. It was first mentioned in the early 20th century when constructing a railway through the canyon. Access to the cave was mined during the Bosnian War.

Banja Stijena cave is a special geological reserve.

== See also ==
- List of caves in Bosnia and Herzegovina
- List of longest Dinaric caves
