= Dabar (river) =

Dabar Дабар
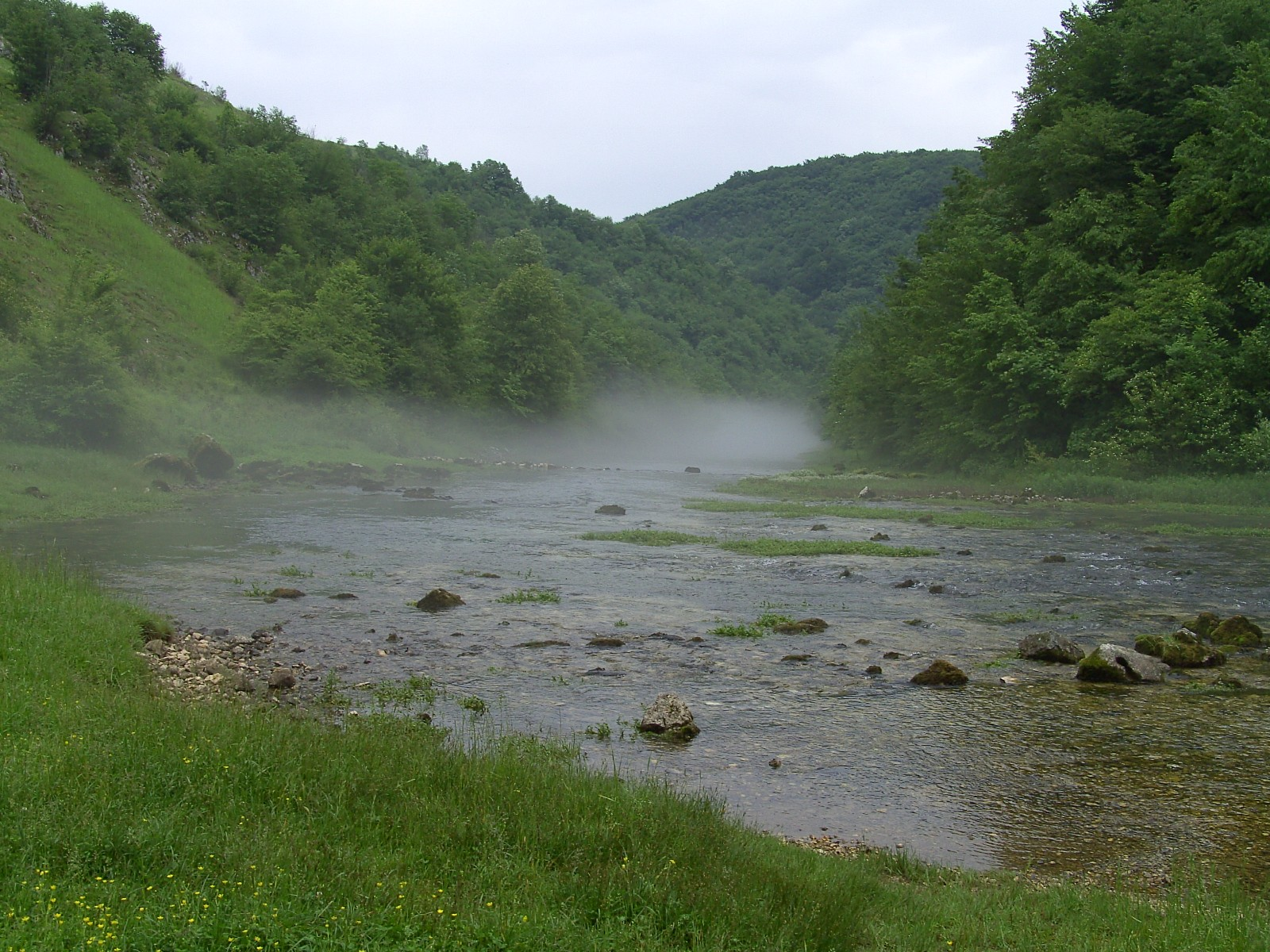

- Location within Bosnia and Herzegovina

Location
- Region: Bosanska Krajina
- Country: Bosnia and Herzegovina

Physical characteristics
- Source: Dabar Cave
  - location: Donji Dabar
  - coordinates: 44.709825°N 16.638709°E
- Mouth: Sana
  - location: Sanski Most
  - coordinates: 44.717381°N 16.676070°E
- Length: 4.5 km (2.8 mi)

Basin features
- Progression: Sana→Una→Sava→Danube→Black Sea
- River system: Danubian
- Landmarks: Dabar Cave, Mrin Fortress

Dabar (Cyrillic: Дабар, lit. 'Beaver') is a river in the Bosanska Krajina region of Bosnia and Herzegovina. It is a left tributary of the Sana River. The river Dabar emerges from Dabar Cave, and runs for 4.5 kilometres (2.8 mi) eastward towards the Sana river. The two rivers meet near Sanski Most, just 5 kilometres (3.1 mi) upstream from the town.

== See also ==
- List of rivers of Bosnia and Herzegovina
