= List of longest Dinaric caves =

This is a list of the longest caves in the Dinaric Alps. This region is known for its deep caves more than its long caves, in part because of the slow progress of cave exploration and in part because the recency and severity of the uplift is less favourable for the development of caves with extensive accessible passages. The cumulative explored passage length of all Dinaric caves is comparable to Mammoth Cave, presently the record-holder for most explored passageway.

Slovenia, Croatia, and Serbia each had national lists of longest caves in Yugoslav times, during which they were often compared. A continuously updated list is available for Slovenia. For Croatia, there is a periodically updated list of caves longer than 1 km and deeper than 250 m. The Katastar speleoloških objekata Republike Hrvatske remains closed to the public, but excerpts are available at Bioportal. The first list for Serbia was published in 1981, followed by an online list no longer updated after 2011. A list of all caves in Serbia longer than 100 m was published in 2022.

This list is incomplete, missing caves shorter than 1000 m (Croatia, Slovenia), and most long caves in the remaining republics, although the coverage for Serbia could be improved from published lists.

Name	Length	Depth	Massif	Number	Elevation	Sources
Crnopac system	63746	830	Crnopac	HR03054, ...	1043, ...	
Kačna jama	20200	280	Kraški visoravan	SI00955	435	
Predjama cave system	19561	168	Hrušica	SI00734	491	
Đalovića pećina	17500	120	Peštersko polje		835	
Đulin ponor - Medvedica system	16396*	83	Ogulinsko-plaščanska udolina	HR00728		
Munižaba	10538	510	Crnopac	HR03251	915	
Govještica	9870	5	Prača watershed	RS01752	580	
Tounjčica system	9104	46/124	Krpel	HR00692		
Križna jama	8273	32	Slivnica	SI00065	629	
Velika Karlovica	8057	20	Cerkniško polje	SI00087	548	
Vodna jama v Lozi	7748	75	Ravnik	SI00911	560	
Jama kod Rašpora	7361	391	Ćićarija	HR01883		
Zelške jame	7338	160	Rakov Škocjan	SI00576	506	
Velika ledena jama v Paradani	7311	858	Trnovski gozd	SI00742	1135	
Veternica	7128	50	Zagrebačka gora	HR00118	306	
Pećina izvora Mokranjske Miljacke	7100		Bosna watershed			
Vjetrenica	7013.9		Popovo Polje		260	
Planinska jama	6859	65	Planinsko polje	SI00748	453	
Jopićeva špilja - Bent system	6710*	57	Korana watershed	HR02370		
Zračak nade II - Kaverna u tunelu Učka system	6596	430	Učka			
Slovačka jama	6416	1324	Velebit (Rožanski kukovi)	HR03265		
Njegoš pećina	6200	383	Njeguško polje		874	
Dragov ponor	6185	65	Peštersko polje			
Ušački pećinski sistem	6185	65	Peštersko polje		1020, 980, 955	
Škocjanske jame	6138	254	Kraški visoravan	SI00735	271	
Dimnice	6020	134	Matarsko podolje	SI00736	565	
Žirovcova jama	5994	106	Polhograjsko hribovje	SI10000	621	
Davorjevo brezno	5887	304	Podgrajsko podolje	SI10060	508	
Kotluša	5436	26	Cetina watershed	HR03165		
Najdena jama	5216	121	Menišija	SI00259	517	
Gospodska špilja - Glavaš system	4982	157	Cetina watershed	HR03246		
Logarček	4888	120	Menišija	SI00028	498	
Podpeška jama	4390	20	Dobrepolje	SI00017	441	
Donja Cerovačka špilja	4207	68/97	Crnopac			
Gornja Cerovačka špilja	4036	192/202	Crnopac			
Lukina jama - Trojama system	3741	1431	Velebit (Hajdučki kukovi)	HR01481	1475, 1438	
Kétlyukú barlang	3600	715	Lovćen		1360	
Lipska pećina	3410		Dobrsko polje		480	
Nedam	3399	1335	Velebit (Hajdučki kukovi)		1430	
Podstenska jama	3376	60	Ribniška dolina	SI03882	556	
Gašpinova jama	3375	103	Logateško polje	SI08000	483	
Miljacka II	3365	29/50	Krka watershed			
Železna jama	3360	1162	Maganik		1767	
Velebita system	3346	1026	Velebit (Hajdučki kukovi)	HR02371	1557	
Ferranova buža	3093	358	Ulovka	SI08085	657	
Vilina špilja - Izvor Omble	3050*	229	Ombla watershed	HR02919		
Kusa II	3010	16	Zrmanja watershed (Krupa)	HR00317		
Vrulja Modrić	2898	37	Velebit (Uvala Modrić)			
Tkalca jama	2885	71	Rakov Škocjan	SI00857	492	
Mandelaja	2835	96	Krpel	HR01728		
Ponorac - Jovina pećina system	2834	4	Korana watershed	HR01722		
Viršnica	2796	60	Ilova gora	SI00571	339	
Velika pećina	2800		Fatiničko polje			
Jama Duša	2781	318	Crnopac	HR02340	975	
Ocizeljska jama	2780	150	Dolina Glinščice	SI01003	349	
Marijino brezno	2762	69	Loško pogorje	SI00006	423	
Miljacka I i V	2707	57/68	Krka watershed			
Obrh Čolniči	2700	61	Cerkniško polje	SI09964	551	
Jamski sistem u Obručinama	>2680	464	Durmitor (Žabljak)		2135	
Grbočica	2650	87	Svinštik		390	
Hotiške ponikve	2644	180	Matarsko podolje	SI01173	536	
Pećina Orlovača	2500		Sarajevski Ozren			
Špilja za Gromačkom vlakom	2439	220	Neprobićka gora	HR02369		
Čaganka	2431	475	Kočevski rog	SI09500	690	
Jama Atila	2410	42/59	Velebit (Pazarište)	HR02466		
Klementina I	2403*	269	Velebit (Klementa)			
Lubuška jama	2395	529	Velebit (Hajdučki kukovi)	HR01466	1495	
Jama Ebenthal	2327	125	Polomsko podolje	SI06842	380	
Izvor Gojak	2312	28	Dobra watershed	HR01466		
Duboki do	>2247	506	Njeguško polje		997	
Markov ponor	2240	69/84	Kosinjsko polje	HR01480		
Pucov brezen	2235	110	Polhograjsko hribovje	SI01777	633	
Jazbina v Rovnjah	2233	160	Matarsko podolje	SI06280	484	
Golubnjača u Grulovićima	2189	73	Bukovica	HR00250		
Začirska pećina	2180	201	Ceklinsko polje		445	
Provala	2161	55	Žumberačka gora	HR00758		
Ponor Bregi	2110*	269	Istria			
Jaskinia Gornicza	2083	585	Prokletije (Bjelič)		2019	
Jama na Javoru	2060	103	Crnopac			
Bela griža 1	2054	884	Trnovski gozd	SI07937	1198	
Jama Bogoš	2000	279	Gornji Vršanj			
Opasna jama	>2000	>500	Žijovo		1355	
Jama na Javoru	1985*		Sniježnica			
Pećina Đalto	1970		Koritska visoravan			
Jankovićeva špilja (Adios)	1969	40/47	Korana watershed	HR02796		
Jaskinia Lodowa	1956	451	Prokletije (Bjelič)		1945	
Jama na Vjetrenim brdima	1951	775	Durmitor		2175	
Jama Njemica	1935	982	Biokovo	HR02049		
Vipavska jama	1932	64	Vipavska dolina	SI01752	98	
Tubića pećina	1929		Uvac watershed			
Ponor polne lune	1873	370	Banjška planota	SI07000	566	
Kostanjeviška jama	1871	47	Žumberačka gora	SI00518	170	
Jama u Malom Lomnom dolu	>1870	605	Durmitor (Žabljak)		2098	
Lisičina pod Ponikvo	1858	46	Žumberačka gora	SI01376	292	
Dol ledenica	1822	543	Trnovski gozd	SI09112	1130	
Izvor Ličanke	1816	48/64	Lič polje			
X1108	1799	272	Durmitor (Žabljak)		2193	
Ponor Sušik	1780	9	Drežničko polje			
A-1 - Vilimova jama system	1732	589	Biokovo			
Lenčkova jama	1730	177	Nanos	SI001012	634	
Kozí Díra	1714	662	Orjen (Krivošije)		1011	
Pipalska pećina	1712		Đetinja watershed			
Ponor Vinicio Potleca	1708	176	Istria	HR02472		
Zečja rupa	1700	400	Njeguško polje		1112	
Punar u Luci	1695	350	Pusto polje	HR02357	1075	
Stopića pećina	1691.5		Prištavica watershed		711.2	
Suhadolca	1690	53	Cerkniško polje	SI00280	550	
Cetinjska pećina	1680	57	Cetinjsko polje		668	
Fliš	1672	582	Durmitor (Žabljak)		2080	
Babina jama	1672*	52.3	Ličko polje			
Jaskinia Gigant	1635	296	Prokletije (Bjelič)		2116	
Dragića pećina II	1625*	78	Cetina watershed	HR00838		
Niby Czarna-Babina sisa system	1611	236	Prokletije (Bjelič)		1885	
Osapska jama	1607	54	Osapska dolina	SI01154	106	
Jama Amfora	1604	706	Velebit (Rožanski kukovi)		1595	
Željnske jame	1600	12	Kočevsko polje	SI00012	475	
Bedara	1593	113	Žumberačka gora			
Mokre noge	1563	831	Biokovo	HR03154		
Prepadna jama	1557	151	Gotenica-Reka plateau	SI02566	514	
Velka Vrulja	1554	76	Velebit (Paklenica)			
Jama Sežanske reke	1501	394	Kraški visoravan	SI10589	354	
Propast Pema	>1500	318	Orjen		680	
Pekel pri Zalogu	1500	40	Kozjačko pohorje	SI00553	302	
Ponor Vele vode	1495*	118	Snežnik (Grobničko gorje)	HR00549		
Flanjkova špilja	1488	40	Korana watershed	HR00339		
Vranjedolska jama	1476	111	Cerkniško polje	SI15400	643	
Javorniška jama	1456	119	Cerkniško polje	SI10357	636	
Vukelića pećina	1448		Cetina watershed	HR03382		
Vukelića pećina	1437	60	Ličko polje	HR00551		
Radavačka pećina	1420		Prokletije			
Pogorelica	1416	34	Prača watershed	RS02939	586	
Dihalnik v Grdem dolu	1415	89	Slivnica	SI06286	656	
Habečkov brezen	1402	476	Trnovski gozd	SI00487	668	
Bukovik pećina	1402		Peštersko polje			
Lipiška jama	1400	250	Kraški visoravan	SI00311	395	
Bločica	1380	38	Slivnica	SI11000	608	
Jama 1 v Kanjaducah	1332	329	Kraški visoravan	SI00276	352	
Ponikve v Jezerini	1321	63	Matarsko podolje	SI04584	489	
Tajna jama 1	1300	30	Kozjačko pohorje	SI00527	309	
Girska pećina	1300		Romanija			
Kreščak	1279	38	Žumberačka gora	SI05849	293	
Ponor Kolinasi	1278	119	Ćićarija	HR03751		
Dolača	1262	155	Žumberačka gora	HR00591		
Matešićeva - Popovačka system	1246	24	Korana watershed	HR00957		
Jama	1244	56	Maganik		350	
Revenov brezen	1236	95	Polhograjsko hribovje	SI00623	621	
Fantomska jama	1218	477	Velebit (Visočica)		HR01668	
Vrulja Zečica	1210	49	Velebit (Uvala Modrić)			
Mijatova jama	1204*		Mrežnica watershed			
Banja Stijena	>1198	37	Prača watershed	RS01335	597	
Hajdova hiža	1188*	65	Kupa watershed	HR01835		
Župan pećina	1187	22	Bjelasica		1205	
Novokrajska jama	1180	164	Brkini	SI00810	470	
Izvir Bilpa	1180	41	Kolpska dolina	SI06924	198	
Lokvarka	1179*	286	Lokvarsko polje		778	
Kaverna na stacionaži 1+637 Vodena	1177	320	Biokovo	H03302		
Bezdanjača pod Vatinovcem	1176	201	Ličko sredogorje (Drvenjak)			
Gradišnica	1170	250	Gradiše	SI00086	578	
Pepelarica	1167	354	Velebit (Kalanjeva ruja)	HR00281		
Brejnice	1149	152	Menišija	SI00620	567	
Kmetov brezen	1149	41	Polhograjsko hribovje	SI01766	546	
Izvor Zagorske Mrežnice	1147		Ogulinsko-plaščanska udolina			
Bezdan konavoski	1123	142	Konavle			
Dobra nada	1112	300	Trnovski gozd	SI11518	1361	
Špilja Čude	1101*		Zrmanja watershed			
Žestoka pećina	1100	101	Njeguško polje		853	
Burja	1099	248	Matarsko podolje	SI10198	530	
Ponor pod Kremenom	1099	22	Korana watershed	HR02996		
Jelar ponor	1094	45	Ličko polje	HR02704		
Tamnica	1093*		Mrežnica watershed			
Medvedjak	1092	129	Matarsko podolje	SI00881	520	
Špilja u kamenolomu Debeljača	1082	67	Ličko sredogorje (Debeljača)	HR02488		
Kicljeve jame system	1075*	285	Velika Kapela (Kicelj)			
Jama Sirena	1075	401	Velebit (Rožanski kukovi)	HR00572		
Kojina jama	1070	179	Korana watershed	HR00143		
Račiške ponikve	1070	94	Brkini	SI04078	468	
Preporod	1065	230	Trnovski gozd	SI14000	1295	
Čardak	1054	175	Greben		1969	
Čendova jama	1040	126	Baška grapa	SI02903	582	
Močiljska špilja	1038	138	Neprobićka gora	HR00359		
Ponikve v Potokih	1036	152	Matarsko podolje	SI01690	488	
Piskovica	1036	38	Istria	HR01954		
Lekinka	1032	17	Postojnsko polje	SI01867	513	
Prekova jama	1028	100	Polhograjsko hribovje	SI11262	607	
Mitjina jama	1027	39	Matarsko podolje	SI08524	525	
Kamnešca	1023	147	Matarsko podolje	SI02967	525	
Majerovo Vrilo	1020	104/23	Gacko polje	HR02922		
Rokina bezdana	1016*	127	Mala Kapela (Panos)	HR01723		
Martinska jama pri Markovščini	1004	120	Matarsko podolje	SI02883	562	
Jama u Birbovoj dragi	1001	293	Ćićarija	HR02711		
Jaskinia Nyx	>1000	622	Maganik		1950	
Juriško vrelo	>1000	35	Bijelo polje		747	
Pećina Ponara/Plandište	986		Ribnica watershed		370	
Kovačevića pećina	985		Sokolska planina			
Pala skala system	984	667	Lovćen		1328	
Jages barlang	955	216	Lovćen		1320	
Brezno presenečenj	950	472	Dobrovlje	SI04500	993	
Potpećka pećina	931		Đetinja watershed			
Ponor u Klepinoj dulibi 2	915*	254	Velebit (Klepina duliba)			
Burinka	914	290	Crnopac	HR03327	880	
Jama pred Kotlom	900	404	Ćićarija	SI07163	690	
Stara škola	878	497	Biokovo		1550	
Jazben	868	334	Banjška planota	SI01024	580	
Majčevo brezno	853	153	Brkini	SI03576	475	
Grotta dei Liberi	849	402	Prokletije (Bjelič)		1910	
Vilenica	841	190	Kraški visoravan	SI00737	415	
Brezno treh src	763	621	Snežnik	SI09834	1260	
M13	765	333	Maganik			
Nove Hotiške ponikve	760	151	Matarsko podolje	SI11204	538	
Jamina	759		Veliki Rzav watershed			
Grotta dei Liberi	745	412	Prokletije (Bjelič)			
Jama pod Kamenitim vratima	722	499	Biokovo	HR01919	1350	
Nevidna voda	713	>713			~1200	
Pećina Ljubačevo	700		Ljubačka dolina			
Pećina Kuk	688		Bistrica watershed			
Drobovnik	673	2	Žumberačka gora	HR04037		
Crnopolis	664	252.5	Velebit (Crni Vrh)			
M73	646	473	Maganik			
Jama Olimp	643	537	Velebit (Begovački kuk)	HR00169	1389	
Zoran Jama	>630	>630	Maganik		1780	
Ledena jama u Lomskoj dulibi	629	536	Velebit (Lomska duliba)		1235	
Stupina jama	625	413	Ravno lič-poljsko	HR00278	924	
Baždarska pećina	617		Peštersko polje		1075	
Bunda jama	612	286	Durmitor		2028	
Pećina kod Golubovića	612		Glasinac (Gosinja)			
Łezka-Kolektor system	>602	263	Prokletije (Bjelič)		1011	
Patkov gušt	601	554	Velebit (Gornji kuk)	HR01456	1450	
Jaskinia Do Savino oko	588	256	Prokletije (Bjelič)		1998	
Brezno Bogumila Brinška	585	506	Snežnik	SI07299	1180	
Nova velika jama	582	361	Biokovo	HR01918		
Petnička pećina	580		Banja watershed			
Bizjakova jama	558	8	Žumberačka gora	SI07396	164	
Belojača	550	23	Bočko pogorje	SI02204	350	
Biokovka	545	389	Biokovo	HR03341		
Kamrica jama	534	351	Snežnik	SI05899	1223	
Pekel	529	137	Žumberačka gora	SI05059	665	
Crveno jezero	>528	>432	Imotsko polje			
Jelen brdo	518	192	Goteniška gora	SI09629	1101	
Šumeča polšna	516	166	Kočevski rog	SI09724	633	
Jama Paž	505	400	Velebit (Kita Gavranuša)	HR02444	1180	
Roupa	500	219	Banjška planota	SI01417	720	
Brezno lobanja	499	256	Snežnik	SI09999	1426	
Jaskinia Wrota Budvy	491	130			2104	
Klementina III	473*	333	Velebit (Kameni klanac)			
Jama Amfora	468*	778	Biokovo	HR02445	1590	
Jama frižider	462	225	Prokletije (Bjelič)		2020	
Kobiljak	460*	285	Istria	HR00995		
Sancinovo brezno	460	350	Tnovski gozd	SI15123	1050	
Ponor Vrulje	460	17	Žumberačka gora	HR01382		
Jama u Crkvenom dolu	453	>453	Moračka kapa			
Golokratna jama	450	175	Kraški visoravan	SI01947	365	
Gurdić	450	52	Kotorski zaljev		0	
Pretnerova jama	442*	254	Biokovo	HR02517		
Brezen na Vodicah	440	268	Banjška planota	SI01422	845	
Pećina Rastuša	440					
Pištet (PT4)	435	>435	Orjen (Kameno More)		725	
Ponor na Bunovcu	432*	534	Velebit (Bunovac)	HR02402		
Čukova jama	431	250	Kraški visoravan	SI01955	352	
Zečica	428	355	Biokovo	HR02181		
Hadži-Prodanova pećina	420		Čemerno		630	
Vaganska pećina	420		Vlašić		920	
Srednja Bijambarska pećina	420		Nišićka visoravan			
Divje jezero	415	160	Idrijca valley	SI05000	330	
Maričkin brezen	412	169	Banjška planota	SI11359	684	
Spila	410	72	Risan		20	
Jama na Kačju	406	264	Snežnik (Grobničko gorje)	HR03417		
Pečina v Radotah	402	168	Ćićarija	SI00649	588	
Jaskinia Pod Platem	402	45				
Jama Xantipa	400	323	Velebit (Vratarski kuk)	HR02225		
Sopot	400	70	Risan		29	
Žalcevo brezno	398	336	Snežnik	SI10011	1265	
Treći zvijet	397	310.1	Snežnik (Grobničko gorje)	HR04072		
Jaskinia Lodowego Smoka	396	183			1881	
Mokra pećina	395		Ravna Gora			
Ovčica	387	379	Velebit (Gromovača)	HR02873		
Gabranca	380	212	Narinsko polje	SI00958	414	
Strmadna	379	218	Nanos	SI02468	1044	
Osoletova jama	378	260	Zasavska gora	SI03467	650	
Brezno sijočih zvezd	377	270	Snežnik	SI11918	1225	
Cifre	375	280	Snežnik	SI05999	1316	
Mojčino brezno	375	209	Trnovski gozd	SI07181	1133	
Dragačevska/Rćanska pećina	370.5/556		Čemerno		405.2	
Balinka	360	288	Pišteničko gorje	HR01443	737	
Levakova jama	350	20	Žumberačka gora	SI00517	208	
Mejame	345	173	Kraški visoravan	SI00843	396	
Goteniško brezno	345	171	Goteniška gora	SI09571	806	
Jaskinia Kolacka Niżnia	344	40			2172	
Štirnica	335	205	Kočevski rog	SI09442	600	
Javornica kod Bizeka	330	28	Zagrebačka gora		306	
Ilasova jama	328*	56	Žumberačka gora	HR02783		
Jama Kraljica Krasa	320	57.4	Kraški visoravan		194	
Jaskinia Guzikowców	319	113			2018	
Jama v Dovčku	316	54	Žumberačka gora	SI11474	458	
Brezno 2 ob Ledeniški poti	310	183	Trnovski gozd	SI03889	1005	
Grom iz Vedra Neba	307	45			1930	
Grabrska jama	307	55	Žumberačka gora	SI04835	373	
Divja jama	304	266	Ćićarija	SI03668	830	
Ledenjačka pećina	302		Sarajevski Ozren			
Jama Michelangelo	300	274	Crnopac			
Zapadno od brda Drenjak	300	100	Glasinac (Gosinja)	RS00514	720	
Babatuša	>290	55	Trnovo polje		345/350	
Grozilda	290	200	Snežnik	SI11022	1423	
Briška jama	280	275	Kraški visoravan		275	
Gorjanc	262	226	Žumberačka gora	SI14957	754	
Megara	260		Skadar valley		283	
Medvedova jama	258	217	Trnovski gozd	SI04071	1040	
Marmornata	258	210	Kraški visoravan	SI10586	361	
03–116	258	123			2107	
Brezno pri tunelu	255	195	Brkini	SI07141	407	
Sutinščica	254	5.5	Ivanščica	HR03513		˙
Abisso dell'Ombra	>250	250	Prokletije (Bjelič)		1969	
Brezno na Levpah	250	250	Banjška planota	SI03905	670	
Veliko brezno v Sušjaku	250	229	Goteniška gora	SI03522	1065	
Brezno ob Korenovi poti	250	170	Trnovski gozd (Rogatec)	SI06430	685	
Voločka pećina	250	47	Skadar valley		6	
Benčna jama	248	172	Brkini	SI04417	459	
Brezno na Zgornji Lenčajski cesti	244	184	Snežnik	SI00937	1226	
Grda jama	240	191	Snežnik	SI02420	1395	
Jaskinia Stomaklija	240	91			2063	
Jaskinia Ziemia Obiecana	236	134			2101	
ZOB 3,5	234	151	Snežnik	SI10897	1385	
Pečenevka	230	98	Žumberačka gora	SI00851	453	
Suho brezno pri Mali Lazni	226	155	Trnovski gozd	SI00921	1077	
Luinovo brezno	225	175	Kraški visoravan	SI07124	265	
Veseli december	225	163	Trnovski gozd	SI10918	850	
Cinkov križ	222	185	Kočevski rog	SI03631	644	
Jama na Batici	218	160	Ćićarija	SI04796	864	
Pavlova pećina	217		Petrovo polje			
Jančerejska jama	214	214	Matarsko podolje	SI02703	545	
Brezno pri Oglenicah	214	214	Snežnik (Javorniki)	SI03197	975	
Brezno v Kislem žlebu	214	184	Snežnik	SI03693	1038	
Požiralnik v Klečah	212	63	Bočko pogorje	SI03379	420	
Lipiško brezno	210	210	Kraški visoravan	SI03169	375	
SRT 1	210	170	Kraški visoravan	SI06665	312	
Jama pod Škuljevim mlinom 1	203	25	Žumberačka gora	SI13132	340	
Lauf	200	185	Trnovski gozd (Praprot)	SI05314	1200	
Krevenica	>200	50	Skadar valley		37	
Vodičnik	192	185	Banjška planota	SI05210	855	
Novoletno brezno	190	163	Kočevski rog	SI08041	750	
Mihovska jama	190	54	Žumberačka gora	SI06484	426	
Pivnica	180	51	Ozaljsko pobrđe	HR01440	245	
Laznarjevo brezno	176	159	Trnovski gozd	SI04067	915	
Gabrovška pečina	175	39	Kraški visoravan		208	
Ljuta	170	133	Kotorski zaljev		20	
Đurđevačka jama	170	69	Đurđevac			
Brezno 4 ob Ledeniški poti	167	167	Trnovski gozd	SI03891	1023	
Risovača	167		Bukulja			
Kamenolomska jama	161	12	Žumberačka gora	HR00185		
Jaskinia Wpadka	160	56			1874	
Špilja Izvor pod pećinom	157	0	Žumberačka gora	HR03919		
Aladinova Pecina	156	16			1960	
Jama na Konjičih	153	153	Brkini	SI00139	445	
Velika mačka	152*	277	Biokovo	HR02189		
Jaskinia Nic Tu Nie Ma	147	23			1855	
Đot	146	42	Lipnik	HR01768	408	
Jaskinia Wrota Piekeł	145	101			2105	
Jamina žumberačka	143	30	Žumberačka gora	HR01338		
Jaskinia Przy Czerwonym	140	19			2054	
Jaskinia Widokowa	140	16			1961	
03–117	139	29			2088	
Pečina Pod kalom	137	33.5	Kraški visoravan		135	
Kičer	130	64	Žumberačka gora	SI05062	546	
Ribnička pećina	127		Ribnica watershed			
Kotarjeva prepadna	126	54	Žumberačka gora	SI00187	229	
Hrastovka	125	72	Žumberačka gora	SI09140	304	
Kranjča špilja	125	27	Kalnik	HR00209		
Jama pri Bosanski bajti	123	68	Žumberačka gora	SI02802	801	
Jama Šlapice	116*	282	Velebit (Japage)	HR00445		
Jaskinia Cedevita	112	45			1996	
Mikulićka	112	25	Žumberačka gora	HR01385		
Rakićka	111	11	Žumberačka gora	HR01383		
Škrinjica	110	15	Žumberačka gora	SI09294	285	
Krojačevka	103	70	Žumberačka gora	SI05597	520	
Jaskinia Setka	101	96			2003	
Négyszemű	100	64	Kranji do			
LK-5	100	55	Gornji Vršanj			
Tatinac 1	100	45	Gornji Vršanj			

* Horizontal length

== See also ==
- List of deepest Dinaric caves
- List of Dinaric caves
- List of caves

== Legend ==
Dry cave (Note: Rarely flooded.)	Partly wet cave (Note: At least one entrance dry but at least one passage with flowing water.)	Wet cave (Note: At least one entrance rarely dry.)	Submerged cave (Note: Rarely exposed.)	Cave with complex hydrological regime (Note: For example with seasonal variation.)
