= Jama u Birbovoj dragi =

Cave in Croatia

- Location within Croatia
- Interactive map of Jama u Birbovoj dragi
- Location: Račja Vas
- Coordinates: 45.43297°N 14.09579°E
- Depth: 293 metres (961 ft)
- Length: 1,001 metres (0.622 mi)
- Elevation: 729
- Discovery: 2002 (to science)
- Geology: Karst cave
- Entrances: 1
- Cadastral code: HR02711

Jama u Birbovoj dragi is a cave on Ćićarija with 1,001 metres (0.622 mi) of explored passage for a total depth of 293 metres (961 ft), although its unclimbed chimneys may come from more elevated entrances. Its entrance is on a karst polje locally known simply as "Valley" (Serbo-Croatian: Draga), but sometimes more precisely as Birbova Draga, which hosts several other pit caves. It is a mostly horizontal cave, with some deeper internal pits.

== Description ==
Jama u Birbovoj dragi is a complex cave. A map of the cave as explored in 2006 has been published.

It is one of the deepest caves in Istria, behind only the Zračak nade II - Kaverna u tunelu Učka system, Jama pred Kotlom, Jama Sežanske reke, Jama kod Rašpora, Jama 1 v Kanjaducah, Briška jama, Ponor Gotovž, and Davorjevo brezno, of which only 3 lie on the Učka-Ćićarija massif.

== History ==
The entrance was discovered in the spring of 2002 by speleologist Nenad Kuzmanović and Zoran Šverko, a villager of Prapoće, who had led speleologists to about a hundred objects and assisted in the uncovering of a number of buried entrances. The initial exploration period lasted from then until 2007, and no further expeditions have been undertaken since.

The several expeditions in 2002 reached a depth of around 70 metres (230 ft) and a length of about 200 metres (660 ft). When there was not enough time for horizontal exploration, the teams would climb its many chimneys and map side passages they had found. As there was no strong circulation of air and the cave seemed to be of typical morphology for Ćićarija, motivation was low.

At the beginning of 2003, exploration continued at a sharp meander some 293 metres (961 ft) from the entrance at a depth of around 80 metres (260 ft), where they had stopped the last time because the passage was jammed by fallen stone blocks. This time, they managed to pass through the blocks, then through speleothem-rich low passages that the explorers believed indicated the end of the cave. Instead, they encountered a 30 metres (98 ft) vertical. Two weeks later, they lowered themselves down a 40 metres (130 ft) vertical, then a series of shorter verticals, reaching a depth of around 180 metres (590 ft). Water flowed on through a narrow canyon, whose passage required explosive expansion. This part is now known as the Old Bottom (Serbo-Croatian: Staro dno)

From the discovery of the Old Bottom to the middle of 2004, the explorers entered the cave several times, but made no significant discoveries. The main reason for entering it at all was to finish the map. However, one of the cavers suspected a continuation of the cave in a chimney above the Old Bottom. In June, after climbing 10 metres (33 ft) up the chimney, such a continuation was found in the form of fossil canals, ending in a canyon so large they could not see either its floor or its ceiling.

Two further expeditions were undertaken that year, lasting 15 and 18 hours respectively, which passed a long chain of smaller verticals and meanders until the true bottom was reached at 240 metres (790 ft) below the entrance. This bottom is a 5×5 m chamber from which another meaner could once be reached, only to be covered in flowstone from above, almost completely plugging it. Water pools in a small lake in the floor, about 1 metre (3.3 ft) below a small hole through which passage is impossible. Some 30 metres (98 ft) above the true bottom, a fossil canal with a meander was found, but it was not yet explored in 2004 because they ran out of equipment. By the end of 2004, the cave was mapped to about 240 metres (790 ft) of depth and 650 metres (2,130 ft) of passage.

In January 2005, two intense expeditions of 20 and 22 hour durations were carried out. The fossil canal left unexplored in their last visit was explored to a length of 180 metres (590 ft), being about 1 metre (3.3 ft) in width and somewhat less than that in height. It is markedly drier, climbing mostly upward until the final 20 metres (66 ft) when it reaches a smaller vertical, at the bottom of which digging is needed for further passage, whose existence is indicated by a small air circulation. The cave was mapped to a length of 1,001 metres (3,284 ft).

From then until 2007, there were only rare visits to the cave, including the climbing of a chimney to a height of 45 metres (148 ft), the highest vertical in the cave. But for the most part, the cavers occupied themselves with the exploration of the nearby Jama kod Rašpora. The bottom was not visited after 2005 until 2007. In the spring of 2007, an hour of expansion at the true bottom led to one of the cavers almost reaching the other side of the 3 metres (9.8 ft) long narrows, but was in a head-first position and had to be pulled back out of the crack by his feet. It was determined that several more hours of widening would be needed for further passage. The final visit was also that spring, during which an attempt to climb to an opening not far from the bottom failed, so instead they climbed up a contributing passage at 210 metres (690 ft) depth.

Most participating cavers belonged the HSS section Spelunka, with Nenad Kuzmanović and Ivan Glavaš present in all 20 or so expeditions. (Note: The remaining participants: Ivana Bartolović, Martina Borovec, Zoran Brajković, Antonio Ciceran, Ana Čalić, Ozren Dodič, Nikola Gruborović, Igor Jellinich, Alen Kapidžić, Maja Kriška, Igor Markanjević, Matej Mirkac, Gorana Mišćenić, Dinko Novosel, Dalibor Reš, Rudi Reš, Marco Sticotti, Maja Sulić. A number of these participated in the measurements used by Glavaš to map the cave.)

From 2006 through 2008, it was visited by the Caving Sector of HPD Željezničar, who participated in its exploration. It is also one of the caves sometimes used in the new caver preparation Kastav Speleological School (Serbo-Croatian: Kastavska speleološka škola), held by Speleološka udruga "Estavela", for example in 2018.

== See also ==
- List of deepest Dinaric caves
- List of longest Dinaric caves

== Bibliography ==
- Državna geodetska uprava (1977). Hrvatska osnovna kartau mjerilu 1:5000 (Map). § Buzet: 5 C 19 - 29.
- Državna geodetska uprava (1997). Topografska karta 1:25 000 (TK25) (Map) (in Serbo-Croatian). § Rašpor (jug): 4514–2–1–1.
- Medica, Anton (2004). Račja Vas. Buzet, Račja Vas: Grafomarketing, Udruga za upravljanje zajedničkom imovinom sela Račja Vas. p. 263.
- Glavaš, Ivan (2004-12-20). "Jama u Birbovoj dragi". Subterranea Croatica (in Serbo-Croatian). 2 (3): 68. eISSN 2623-6648.
- Pavlek, Martina (2006). "Tajnički izvještaj SO HPD-a Željezničar za 2006. godinu". Speleolog (in Serbo-Croatian) (54): 69–72. eISSN 2623-7385.
- Glavaš, Ivan (2007-08-13). "Jama u Birbovoj dragi". Subterranea Croatica (in Serbo-Croatian). 5 (8): 8–10. eISSN 2623-6648.
- Pavlek, Martina (2007). "Tajnički izvještaj o radu SO HPD Željezničar u 2007. godini". Speleolog (in Serbo-Croatian) (55): 129–133. eISSN 2623-7385.
- Dadić, Josip (2008). "Tajnički izvještaj SO HPD-a "Željezničar" za 2008. godinu". Speleolog (in Serbo-Croatian) (56): 117–119. eISSN 2623-7385.
- Speleološka udruga "Spelunka" (2019). "Jama u Birbovoj dragi". Katastar speleoloških objekata Republike Hrvatske.
- Barišić, Aida (2024-11-27). "Najdublji speleološki objekti u Hrvatskoj: Speleološki objekti dublji od 250 metara" [Cro Deepest Caves: Caves with Total Depth of 250+ Meters]. Hrvatski planinarski savez (in Serbo-Croatian).
