= List of deepest Dinaric caves =

This is a list of the deepest caves in the Dinaric Alps. Slovenia, Croatia, and Serbia each had national lists of deepest caves in Yugoslav times, during which they were often compared. A continuously updated list is available for Slovenia. For Croatia, there is a periodically updated list of caves longer than 1 km and deeper than 250 m. The Katastar speleoloških objekata Republike Hrvatske remains closed to the public, but excerpts are available at Bioportal. The first list for Serbia was published in 1981, followed by an online list no longer updated after 2011.

This list is incomplete, missing caves shallower than 320 m (Montenegro), 250 m (Croatia), 150 m (Slovenia), 100 m (Serbia), and most deep caves in the remaining republics, although the coverage for Serbia could be improved from published lists.

Name	Depth	Length	Massif	Number	Elevation	Sources
Lukina jama - Trojama system	1431	3741	Velebit (Hajdučki kukovi)	HR01481	1475	
Nedam	1335	3399	Velebit (Hajdučki kukovi)		1430	
Slovačka jama	1324	6416	Velebit (Rožanski kukovi)	HR03265	1520	
Železna jama	1162	3360	Maganik		1767	
Velebita system	1026	3346	Velebit (Hajdučki kukovi)	HR02371	1557	
Jama Njemica	982	1935	Biokovo	HR02049		
Bela griža 1	884	2054	Trnovski gozd	SI07937	1198	
Velika ledena jama v Paradani	858	7311	Trnovski gozd	SI00742	1135	
Mokre noge	831	1563	Biokovo	HR03154		
Crnopac system	830	63746	Crnopac	HR03054, ...	1043, ...	
Jama Amfora	778	468*	Biokovo	HR02445	1590	
Jama na Vjetrenim brdima	775	1951	Durmitor (Žabljak)		2175	
Kétlyukú barlang	715	3600	Lovćen		1360	
Nevidna voda	713	>713			~1200	
Jama Meduza	706	1604	Velebit (Rožanski kukovi)		1595	
Pala skala system	667	984	Lovćen		1328	
Kozí Díra	662	1714	Orjen (Krivošije)		1011	
Zoran Jama	>630	>630	Maganik		1780	
Jaskinia Nyx	622	>1000	Maganik		1950	
Brezno treh src	621	763	Snežnik	SI09834	1260	
Jama u Malom Lomnom dolu	605	>1870	Durmitor (Žabljak)		2098	
A-1 - Vilimova jama system	589	1732	Biokovo			
Jaskinia Gornicza	585	2083	Prokletije (Bjelič)		2019	
Fliš	582	1672	Durmitor (Žabljak)		2080	
Patkov gušt	554	601	Velebit (Gornji kuk)	HR01456	1450	
Dol ledenica	543	1822	Trnovski gozd	SI09112	1130	
Jama Olimp	537	643	Velebit (Begovački kuk)	HR00169	1389	
Ledena jama u Lomskoj dulibi	536	629	Velebit (Lomska duliba)		1235	
Ponor na Bunovcu	534	432*	Velebit (Bunovac)	HR02402		
Lubuška jama	529	2395	Velebit (Hajdučki kukovi)	HR01466	1495	
Munižaba	510	10538	Crnopac	HR03251	915	
Duboki do	506	>2247	Njeguško polje		997	
Brezno Bogumila Brinška	506	585	Snežnik	SI07299	1180	
Opasna jama	>500	>2000	Žijovo		1355	
Jama pod Kamenitim vratima	499	722	Biokovo	HR01919	1350	
Stara škola	497	878	Biokovo		1550	
Fantomska jama	477	1218	Velebit (Visočica)	HR01668		
Habečkov brezen	476	1402	Trnovski gozd	SI00487	668	
Čaganka	475	2431	Kočevski rog	SI09500	690	
M73	473	646	Maganik			
Brezno presenečenj	472	950	Dobrovlje	SI04500	993	
Jamski sistem u Obručinama	464	>2680	Durmitor (Žabljak)		2135	
Jama u Crkvenom dolu	453	>453	Moračka kapa			
Jaskinia Lodowa	451	1956	Prokletije (Bjelič)		1945	
Pištet (PT4)	435	>435	Orjen (Kameno More)		725	
Crveno jezero	>432	>528	Imotsko polje			
Zračak nade II - Kaverna u tunelu Učka system	430	6596	Učka			
Stupina jama	413	625	Ravno lič-poljsko	HR00278	924	
Grotta dei Liberi	402	849	Prokletije (Bjelič)		1910	
Jama pred Kotlom	404	900	Ćićarija	SI07163	690	
Jama Sirena	401	1075	Velebit (Rožanski kukovi)	HR00572		
Zečja rupa	400	1700	Njeguško polje		1112	
Jama Paž	400	505	Velebit (Kita Gavranuša)	HR02444	1180	
Jama u Pribatovom dolu	395		Maganik		1720	
Jama Sežanske reke	394	1501	Kraški visoravan	SI10589	354	
Jama kod Rašpora	391	7361	Ćićarija	HR01883		
Biokovka	389	545	Biokovo	HR03341		
Jama u Majstorima	388		Lovćen		1195	
Njegoš pećina	383	6200	Njeguško polje		874	
Jeskyně Aither	380		Maganik		1920	
Ovčica	379	387	Velebit (Gromovača)	HR02873		
Ponor polne lune	370	1873	Banjška planota	SI07000	566	
Nova velika jama	361	582	Biokovo	HR01918		
Ferranova buža	358	3093	Ulovka	SI08085	657	
Zečica	355	428	Biokovo	HR02181		
Pepelarica	354	1167	Velebit (Kalanjeva ruja)	HR00281		
Kamrica jama	351	534	Snežnik	SI05899	1223	
Punar u Luci	350	1695	Pusto polje	HR02357	1075	
Sancinovo brezno	350	460	Trnovski gozd	SI15123	1050	
Jama Gnat	343	80*	Velebit (Kameni klanac)	HR01319		
Žalcevo brezno	336	398	Snežnik	SI10011	1265	
Jazben	334	868	Banjška planota	SI01024	580	
M13	333	765	Maganik			
Klementina III	333	473*	Velebit (Kameni klanac)			
Jama 1 v Kanjaducah	329	1332	Kraški visoravan	SI00276	352	
Podgračišće II	329		Brač			
Briška jama	275	280	Kraški visoravan		275	
Jama Xantipa	323	400	Velebit (Vratarski kuk)	HR02225		
Samo Lepo	321		Durmitor (Žabljak)		2160	
Kaverna na stacionaži 1+637 Vodena	320	1177	Biokovo	H03302		
Ponor Gotovž	320		Klanjsko polje		560	
Puhaljka	320		Velebit (Mijajičin kuk)			
Klementina IV	319		Velebit (Klementa)			
Jama Duša	318	2781	Crnopac	HR02340	975	
Propast Pema	318	>1500	Orjen		680	
Zaboravna jama	311	97*	Biokovo			
Treći zvijet	310.1	397	Snežnik (Grobničko gorje)	HR04072		
Davorjevo brezno	304	5887	Matarsko podolje	SI10060	508	
Dobra nada	300	1112	Trnovski gozd	SI11518	1361	
Todorova jama	297		Pivska planina		1660	
Jaskinia Gigant	296	1635	Prokletije (Bjelič)		2116	
Jama u Birbovoj dragi	293	1001	Ćićarija	HR02711		
Burinka	290	914	Crnopac	HR03327	880	
Balinka	288	360	Pišteničko gorje	HR01443	737	
Lokvarka	286	1179*	Lokvarsko polje		778	
Bunda jama	286	612	Durmitor		2028	
Kicljeve jame system	285	1075*	Velika Kapela (Kicelj)			
Kobiljak	285	460*	Istria	HR00995		
Maglena jama	>282		Orjen		1120	
Jama Šlapice	282	116*	Velebit (Japage)	HR00445		
Kačna jama	280	20200	Kraški visoravan	SI00955	435	
Cifre	280	375	Snežnik	SI05999	1316	
Jama Bogoš	279	2000	Gornji Vršanj			
Velika mačka	277	152*	Biokovo	HR02189		
Jama Michelangelo	274	300	Crnopac			
Brezno sijočih zvezd	270	377	Snežnik	SI11918	1225	
Klementina I	269	2403*	Velebit (Klementa)			
Ponor Bregi	269	2110*	Istria			
Brezen na Vodicah	268	440	Banjška planota	SI01422	845	
Divja jama	266	304	Ćićarija	SI03668	830	
Jama na Kačju	264	406	Snežnik (Grobničko gorje)	HR03417		
Łezka-Kolektor system	263	>602	Prokletije (Bjelič)		1011	
Jama Jame hame	263	74	Snežnik (Grobničko gorje)			
Osoletova jama	260	378	Zasavska gora	SI03467	650	
Jama kod Matešić stana	260		Brač			
Jaskinia Do Savino oko	256	588	Prokletije (Bjelič)		1998	
Brezno lobanja	256	499	Snežnik	SI09999	1426	
Škocjanske jame	254	6138	Kraški visoravan	SI00735	271	
Ponor u Klepinoj dulibi 2	254	915*	Velebit (Klepina duliba)			
Tu fifti	254		Velebit (Šugarska duliba)			
Pretnerova jama	254	442*	Biokovo	HR02517		
Crnopolis	252.5	664	Velebit (Crni Vrh)			
Gradišnica	250	1170	Gradiše	SI00086	578	
Lipiška jama	250	1400	Kraški visoravan	SI00311	395	
Čukova jama	250	431	Kraški visoravan	SI01955	352	
Brezno na Levpah	250	250	Banjška planota	SI03905	670	
Jama Marianna	250		Velebit (Rožanski kukovi)			
Abisso dell'Ombra	250	>250	Prokletije (Bjelič)		1969	
Burja	248	1099	Matarsko podolje	SI10198	530	
Niby Czarna-Babina sisa system	236	1611	Prokletije (Bjelič)		1885	
Preporod	230	1065	Trnovski gozd	SI14000	1295	
Vilina špilja - Izvor Omble	229	3050*	Ombla watershed	HR02919		
Veliko brezno v Sušjaku	229	250	Goteniška gora	SI03522	1065	
Gorjanc	226	262	Žumberačka gora	SI14957	754	
Jama frižider	225	462	Prokletije (Bjelič)		2020	
Roupa	219	500	Banjška planota	SI01417	720	
Strmadna	218	379	Nanos	SI02468	1044	
Medvedova jama	217	258	Trnovski gozd	SI04071	1040	
Jages barlang	216	955	Lovćen		1320	
Jančerejska jama	214	214	Matarsko podolje	SI02703	545	
Brezno pri Oglenicah	214	214	Snežnik (Javorniki)	SI03197	975	
Gabranca	212	380	Narinsko polje	SI00958	414	
Lipiško brezno	210	210	Kraški visoravan	SI03169	375	
Marmornata	210	258	Kraški visoravan	SI10586	361	
Mojčino brezno	209	375	Trnovski gozd	SI07181	1133	
Štirnica	205	335	Kočevski rog	SI09442	600	
Gornja Cerovačka špilja	202/192	4036	Crnopac			
Začirska pećina	201	2180	Ceklinsko polje		445	
Bezdanjača pod Vatinovcem	201	1176	Ličko sredogorje (Drvenjak)			
Grozilda	200	290	Snežnik	SI11022	1423	
Dragov ponor	200		Povlen			
Brezno pri tunelu	195	255	Brkini	SI07141	407	
Jelen brdo	192	518	Goteniška gora	SI09629	1101	
Grda jama	191	240	Snežnik	SI02420	1395	
Vilenica	190	841	Kraški visoravan	SI00737	415	
Cinkov križ	185	222	Kočevski rog	SI03631	644	
Lauf	185	200	Trnovski gozd (Praprot)	SI05314	1200	
Vodičnik	185	192	Banjška planota	SI05210	855	
Brezno v Kislem žlebu	184	214	Snežnik	SI03693	1038	
Brezno na Zgornji Lenčajski cesti	184	244	Snežnik	SI00937	1226	
Jaskinia Lodowego Smoka	183	396			1881	
Brezno 2 ob Ledeniški poti	183	310	Trnovski gozd	SI03889	1005	
Hotiške ponikve	180	2644	Matarsko podolje	SI01173	536	
Kojina jama	179	1070	Korana watershed	HR00143		
Lenčkova jama	177	1730	Nanos	SI001012	634	
Ponor Vinicio Potleca	176	1708	Istria	HR02472		
Čardak	175	1054	Greben		1969	
Golokratna jama	175	450	Kraški visoravan	SI01947	365	
Luinovo brezno	175	225	Kraški visoravan	SI07124	265	
Mejame	173	345	Kraški visoravan	SI00843	396	
Benčna jama	172	248	Brkini	SI04417	459	
Goteniško brezno	171	345	Goteniška gora	SI09571	806	
Brezno ob Korenovi poti	170	250	Trnovski gozd (Rogatec)	SI06430	685	
SRT 1	170	210	Kraški visoravan	SI06665	312	
Maričkin brezen	169	412	Banjška planota	SI11359	684	
Predjama cave system	168	19561	Hrušica	SI00734	491	
Pečina v Radotah	168	402	Ćićarija	SI00649	588	
Brezno 4 ob Ledeniški poti	167	167	Trnovski gozd	SI03891	1023	
Šumeča polšna	166	516	Kočevski rog	SI09724	633	
Novokrajska jama	164	1180	Brkini	SI00810	470	
Veseli december	163	225	Trnovski gozd	SI10918	850	
Novoletno brezno	163	190	Kočevski rog	SI08041	750	
Zelške jame	160	7338	Rakov Škocjan	SI00576	506	
Divje jezero	160	415	Idrijca valley	SI05000	330	
Jazbina v Rovnjah	160	2233	Matarsko podolje	SI06280	484	
Jama na Batici	160	218	Ćićarija	SI04796	864	
Laznarjevo brezno	159	176	Trnovski gozd	SI04067	915	
Gospodska špilja - Glavaš system	157	4982	Cetina watershed	HR03246		
Dolača	155	1262	Žumberačka gora	HR00591		
Suho brezno pri Mali Lazni	155	226	Trnovski gozd	SI00921	1077	
Jama na Konjičih	153	153	Brkini	SI00139	445	
Majčevo brezno	153	853	Brkini	SI03576	475	
Brejnice	152	1149	Menišija	SI00620	567	
Ponikve v Potokih2	152	1036	Matarsko podolje	SI01690	488	
Prepadna jama	151	1557	Gotenica-Reka plateau	SI02566	514	
ZOB 3,5	151	234	Snežnik	SI10897	1385	
Nove Hotiške ponikve	151	760	Matarsko podolje	SI11204	538	
Ocizeljska jama	150	2780	Dolina Glinščice	SI01003	349	
Kamnešca	147	1023	Matarsko podolje	SI02967	525	
Bezdan konavoski	142	1123	Konavle			
Močiljska špilja	138	1038	Neprobićka gora	HR00359		
Pekel	137	529	Žumberačka gora	SI05059	665	
Dimnice	134	6020	Matarsko podolje	SI00736	565	
Jaskinia Ziemia Obiecana	134	236			2101	
Ljuta	133	170	Kotorski zaljev		20	
Jaskinia Wrota Budvy	130	491			2104	
Medvedjak	129	1092	Matarsko podolje	SI00881	520	
Čendova jama	126	1040	Baška grapa	SI02903	582	
Rokina bezdana	127	1016*	Mala Kapela (Panos)	HR01723		
Jama Ebenthal	125	2327	Polomsko podolje	SI06842	380	
Tounjčica system	124/46	9104	Krpel	HR00692		
Lenčina jama	124		Povlen			
03–116	123	258			2107	
Najdena jama	121	5216	Menišija	SI00259	517	
Logarček	120	4888	Menišija	SI00028	498	
Grotta del Vento	120	4500	Dolina Glinščice		650	
Martinska jama pri Markovščini	120	1004	Matarsko podolje	SI02883	562	
Javorniška jama	119	1456	Cerkniško polje	SI10357	636	
Ponor Kolinasi	119	1278	Ćićarija	HR03751		
Ponor Vele vode	118	1495*	Snežnik (Grobničko gorje)	HR00549		
Bedara	113	1593	Žumberak			
Jaskinia Guzikowców	113	319			2018	
Ponor kod Čekove kuće	112		Tara			
Vranjedolska jama	111	1476	Cerkniško polje	SI15400	643	
Pucov brezen	110	2235	Polhograjsko hribovje	SI01777	633	
Žirovcova jama	106	5994	Polhograjsko hribovje	SI10000	621	
Majerovo Vrilo	104/23	1020	Gacko polje	HR02922		
Gašpinova jama	103	3375	Logateško polje	SI08000	483	
Jama na Javoru	103	2060	Crnopac			
Žestoka pećina	101	1100	Njeguško polje		853	
Jaskinia Wrota Piekeł	101	145			2105	
Pejca v Lascu	101		Kraški visoravan		114	
Prekova jama	100	1028	Polhograjsko hribovje	SI11262	607	
Zapadno od brda Drenjak	100	300	Glasinac (Gosinja)	RS00514	720	
Pečenevka	98	230	Žumberačka gora	SI00851	453	
Donja Cerovačka špilja	97/68	4207	Crnopac			
Mandelaja	96	2835	Krpel	HR01728		
Jaskinia Setka	96	101			2003	
Revenov brezen	95	1236	Polhograjsko hribovje	SI00623	621	
Račiške ponikve	94	1070	Brkini	SI04078	468	
Jaskinia Stomaklija	91	240			2063	
Savino oko	90		Ropojana		1000	
Dihalnik v Grdem dolu	89	1415	Slivnica	SI06286	656	
Grbočica	87	2650	Svinštik		390	
Markov ponor	84/69	2240	Kosinjsko polje	HR01480		
Dragića pećina II	78	1625*	Cetina watershed	HR00838		
Straško brezno	78	78	Žumberačka gora	SI04372	249	
Velka Vrulja	76	1554	Velebit (Paklenica)			
Vodna jama v Lozi	75	7748	Ravnik	SI00911	560	
Golubnjača u Grulovićima	73	2189	Bukovica	HR00250		
Hrastovka	72	125	Žumberačka gora	SI09140	304	
Spila	72	410	Risan		20	
Jama Ledana	72	180	Bobija			
Tkalca jama	71	2885	Rakov Škocjan	SI00857	492	
Sopot	70	400	Risan		29	
Krojačevka	70	103	Žumberačka gora	SI05597	520	
Obrh Čolniči	69	2762	Loško pogorje	SI00006	423	
Jama pri Bosanski bajti	68	123	Žumberačka gora	SI02802	801	
Miljacka I i V	68/57	2707	Krka watershed			
Ledena pećina (Montenegro)	68		Durmitor		2150	
Špilja u kamenolomu Debeljača	67	1082	Ličko sredogorje (Debeljača)	HR02488		
Planinska jama	65	6859	Planinsko polje	SI00748	453	
Ušački pećinski sistem	65	6185	Peštersko polje		1020, 980, 955	
Hajdova hiža	65	1188*	Kupa watershed	HR01835		
Vipavska jama	64	1932	Vipavska dolina	SI01752	98	
Kičer	64	130	Žumberačka gora	SI05062	546	
Négyszemű	64	100	Kranji do			
Ponikve v Jezerini	63	1321	Matarsko podolje	SI04584	489	
Požiralnik v Klečah	63	212	Bočko pogorje	SI03379	420	
Zvonečka II	61	81	Lipnik	HR01770	365	
Dolnja jama v Trlicah	61	63	Žumberačka gora	SI03269	693	
Podstenska jama	60	3376	Ribniška dolina	SI03882	556	
Viršnica	60	2796	Ilova gora	SI00571	339	
Vukelića pećina	60	1437	Ličko polje	HR00551		
Đurđevačka jama	69	170	Đurđevac			
Jama Atila	59/42	2410	Velebit (Pazarište)	HR02466		
Sveti Križ	58	25*	Ozaljsko pobrđe		338	
Jama Kraljica Krasa	57.4	320	Kraški visoravan		194	
Jopićeva špilja - Bent system	57	6710*	Korana watershed	HR02370		
Cetinjska pećina	57	1680	Cetinjsko polje		668	
Jama	56	1244	Maganik		350	
Ilasova jama	56	328*	Žumberačka gora	HR02783		
Jaskinia Wpadka	56	160			1874	
Jazovka	56	42*	Žumberačka gora			
Provala	55	2161	Žumberačka gora	HR00758		
Grabrska jama	55	307	Žumberačka gora	SI04835	373	
Babatuša	55	>290	Trnovo polje		345/350	
LK-5	55	100	Gornji Vršanj			
Osapska jama	54	1607	Osapska dolina	SI01154	106	
Jama v Dovčku	54	316	Žumberačka gora	SI11474	458	
Mihovska jama	54	190	Žumberačka gora	SI06484	426	
Kotarjeva prepadna	54	126	Žumberačka gora	SI00187	229	
Suhadolca	53	1690	Cerkniško polje	SI00280	550	
Jama Himalaja	52	97	Žumberačka gora	SI13529	226	
Jama na Škrilama	54	32*	Lipnik	HR01766	413	
Radoška jama	54		Žumberačka gora	SI01357	503	
Babina jama	52.3	1672*	Ličko polje			
Gurdić	52	450	Kotorski zaljev		0	
Palovica	52	20*	Žumberačka gora	HR00719		
Pivnica	51	180	Ozaljsko pobrđe	HR01440	245	
Veternica	50 (Note: Vertical difference 175 or >200)	7128	Zagrebačka gora	HR00118	306	
Miljacka II	50/29	3365	Krka watershed			
Krevenica	50	>200	Skadar valley		37	
Kadiševa jama	50	50	Žumberačka gora	SI00854	390	

* Horizontal length

== See also ==
- List of Dinaric caves
- List of longest Dinaric caves
- List of caves

== Legend ==
Dry cave (Note: Rarely flooded.)	Partly wet cave (Note: At least one entrance dry but at least one passage with flowing water.)	Wet cave (Note: At least one entrance rarely dry.)	Submerged cave (Note: Rarely exposed.)	Cave with complex hydrological regime (Note: For example with seasonal variation.)
