= Hadži-Prodan's Cave =

Cave and archaeological site in Serbia

- Хаџи-Проданова пећина (Serbian)
- Hadži Prodanova
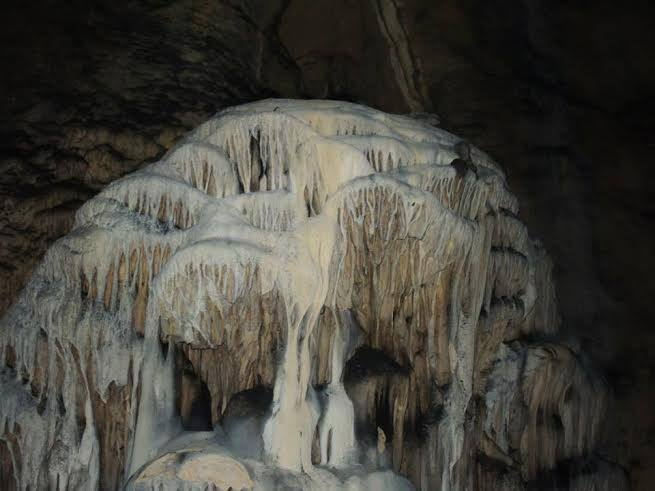
- Hadži-Prodan's Cave

- location in Serbia
- 43°38′0.6″N 20°14′32.3″E
- Periods: Palaeolithic
- Associated with: Homo neanderthalensis, Homo sapiens
- Location: Raščići village, near Ivanjica
- Region: western central Serbia,

The Hadži-Prodan's Cave (Serbian: Хаџи-Проданова пећина, Hadži-Prodanova pećina) is an archaeological site of the Paleolithic period and a national natural monument, located in the village Raščići around 7 km (4.3 mi) from Ivanjica in western central Serbia. The rather narrow and high entrance with at an altitude of 630 m (2,070 ft) above sea level sits about 40 m (130 ft) above the Rašćanska river valley bed and is oriented towards the south. The 345 m (1,132 ft) long cave was formed during the Late Cretaceous in "thick-bedded to massive" Senonian limestone. Prehistoric pottery shards and Pleistocene faunal fossils had already been collected by Zoran Vučićević from Ivanjica. Animal fossils especially Cave bear (Ursus spelaeus) and Iron Age artifact discoveries during an unrelated areal survey were reportedly made at the cave entrance and in the main cavern. The site is named in honor of Hadži-Prodan, a 19th-century Serbian revolutionary.

== Excavations ==
Hadži Prodanova has been the subject of research and study in speleological and archaeological literature for over a century. It received renewed attention after a 2003 to 2004 joint excavation campaign of the University of Belgrade, the National Museum of Serbia and the Institute for Protection of Cultural Heritage in Kraljevo. It was decided to thoroughly review and document the site as material and objects of Palaeolithic origin and fossilized bones of Pleistocene fauna were unearthed during previous survey excavations. Probes had been taken to identify the foundations and map the original position of an early 20th century Church (St. Archangel Michael) that once stood right in front of the cave's entrance in order to accurately assess the feasibility of its reconstruction. In 2003 a 2.5 m (8.2 ft) deep trench of 16 m^{2} (170 sq ft) was dug in the entrance, the main cavern and the internal part of the cave plateau. Only fifteen Palaeolithic artifacts were discovered inside the cave. Most discoveries originate from the frontal plateau. The aim of the excavation was to evaluate the stratigraphic position of the findings. Hadži Prodanova has yielded sizable faunal deposits of various large and small vertebrates. Five sediment layers were investigated and the remains of cave bears, wolves, ibex, various rodents and birds unearthed. In total, 13 species of rodents have been found, which are still extant. Composition and frequency helped to better determine the ecological characteristics of the stratigraphic segments.

=== Analysis ===
In a 2010 preliminary taphonomic analysis it was concluded, that "human occupation was very brief, maybe only a few hours, which is somewhat more common in the Middle Paleolithic than in the Epigravettian". However, Hadži Prodanova and the nearby Šalitrena Cave are so far the only cave sites in the Central Balkan mountains, that have produced evidence for human presence in a Gravettian and/or Epigravettian cultural context. Dušan Mihailović argues in "Palaeolithic and Mesolithic research in the Central Balkans" that Gravettian communities populated South-eastern Europe around 26,000 years ago - the beginning of the Last Glacial Maximum, avoided mountainous habitats and preferably retreated to shelters near the coast and the southern Balkans.

== Stratigraphy ==
The interior sediments are around 2.5 m (8.2 ft) high and constitute a stratigraphic sequence of five cultural layers.

1. Holocene era top layer of grey clay mixed with fragmented rocks, which contained Iron Age and more recent artifacts.
2. Late Upper Palaeolithic strata of brown and yellowish clay mixed with fine debris, that held flakes and chipped flint artifacts attributed to the Epigravettian culture, implements with abruptly retouched edges point to a deposition of Gravettian or Epigravettian cultural settlement.
3. Archaeologically sterile layer of brown clay with coarse detritus, large rocks and no artifacts.
4. Middle Palaeolithic strata of light brown clay with fine detritus and variously sized deposits of fine gravel, that contained artifacts. The ecological characteristics of layer 4 and 5 are similar.
5. Middle Palaeolithic strata of dark brown clay with coarse detritus and large rocks, that yielded two scraper tools and several artifacts made of quartzite. This layer was further divided into four horizons (a, b, c and d).
- The cave entrance's sediment structure extends out onto the relatively flat exterior area of some 80 m^{2} (860 sq ft), where excavations to a depth of 4.4 m (14 ft) has not yet reached the bedrock.

Hadzi Prodanova has been put under national protection in 1974 and its protection status was reviewed and approved in 2005.

== See also ==
- List of longest Dinaric caves
