= Lanišće =

Lanišće Lanischie
- Municipality
- Lanišće Municipality
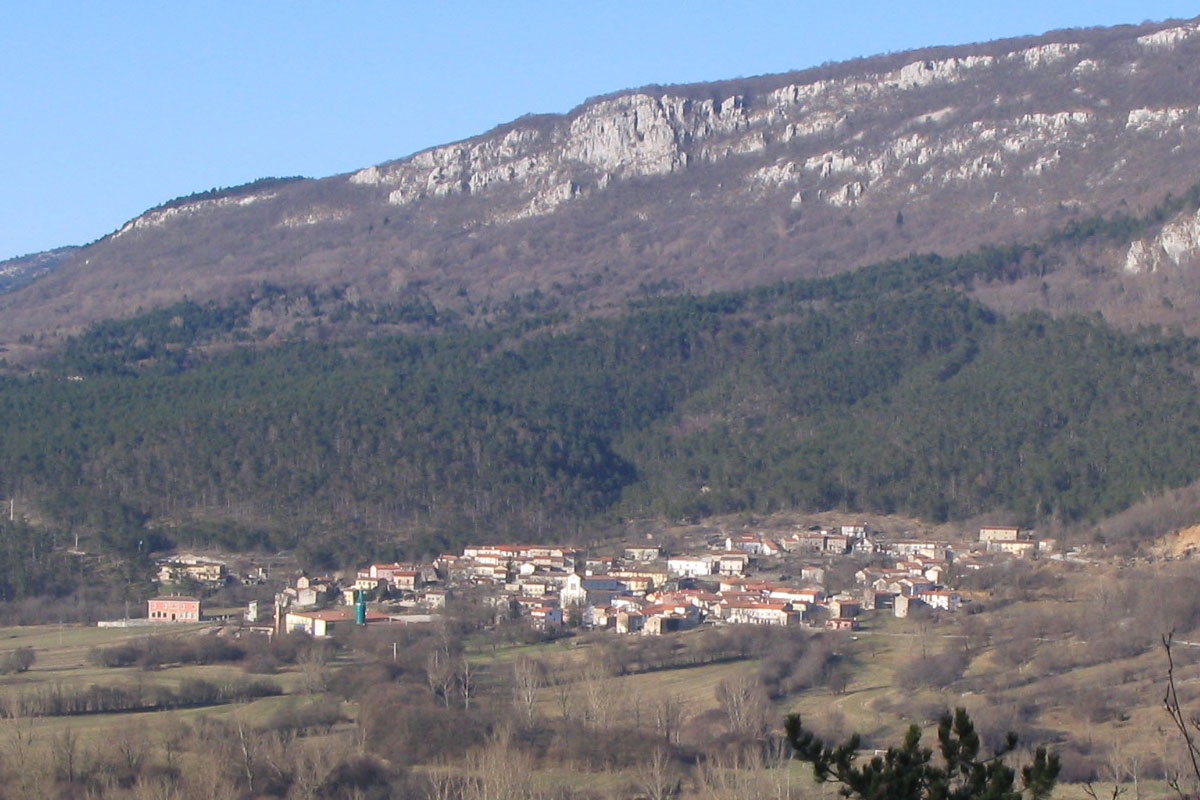

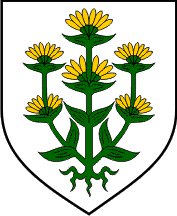
- Coat of arms

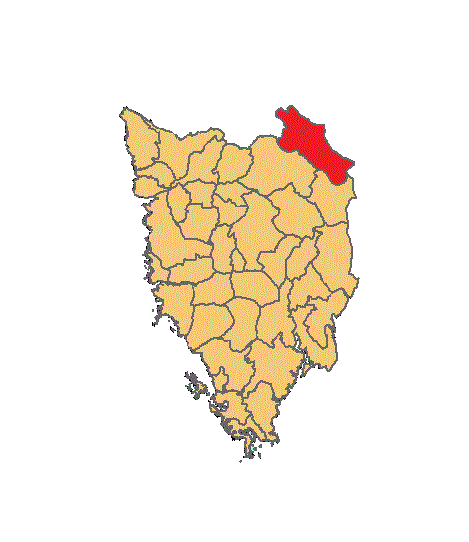
- Location of Lanišće municipality in Istria
- Interactive map of Lanišće
- Location within Croatia
- Coordinates: 45°24′28″N 14°6′56″E
- Country: Croatia
- County: Istria County

Government
  - Mayor: Roberta Medica

Area
  - Municipality: 143.7 km^{2} (55.5 sq mi)
  - Urban: 15.2 km^{2} (5.9 sq mi)
- Elevation: 546 m (1,791 ft)

Population (2021)
  - Municipality: 268
  - Density: 1.86/km^{2} (4.83/sq mi)
  - Urban: 68
  - Urban density: 4.5/km^{2} (12/sq mi)
- Time zone: UTC+1 (CET)
  - Summer (DST): UTC+2 (CEST)
- Postal code: 52420 Buzet
- Website: opcinalanisce.com

Lanišće (Italian: Lanischie) is a village and municipality in the mountainous Ćićarija area, Istria, Croatia. In 2011, the population of the village itself was 88, with a total of 329 residents in the municipality. Over 92.40% of the population are Croats. There are fourteen settlements in the municipality: Brest, Brgudac, Dane, Jelovice, Klenovšćak, Kropinjak, Lanišće, Podgaće, Prapoće, Račja Vas, Rašpor, Slum, Trstenik and Vodice.

== Description ==
Municipality Lanišće was formed in 1992, with total area as the largest municipality in the Istria County, while by population density the smallest.

There are also two hamlets, Brljavci and Črnehi, which are according to the statistical data attributed to the village Kropinjak. Almost all villages are mentioned since the 13th-14th century, and all villages are of mountainous character, located at altitudes from 500 m (Podgaće) to 740 m (Brgudac) above sea level.

== Demographics ==
According to the 2021 census, its population was 268, with 68 living in the village proper. The municipality consists of the following settlements:

- Brest, population 31
- Brgudac, population 15
- Dane, population 6
- Jelovice, population 10
- Klenovšćak, population 8
- Kropinjak, population 0
- Lanišće, population 68
- Podgaće, population 44
- Prapoće, population 31
- Račja Vas, population 21
- Rašpor, population 2
- Slum, population 23
- Trstenik, population 0
- Vodice, population 9
Lanišće: Population trends 1857–2021
v

population	3820	4109	4264	4555	4870	4756	2811	4151	3235	2698	1715	927	624	621	398	329	268
	1857	1869	1880	1890	1900	1910	1921	1931	1948	1953	1961	1971	1981	1991	2001	2011	2021

Sources: Croatian Bureau of Statistics publications

Until 1900 and 1910, population has grown steadily, and the largest density was in 1900 with 33,8/km2. Until 1900, Vodice was the largest village in municipality, and after 1910 remained the second after Lanišće. Both villages until 1910 with population outnumbered Buzet. Many families and individuals in the period from the late 1800s until 1941 emigrated, mostly to countries in North and South America. The first stagnation was at the time of World War I, between 1910 and 1921, but it was followed by sudden increase until 1931 and 1936. The second and permanent period of stagnation followed after World War II (1945-1948). According to the 2011 census, municipality of Lanišće had 329 residents.

=== Municipality ===
Population number according census
1857	1869	1880	1890	1900	1910	1921	1931	1948	1953	1961	1971	1981	1991	2001	2011
3,820	4,109	4,264	4,555	4,870	4,756	2,811	4,151	3,235	2,698	1,715	927	624	621	398	329

Note: Emerged from old Buzet municipality. In 1921 part of data is contained in Buzet.

=== Village ===
Population number according census
1857	1869	1880	1890	1900	1910	1921	1931	1948	1953	1961	1971	1981	1991	2001	2011
460	499	571	576	640	650	0	1,979	518	489	288	167	115	181	94	88

Note: In 1921 part of data is contained in Roč (near Buzet). In 1931 contains data from villages Brgudac, Podgaće, Prapoće, Račja Vas and Rašpor.

== See also ==
- Ćići
