= JAT Flight 769 =

1973 aviation accident in Yugoslavia

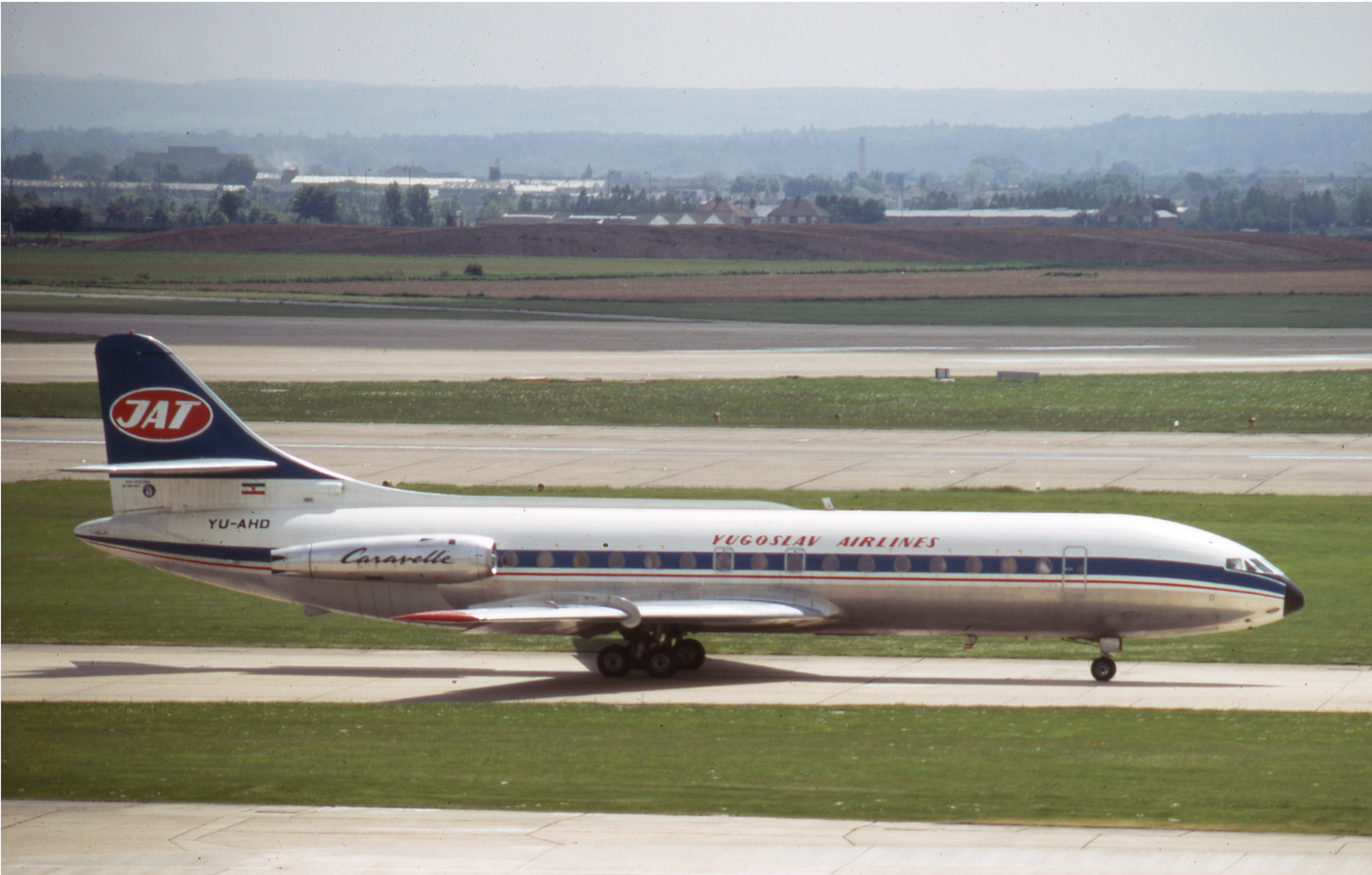
- YU-AHD, the aircraft involved in the accident

Accident
- Date: 11 September 1973
- Summary: Control tower error, radar malfunction, CFIT
- Site: Mount Maganik, SR Montenegro, SFR Yugoslavia; 42°51′44″N 19°22′50″E

Aircraft
- Aircraft type: Sud Aviation SE-210 Caravelle VI-N
- Operator: JAT Yugoslav Airlines
- IATA flight No.: JU769
- ICAO flight No.: JAT769
- Call sign: JAT 769
- Registration: YU-AHD
- Flight origin: Skopje International Airport, Skopje, SR Macedonia, SFR Yugoslavia
- Destination: Titograd Airport, Titograd, SR Montenegro, SFR Yugoslavia
- Occupants: 41
- Passengers: 35
- Crew: 6
- Fatalities: 41
- Survivors: 0

On 11 September 1973, JAT Flight 769, carried out by a Sud Aviation SE-210 Caravelle VI-N (Registration: YU-AHD), was nearing its end completing a scheduled domestic flight from Skopje, SR Macedonia to Titograd (modern-day Podgorica), SR Montenegro when it crashed into Mount Maganik, in central Montenegro, killing all 41 passengers and crew. The aircraft was written off.

== Accident ==
The flight, a scheduled domestic Flight JU 769 from Skopje to Titograd, was nearing its end. Allegedly, the flight was instructed to start descent, although the aircraft was not visible on radar (which were allegedly not working well at the time) nor could the control tower staff make visual contact with the aircraft. At the time of the flight, there were no qualified staff at the control tower in Titograd. The flight was asked to descend to a flight level of 6,000 feet (1,800 m) or a height it saw fit. The aircraft crashed into the peak of Medvjeđi vrh (2140 m, 7021 ft) on Maganik mountain near Kolašin. All 41 people on board died in the accident. The crash is, to date, the deadliest accident in Montenegro.

== See also ==
West Coast Airlines Flight 956

- List of accidents and incidents involving airliners by airline

== Sources ==
- Dnevnik Online
- View of Babin zub (Grandmother's tooth) peak
- Maganik mountain
- Memorial plate of JAT's aeroplane crash in 1973
