= Orlovača Cave =

Cave in Bosnia and Herzegovina

Orlovača
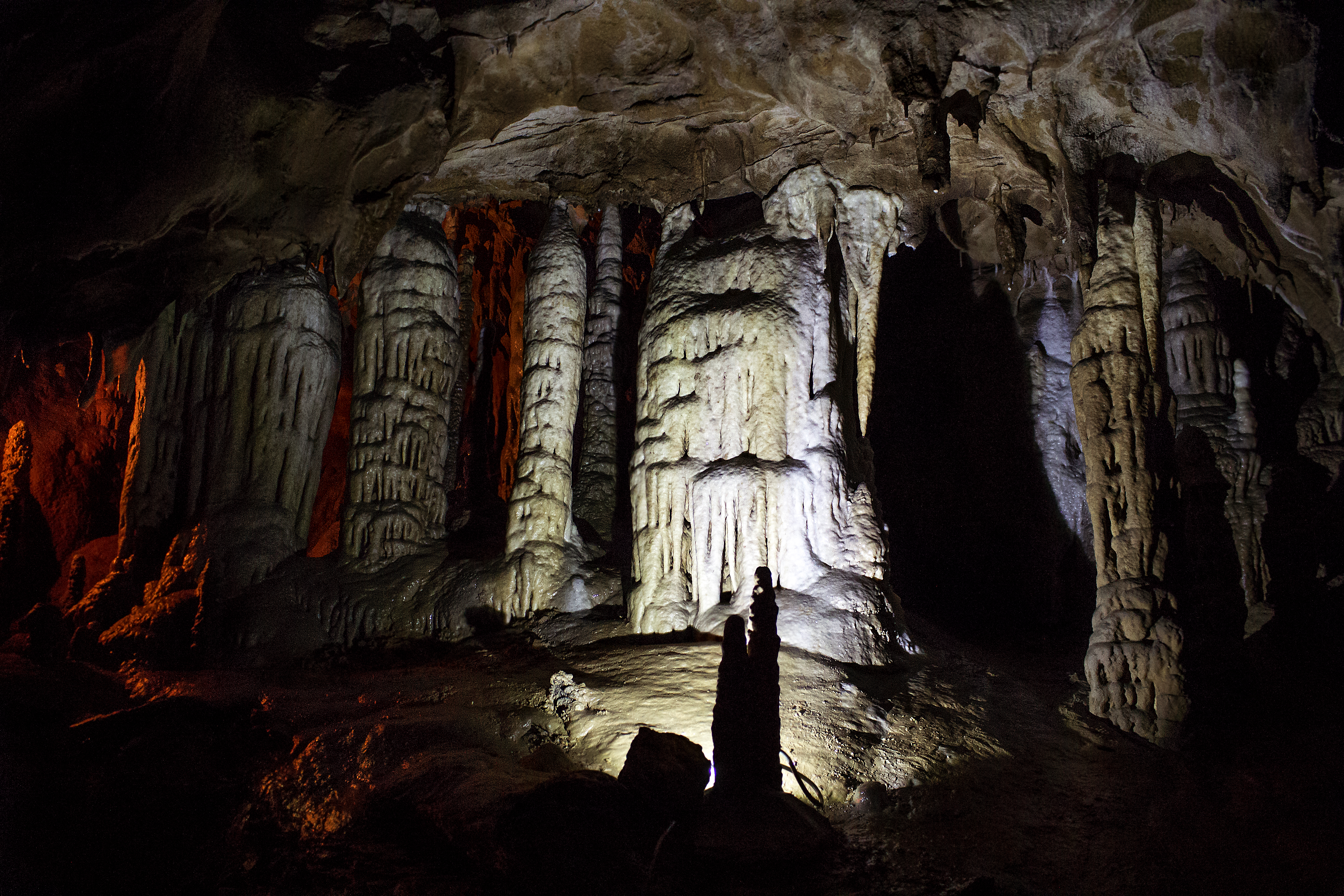

- Location within Bosnia and Herzegovina
- Coordinates: 43°53′00″N 18°35′03″E
- Elevation: 1,056 metres (3,465 ft) a.s.l.

Orlovača Cave is the second-longest cave in Bosnia and Herzegovina, and the longest cave in the entity of Republica Srpska. It is situated at Orlovača Hill, 10 kilometres (6.2 mi) west from Pale and 15 kilometres (9.3 mi) east from Sarajevo. It is known by local people as Sava’s cave.

The first exploratory expedition entered the cave in 1975, and since then about 2,500 metres (8,200 ft) have been explored. One of the cave expeditions found bones of a cave bear whose age is estimated at 16,000 years old. In their vicinity, remains of ax and ceramic fragments from prehistoric times were found.

The cave is characterized by its stable microclimate; during the whole year, the temperature is only 8.8 °C (47.8 °F) and humidity is over 90%.

This cave is under the protection of the Institute for the Protection of the Republic Institute for the Protection of Cultural, Historical and Natural Heritage of the Republic of Srpska, and it is selected as I category of protection. Orlovača cave is open for tourist visits.

== See also ==
- List of longest Dinaric caves
