= Brežđe =

- Village (Selo)
- Location within Serbia
- Country: Serbia
- District: Kolubara
- Municipality: Mionica

Population (2011)
  - Total: 468
- Time zone: UTC+1 (CET)
  - Summer (DST): UTC+2 (CEST)

Historical population
Year	Pop.	±%
1948	953	—
1953	1,013	+6.3%
1961	969	−4.3%
1971	874	−9.8%
1981	806	−7.8%
1991	624	−22.6%
2002	572	−8.3%
2011	468	−18.2%

Brežđe (Serbian: Брежђе) is a village in the Mionica municipality, Kolubara District in Serbia.

== Šalitrena Cave ==
Šalitrena Cave (Serbian: Шалитрена пећина, romanized: Šalitrena pećina) is located in the village area, in the gorge of the Ribnica river. The name means "Saltpeter Cave" in Serbian.

It is the richest Paleolithic find of the central and west Balkan Peninsula, a valuable source on the material culture and spiritual life of the Paleolithic humans. The cave is also the only Gravettian find in the west Balkans and one of the richest and most important finds of the Upper Paleolithic in the Southeast Europe. A technological and typological analysis of the discovered materials, numerous stone artifacts and fauna remnants, and the subsequent accelerator mass spectrometry method, established that the cave was already inhabited in the Middle Paleolithic, 38,000 years ago. Materials discovered in the chronologically younger layers belong to the major Upper Paleolithic cultures of Europe, Aurignacian (31,000 years ago) and Gravettian (25,000 years ago).

A cave was still used for dwelling by the local population in the 4th century and then again from 12th to 15th century.
