= Grotta Gigante =

Giant cave on the Italian side of the Trieste Karst

Grotta Gigante (Giant Cave)
- Briška jama, Briškovska jama, Jama pri Briščikih
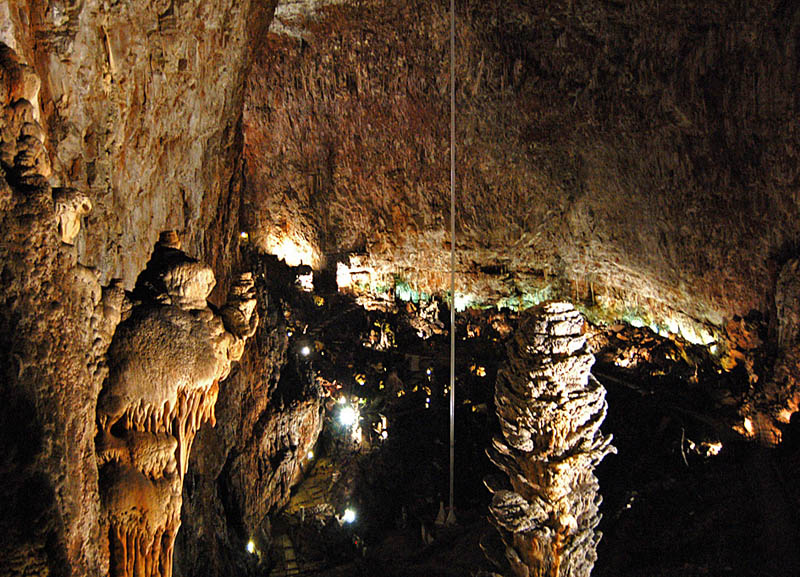
- Inside the cave looking towards the tourist entrance

- Location within Italy
- Interactive map of Grotta Gigante (Giant Cave)
- Location: Sgonico (TS, Friuli-Venezia Giulia, Italy)
- Coordinates: 45°42′33.18″N 13°45′49.79″E
- Depth: 115 m (377 ft)
- Length: 280 m (920 ft)
- Elevation: 275 m
- Discovery: 1840
- Geology: Karst cave
- Entrances: 1
- Access: Public
- Show cave opened: 1908
- Show cave length: 850 m
- Website: Official website

Grotta Gigante ("Giant Cave", Slovene: Briška jama or Jama pri Briščikih), also known as Riesengrotte or as Grotta di Brisciachi, is a giant cave on the Italian side of the Trieste Karst (Carso), close to the village of Borgo Grotta Gigante or Briščiki in the municipality of Sgonico. Its central cavern is 107 m (351 ft) high, 65 m (213 ft) wide and 130 m (430 ft) long, putting it in the 1995 Guinness Book of Records as the world's largest show cave. This record was broken in 2010 when La Verna cave in the south west of France was opened to tourists, measuring 255 by 225 by 195 metres (837 by 738 by 640 ft).

== Overview ==
The cave contains many large stalactites and stalagmites. A feature of the stalagmites is their "dish-pile" appearance, formed by water dropping from up to 80 m (260 ft) above and depositing calcium carbonate over a wide area.

The hall is 107 m (351 ft) high, 130 m (430 ft) long and 65 m (213 ft) wide. A steep path with atmospheric electric lighting allows the visitor to spend about 45 minutes in this underground space, with its rich calcite concretions, the highest of which is 12 m (39 ft) high.

Its available space and the constant temperatures throughout the year have led to the placement of scientific instruments, including the two Grotta Gigante horizontal pendulums which hang down from about 100 m (330 ft), and are the longest geodetic pendula in the world.

== History ==
The cave was first explored by Antonio Federico Lindner in 1840. At the time, the karst behind Trieste was being searched for underground water from the Timavo River so as to be able to plan the city's aqueduct. In 1897, it was fully mapped by Andrea Perko, properly equipped for guided tours in 1905 by Club Touristi Triestini, and inaugurated in 1908. After World War I, ownership went to the Julian Alpine Society. Tourism only really began in 1957, when electricity was installed, unveiling new perspectives and details.

== Museum ==
The Museum of Speleology is near the cave, and besides the various speleological, geological, and paleontological finds, it also includes some valuable archeological pieces and a poster collection of the cave. Two wide parking lots are available on the outside. Visits are scheduled at regular intervals throughout the day with expert guides. A guided walk through the cave takes about an hour.

== See also ==
- List of longest Dinaric caves
- List of deepest Dinaric caves
