= Slum, Croatia =

Slum Silun Mont'Aquila
- Village
- Location within Croatia
- Coordinates: 45.4368616°N 13.9746498°E
- Country: Croatia
- County: Istria County
- Municipality: Lanišće

Area
  - Total: 3.5 sq mi (9.1 km^{2})

Population (2021)
  - Total: 23
  - Density: 6.5/sq mi (2.5/km^{2})
- Time zone: UTC+1 (CET)
  - Summer (DST): UTC+2 (CEST)
- Postal code: 52420 Buzet
- Area code: 052

Slum (Italian: Silun Mont'Aquila) is a village in Lanišće municipality in Istria County, Croatia.

== Demographics ==
According to the 2021 census, its population was 23.
