= Brest, Croatia =

Brest Olmeto
- Village
- Location within Croatia
- Coordinates: 45.332499°N 14.1447003°E
- Country: Croatia
- County: Istria County
- Municipality: Lanišće

Area
  - Total: 2.5 sq mi (6.5 km^{2})

Population (2021)
  - Total: 31
  - Density: 12/sq mi (4.8/km^{2})
- Time zone: UTC+1 (CET)
  - Summer (DST): UTC+2 (CEST)
- Postal code: 52420 Buzet
- Area code: 052

Brest (Italian: Olmeto) is a village in Lanišće municipality in Istria County, Croatia.

== Demographics ==
According to the 2021 census, its population was 31.
