= Podgaće =

Podgaće Pogacce
- Village
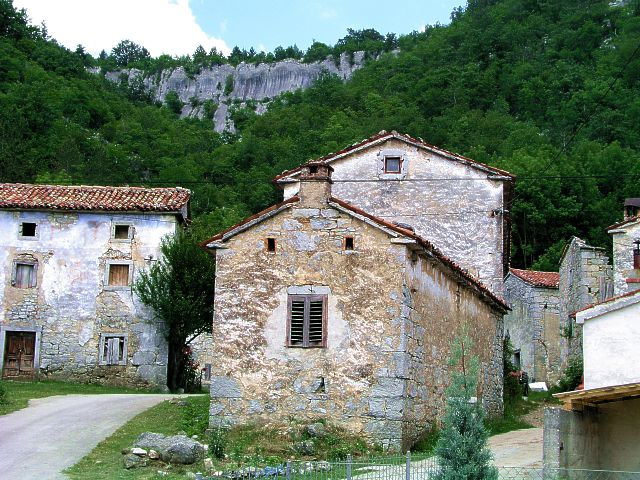

- Location within Croatia
- Coordinates: 45.4055204°N 14.0874589°E
- Country: Croatia
- County: Istria County
- Municipality: Lanišće

Area
  - Total: 4.7 sq mi (12.3 km^{2})

Population (2021)
  - Total: 44
  - Density: 9.3/sq mi (3.6/km^{2})
- Time zone: UTC+1 (CET)
  - Summer (DST): UTC+2 (CEST)
- Postal code: 52420 Buzet
- Area code: 052

Podgaće (Italian: Pogacce) is a village in Lanišće municipality in Istria County, Croatia.

== Demographics ==
According to the 2021 census, its population was 44.
