= Ledenjača Cave =

Cave in Bosnia and Herzegovina

Ledenjača
- Coordinates: 43°55′42″N 18°35′5″E

The Ledenjača is a cave system located in Bosnia and Herzegovina. It has a total length of 302 meters. Ice formations in the cave were once harvested for ice before artificial ice production was invented. In a 2018-2019 survey, scientists found evidence of over 18 species of bats, some of which has almost never before been seen in BiH.

== See also ==
- List of longest Dinaric caves
