= Grotta Gigante horizontal pendulums =

Coordinates: 45°42′33.18″N 13°45′49.79″E

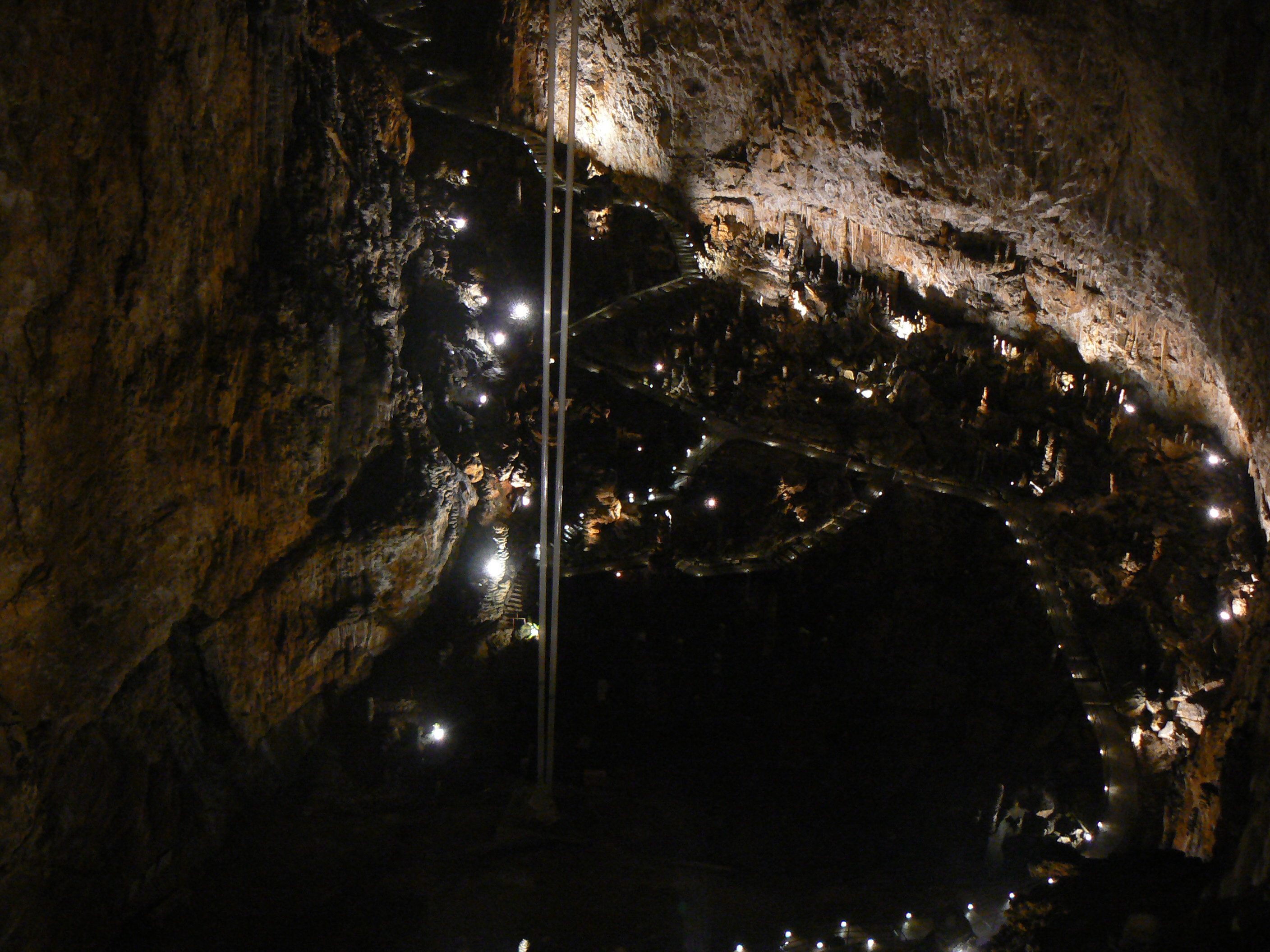
View of the caves showing the two pendulums

The Grotta Gigante horizontal pendulums are a pair of tiltmeters used for monitoring Earth movements, mounted in the Grotta Gigante in Italy. The horizontal pendulums, installed by the geodesist Antonio Marussi in 1959, are sensitive to deviations of the vertical, to rotations and shearing of the cave.

The pendulum beam is suspended horizontally by two steel wires, an upper one fixed to the roof of the cave, the lower one fixed to the floor. The pendulum beam rotates in the horizontal plane around a virtual near-to-vertical axis that passes through the upper and lower mounting points.

== Measurements ==
Some movements are aperiodic, others regular, as the Earth tides caused by the lunar and solar gravitational field. The pendulums measure a distance of 95 m between the upper and lower mountings, which contributes to the fact that the instruments detect tectonic movements with high precision and are relatively immune to some of the noise which affects smaller instruments.

The Earth's crust is the outer brittle layer of our planet, on average 35 kilometres (22 mi) thick in continental areas. This moves up and down by ten centimeters during the time of 12 and 24 hours due to the attraction of Moon and Sun, and is accompanied by a local tilting of some parts in a billion of radians.

The movements of the pendulums has contributed to identify the free oscillations of the Earth, and to show that the secular term tilting of the cave is towards the northwest. The marine tides of the Adriatic have a loading effect in the cave, as have also the underground karstic floods of the river Timavo that disappears at the Škocjan Caves in Slovenia. The Grotta Gigante tiltmeters are the only existing instruments to have recorded four out of five greatest earthquakes in the recent 50 years, which are the earthquakes of Chile 1960 (the greatest earthquake ever instrumentally recorded) and Chile 2010 (the fifth in the scale of recorded worldwide mega-events) the tsunami-generating event of the Sumatra-Andaman islands of 2004 (third greatest event) and the event of Japan 2011 (fourth greatest event), allowing an absolute-amplitude comparison between these events.
