= Ćići =

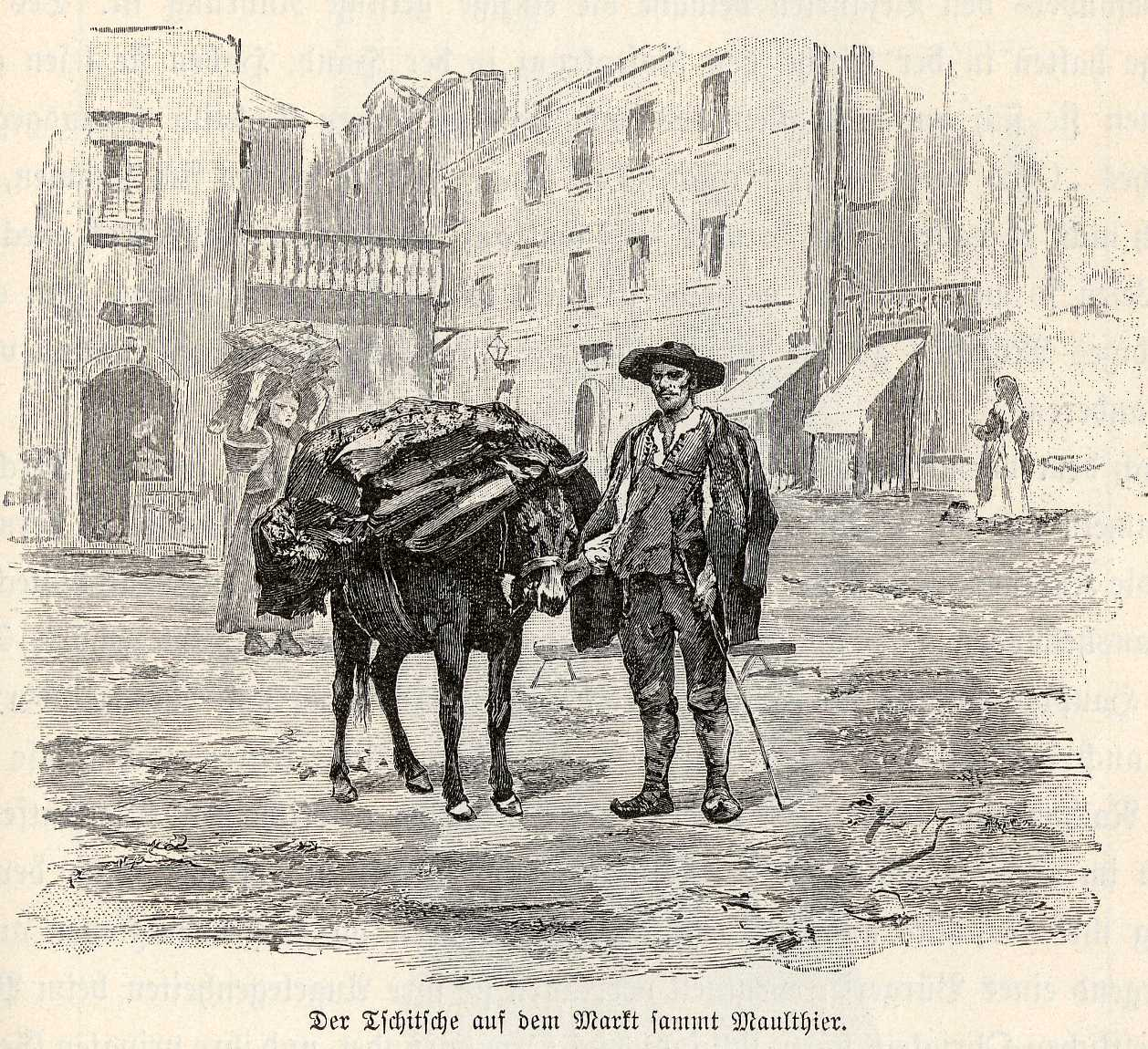
Drawing of a Ćić from 1891.

Ćić (plural Ćići, Slovene: Čiči, German: Tschitschen, Italian: Cicci, Chicchi, Ciccio, Cici) is an ethnonym and exonym in a broader sense for all the people who live in the mountainous Ćićarija area in Croatia and Slovenia. Alongside the term Ćiribirci, in the narrow sense, it is an exonym referring to a community of the Istro-Romanians in the village Žejane in a small part of eastern Ćićarija and the villages around the former Lake Čepić west of the Učka range in Istria, Croatia.

== Etymology ==
The first, unspecified thesis of possible Romance origin was given by Franz Miklosich in 1860 when he designated all Čiči as "overall Slavicized Romanians". Linguist and phonologist Josip Ribarić (1880–1954), a native of Vodice in Ćićarija, disproved this thesis with historical documents, anthroponyms and language dialects in the karst. According to him, the term Ćići initially referred to the Romance-speaking Balkan population, the same as Morlachs (i.e. Vlachs) and became an exonym for all newcomers to the karst plateau.

Ribarić noted the thesis by Arthur Byhan (1899), which asserted that Chichi (ch/ci=ć) comes from the Italian word cicaleccio (from verb cicalare), which means "insistent and confused (indistinct) talking". They were so named by the Slavs because they couldn't understand them. Petar Šimunović similarly proposed Croatian verb variations čičerati or čičarati, čačarat and k'ik'rat, which mean "speak". Ribarić noted that Croats in Istria meant "speaking Istro-Romanian" when using the term čičerati and the term drakulati (from draku, "dragon, devil") was used in the villages of Male Mune and Vele Mune for the speech of Žejane. Šimunović proposed the interrogative pronoun ći (što/ča?) in the meaning "what?", while Ribarić the syllable či appeared in all the mentioned words that the Romance speaking Vlachs often used and was unusual to the Slavs.

Ribarić noted two other terms that could supply the origin; Cincari for Aromanians in Macedonia, Bulgaria and Serbia and Ćiribirci in Istria. In Istro-Romanian language was noted the secondary palatalization, in village Šušnjevica t becomes ț ("c"), in Nova Vas and Žejane becomes č. The term Cincari or Tsinstari comes from Vulgar Latin tsintsi, Megleno-Romanian ținți, meaning numeral five and as such deriving tsintsi-ținți-cinci-činči-(n)-čiči-ćići. The term Ćiribîrci derives from Čiribiri, from čire (lat. qui ne, ține-cine-țire-cire-čire, who/you) and bire from bine (lat. bene, good), meaning a greeting "hold well". Ignaz Hermann Bidermann in 1877 interpreted it as a derivative of "ćîć" from genitive plural of "čičā", which derives from Slavic word "čiko" or "čika" meaning old man, or uncle. Ribarić opposed it and noted "Ćìć" is in nominative singular, and "čiča" is not found in any Istrian dialect.

Ćić or Čič, in Northern Chakavian as Ćȉć is pronounced more softly than in Shtokavian dialect, in Italian same as Shtokavian, while in Žejane as Čȉč. Other exonyms and its variations include Čičerani, Cicerani, Čiribiri, Čiribirci. The residents, especially older generations of Ćićarija, for themselves rather used ethnonym Slovinci or Slavinci and for language Slovinski or Slavinski. Over the centuries the national and political name of Croats in Ćićarija was forgotten for some time, mostly due to lack of cultural institutions and the national revival influenced by Slovenian priests and teachers.

== History ==
The term is mostly mentioned in Croatia. First mentions date from the early 15th century as a surname in Istria in the 1463 Glagolitic psalter by priest Petar Fraščić. It referred to a group who, under Ivan Frankopan, plunder Istrian territory beneath mountain Učka. In 1499, the Carinthian parish priest, Jakob Urnest, mentioned territory Czyschnlandt between Croatian and Bosnian kingdoms (zwischn Wossen und Krabaten), which some consider to be the Cetina river region in southern Croatia. Some individual cases, such as the penal records of Trieste from the year 1500, contain an inscription of an accused who, when asked of his home country, replied Ciccio da Segna (Senj), while another man declared himself as Ciccio da S. Michele di Leme (Lim valley in Istria).

Villages in Western Ćićarija (Lanišće municipality), Golac (Slovenia) and Eastern Ćićarija, Vele Mune and Male Mune, Žejane (which is located in the Matulji municipality and part of Rašpor or Podgrad estate), were mentioned in the 13th and early 14th century. Those villages, as seen from 1414 and 1419 documents, became almost deserted and so exempted from taxation in the war between Venice and the Kingdom of Hungary and Croatia. From 1469 till 1501, many Turk raids occurred in the karst. Because of this, the possibility of migration and organized settlement is disputable. In the early 1500s, Krsto Frankopan was involved in the struggle between Venice and Austria at the borderland of eastern Istria, Rašpor (Croatian Ćićarija) and Podgrad (Slovenian Ćićarija) citadel estates. It resulted in the Frankopan's destruction of the Rašpor citadel because of a peace agreement in 1521 that made Podgrad Austrian and Rašpor Venetian property. Afterwards, western Jelovice, Novaki, Vodice and eastern Vele Mune and Male Mune and Žejane village became Austrian property.

The exact date is unknown, but between 1510 and 1525, Frankopan settled villages Vele Mune, Male Mune and Žejane. In the document, settled families were mentioned. Most of their surnames persist post-millennium. In 1523 and 1527, Tschitschen and Tschizen aus Krabatten were settled in the estate of Lupoglav. In 1528, Tschitschen were mentioned in regard of possible settling in Modruš and other lands as a resistance against Martolos. In 1539, royal commissioner Erasmo von Thurn submitted a request by Ćići to King Ferdinand I, asking if they could be given some deserted land on karst and Istria. This was partially accepted. In 1530, the Ćići were prohibited from purchasing grain in Novo Mesto and Metlika in Lower Carniola.

== Language ==
In 1877, Jan Baudouin de Courtenay noticed that in Male Mune, Vele Mune, Podgrad and Ćići, the people spoke Serbo-Croatian in the Chakavian dialect. In 1884, Viljem Urbas and in 1891 Milan Rešetar, assumed the existence of Shtokavian elements in their speech and areas with Chakavian-Shtokavian sub dialect. Ribarić, who is notable for making the first dialects map in Istria, observed multiple dialects in Karst. People from the Slovenian part mostly spoke the Kajkavian dialect and were called by the nicknames "Brkini", "Šavrini" or "Kraševci". The Chakavian-Kajkavian dialect was spoken by people in the lower part of the Lanišće municipality, in the villages Lanišće, Podgaće, Prapoće, Račja Vas, Klenovšćak, Kropinjak, Brest and Slum. It was mainly used within the village, as many adults also spoke Chakavian-Shtokavian. In Istria, the Kajkavian and Kajkavian-Chakavian speaking people used the exonym Bezjak. As those people lived in Ćićarija, they were called Ćići, which they did not accept as Brkini. The Ćići who spoke Chakavian-Shtokavian, although they did not differ in lifestyle, sometimes scornfully used the exonym Bezjaci when referring to them. Likewise, the nickname Ćić was scornfully used by Bezjaks and other Istrians as well.

The Middle Chakavian dialect of Ikavian accent, which was spoken in Dalmatia, Krbava and now parts of western Bosnia, is represented in some villages of part of the Matulji municipality: Lipa, Rupa, Šapjane, Pasjak, Brdce, Veli Brgud, Mali Brgud, Vele Mune, Male Mune and Žejane, and in Slovenian villages of the Ilirska Bistrica municipality: Podgrad, Starod, Račice, Podbeže, while Obrov, Poljane and Skadanščina in Hrpelje-Kozina (see Čičarija dialect). Ribarić found Chakavian-Shtokavian elements in Žejane. The Village Brgudac was included in Southern Chakavian Ikavian dialect. Chakavian-Shtokavian of the Ikavian accent, is represented in the upper part of the Lanišće municipality in the villages of Rašpor, Črnehi, Trstenik, Dane, Vodice, and Jelovice. The accent can also be found in the Slovenian Hrpelje-Kozina municipality, the village Golac and smaller villages Gojaki, Zagrad, Brdo.

== Culture ==
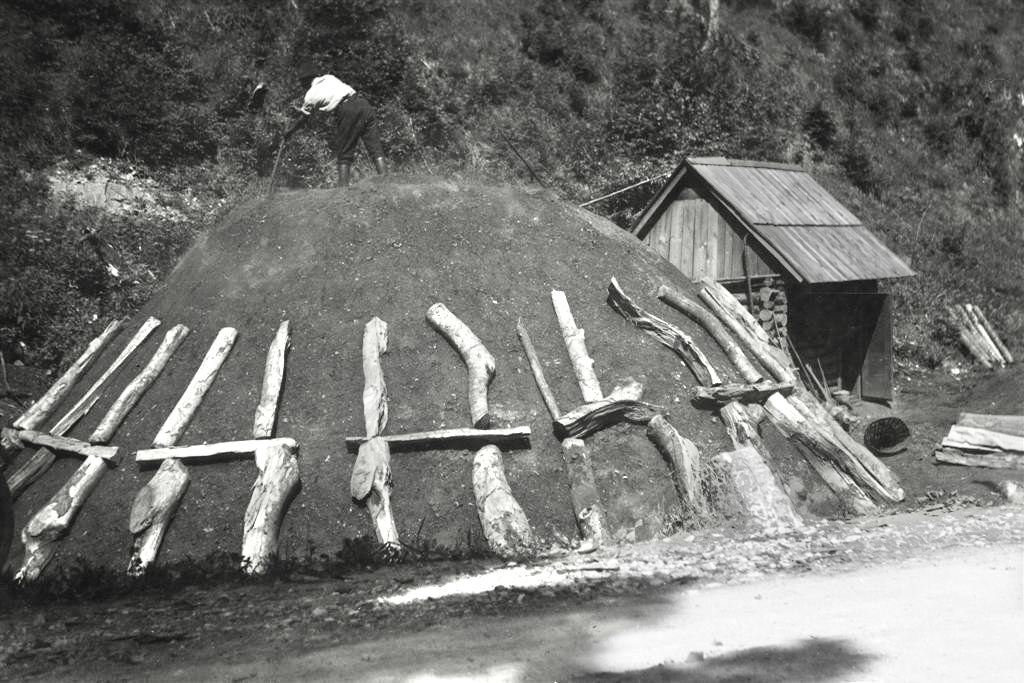
The covered wood pile Ćići built for making charcoal. Image from Slovenia.

Ćići are Roman Catholic. Almost all village churches date at least since the 16th century (some renovated and rebuilt by 20th century), but according to historical sources and late Gothic architecture elements some churches date since early 14th century.

They made their living with semi-nomadic shepherding, selling lambs and wool and using the milk to make various dairy products, particularly cheese. Pastures and meadows were used as hay fields and in autumn, for grazing. However, for grazing in winter, they migrated to southern Istria. Farming covered personal needs, mostly potato, cabbage, beans, beet and less wheat, barley, oat and corn. Substantial income was acquired from forestry, cutting firewood, logging transported by draft horses and most often making k(a)rbunica, a wood pile covered with soil, producing charcoal. After 1945, agriculture and forestry weren't enough to maintain living standards.

In Istria the Ćići in Ćićarija and in village Žejane were known for now almost extinct practice of singing folk songs, called bugarštine. This way of singing in Istria is known as bugarenje, while in Ćićarija also as pivati po starinsku, rozgat, kantat, guditi (Vodice, Dane, Jelovice, Golac), and žaliti (mourn). Males and females sing differently. The guditi' or žaliti, (laments) is performed mostly by women everyday and when someone dies. In bugarenje are present melancholic verses of lyric, lyric-epic and epic poetry while the verses are short decasyllabics. Themes of epic poetry are mostly related to the Ottoman occupation. In contrast to epic poetry in Dalmatia and other parts of the Balkans, only three Turkish words (harač, ćorda, delija) were mentioned. The tradition of rain ritual prporuša was present until 20th century.

== See also ==
- Morlachs
- Vlachs of Croatia
- Istro-Romanians
