= Prapoće =

Prapoće Praporchie
- Village
- Location within Croatia
- Coordinates: 45.4179629°N 14.0444287°E
- Country: Croatia
- County: Istria County
- Municipality: Lanišće

Area
  - Total: 3.5 sq mi (9.1 km^{2})

Population (2021)
  - Total: 31
  - Density: 8.8/sq mi (3.4/km^{2})
- Time zone: UTC+1 (CET)
  - Summer (DST): UTC+2 (CEST)
- Postal code: 52422 Lanišće
- Area code: 052

Prapoće (Italian: Praporchie) is a village in Lanišće municipality in Istria County, Croatia.

== Geography ==
It is situated in a karst polje, part of which is referred to by the toponym Ponikve.

== Demographics ==
According to the 2021 census, its population was 31.
