= Šalitrena Cave =

Cave in Brežđe, Serbia

- Saltpeter Cave
- Location within Serbia
- Location: Brežđe, Serbia
- Coordinates: 44°11′26.64″N 20°4′41.7″Eyes
- Discovery: 1970s

Šalitrena Cave (Serbian: Šalitrena Pećina) is located in the boundaries of the atar municipality Brežđe, about 6 km from Mionica and 3 km upstream from the Ribnica Monastery and Ribnica Cave. It is the richest Paleolithic find of the central and west Balkan Peninsula, a valuable source on the material culture and spiritual life of the Paleolithic humans. The cave is also the only Gravettian find in the west Balkans and one of the richest and most important finds of the Upper Paleolithic in the Southeast Europe.

== Analysis ==
The oldest remains were from occasional habitation by prehistoric hunters during the Middle Paleolithic, 80,000-40,000 years ago. It is also the only Gravettian site in the west Balkans and one of the richest and most important sites of Upper Paleolithic in Southeast Europe. A technological and typological analysis of the discovered materials, numerous stone artifacts and fauna remnants, and the subsequent accelerator mass spectrometry method, established that the cave was already inhabited in the Middle Paleolithic, 38,000 years ago. Materials discovered in the chronologically younger layers belong to the major Upper Paleolithic cultures of Europe, Aurignacian (31,000 years ago) and Gravettian (25,000 years ago).

It was used as a hideout in troubled times during the 4th century, and then again from 12th to 15th century, which is documented by archaeological findings. It was officially discovered during the reconnaissance of the Ribnica river valley by a group of young researchers from Valjevo during the 1970s.
