= Slivnica (mountain) =

Mountain in Slovenia

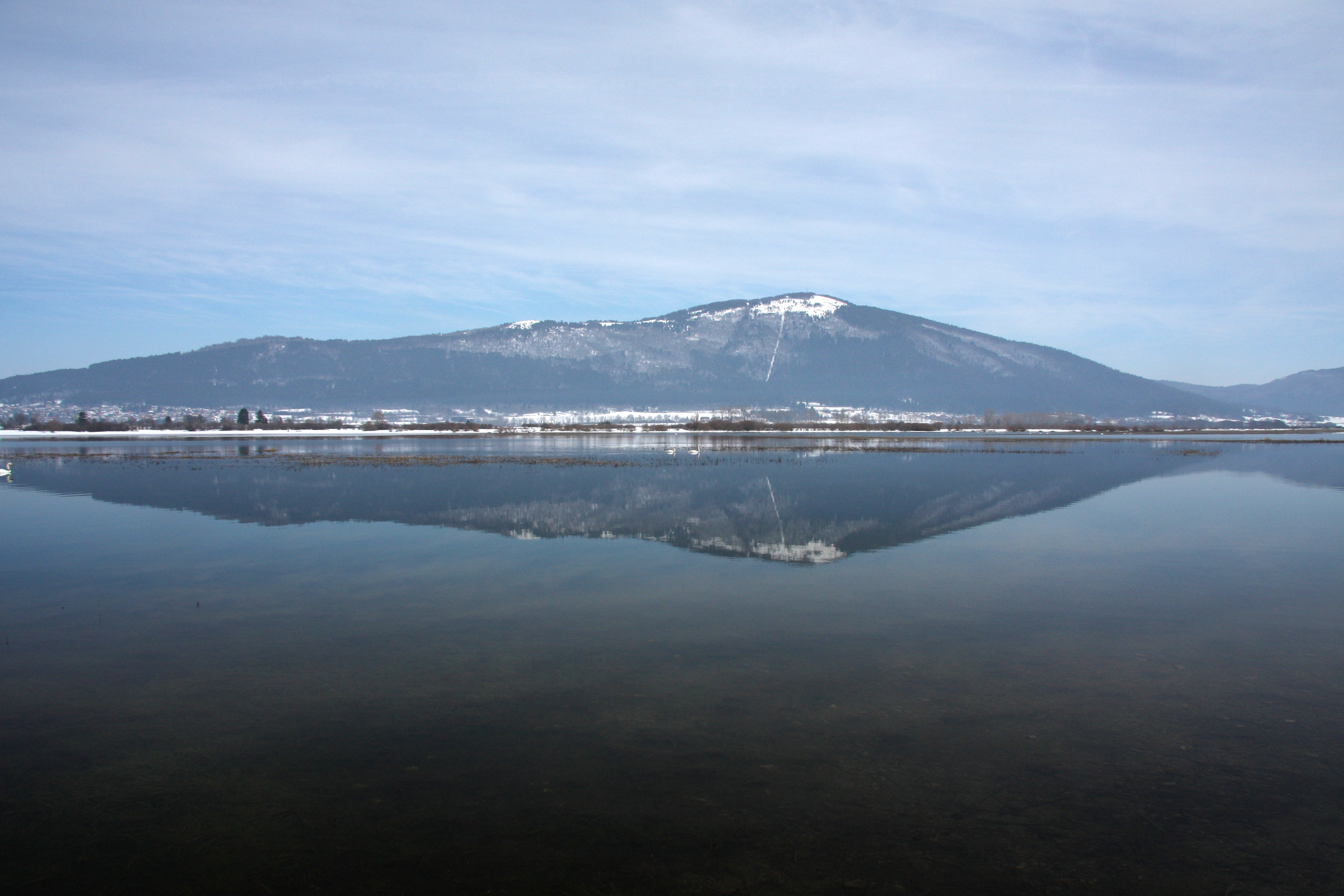
- view from across Lake Cerknica

Highest point
- Elevation: 1,114 m (3,655 ft)
- Coordinates: 45°47′24″N 14°24′28″E

Geography
- Location within Slovenia
- Location: Slovenia
- Parent range: Dinaric Alps

Slivnica (pronounced [ˈslíːwnitsa]; 1,114 metres or 3,655 feet) is a peak in the Dinaric Alps in Slovenia, southeast of Cerknica on the edge of the plain defined by Lake Cerknica. Its southern and western slopes are covered in deciduous and pine forests, which also obstruct the view from the highest peak, Big Slivnica (Slovene: Velika Slivnica).

A karst cave below the summit of Slivnica, known as Witches' Cave (Coprniška jama) was described by Valvasor in his The Glory of the Duchy of Carniola (1689) as a hole where storms were made. Warm air rises from the cave in the cold winter months and condenses to form mist, a phenomenon that contributed to the creation of the local legend about the Slivnica witches, traditionally blamed for all misfortune by local farmers from hail storms to various ailments.
