= Maganik =

Mountain range in central Montenegro

- Маганик
- Location within Montenegro

Highest point
- Elevation: 2,139 m (7,018 ft)
- Coordinates: 42°43′54″N 19°17′02″E

Geography
- Location: Montenegro

Maganik (Montenegrin Cyrillic: Маганик, pronounced [maɡǎniːk]) is a mountain range in Central Montenegro. The highest point of Maganik is Međeđi Vrh ("Bear's summit"), which is 2,139 m (7,018 ft) high.

== Features ==
Maganik is 20 km long and 10 km wide mountain range, located in central Montenegro. It is bordered by Zeta, Morača and Mrtvica rivers.

The geological composition of Maganik is made of cretaceous limestone. The base of the mountain range from the Nikšić side and the Morača River valley is made up of Triassic limestone. The canyon slopes of the river Mrtvica are formed by Triassic, Jurassic and cretaceous limestone, which created a rich vertical jaggedness to the Maganik mass. Its relief is enriched with deep karst hollows, valleys and funnel-shaped depressions. The rock formations are razor-sharp on some places. Thus, Maganik is considered one of the most demanding and inaccessible mountaineering destinations in Montenegro.

=== Peaks ===
The highest peaks of Maganik are:

- Međeđi Vrh 2,139 m (7,018 ft)
- Petrov Vrh 2,124 m (6,969 ft)
- Babin Zub 2,119 m (6,952 ft)
- Žuta Greda 2,104 m (6,903 ft)
- Rogođed 2,037 m (6,683 ft)
- Kokotov Vrh 2,001 m (6,565 ft)
- Cakmakov Vrh 1,974 m (6,476 ft)

== 1973 aircrash incident ==
On 11 September 1973, Jat Airways Sud Aviation SE-210 Caravelle 6-N (YU-AHD) flew into the Babin Zub peak while attempting to start the descent towards the Titograd Airport. All 41 people on board were killed.
