= Ćićarija =

Mountainous plateau in Croatia and Slovenia

- Slovene: Čičarija, Italian: Cicceria, Istro Romanian: Ciceria, German: Tschitschen Boden
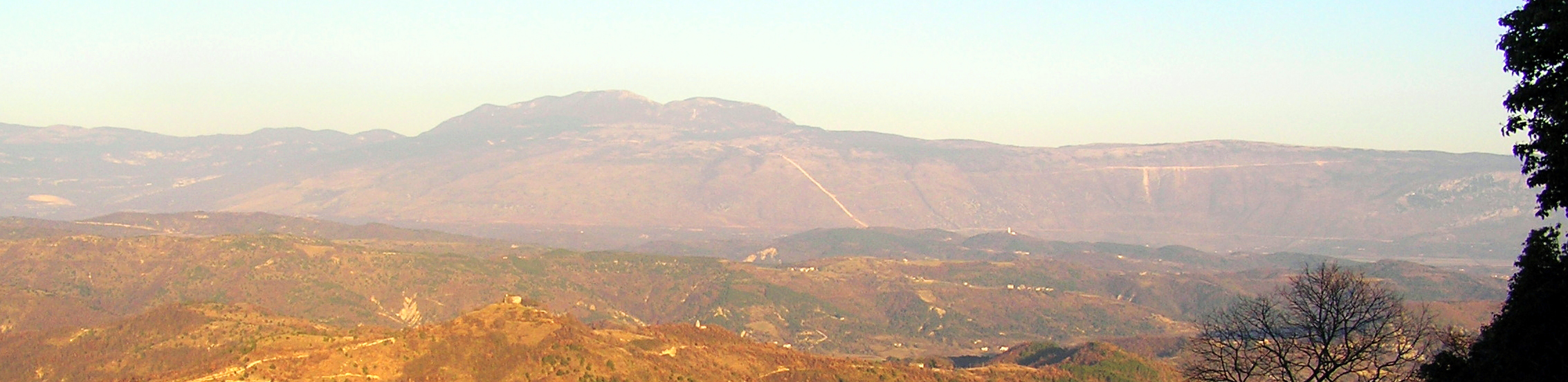
- Ćićarija seen from Gračišće

Highest point
- Elevation: 1,272 m (4,173 ft)
- Coordinates: 45°21′38″N 14°11′31″E

Geography
- Location within Croatia
- Location: Croatia-Slovenia border in Istria

Ćićarija (Slovene: Čičarija; Italian: Cicceria, Monti della Vena; Istro Romanian: Ciceria; German: Tschitschen Boden) is a mountainous plateau in the northern and northeastern part of the Istria peninsula, 45 kilometers (28 mi) long and 10–15 kilometers (6.2–9.3 mi) wide. It mostly lies in Croatia, while its northern part lies in southwestern Slovenia (the traditional region of Inner Carniola). The highest peak is Veliki Planik at 1,272 meters (4,173 ft).

At 7 inhabitants per square kilometer (18/sq mi) (2001), Ćićarija is sparsely populated, due to its karst landscape, poor economic development and rough climate.

== Name ==
The name Ćićarija is derived from the South Slavic term Ćić, which refers to Istrians living in the area around the Učka Mountains, originally referring to the Vlachs and Istro-Romanians of the area. The ethnonym is believed to derive from the Istro-Romanian word ce 'what', which is a semantic basis for other regional ethnonyms (cf. Kajkavian, Chakavian, etc.).

== Sources ==
- Croatian Encyclopedia. "Ćićarija" (in Croatian).
- Istrian Encyclopedia. "Ćićarija" (in Croatian).
- Istrapedia. "Ćićarija" (in Croatian).

== Bibliography ==
- Poljak, Željko (February 1959). "Istra i Učka". Kazalo za "Hrvatski planinar" i "Naše planine" 1898—1958 (PDF). Naše planine. Vol. XI. pp. 12–13. ISSN 0354-0650.
