= Šujica =

Šujica may refer to:

== Places ==
- Šujica, Slovenia, village in Slovenia
- Šuica, Bosnia and Herzegovina, village in Bosnia and Herzegovina

== Rivers ==
- Šuica (river), river in Bosnia and Herzegovina
