= Suica (disambiguation) =

Suica is a contactless smart card used in Japan.

Suica, Šuica or Șuica can also refer to:

== Persons ==
- Dubravka Šuica

== Places ==
- Šujica, Dobrova–Polhov Gradec, a village in Slovenia
- Šuica, Bosnia and Herzegovina
- Șuica, a village in the commune Scornicești, Olt County, Romania

== Rivers ==
- Šuica (river), Bosnia and Herzegovina
- Șuica, a tributary of the Negrișoara in Olt County, Romania
