= Bistrica (Drina) =

River in Bosnia and Herzegovina

Bistrica Dobropoljka
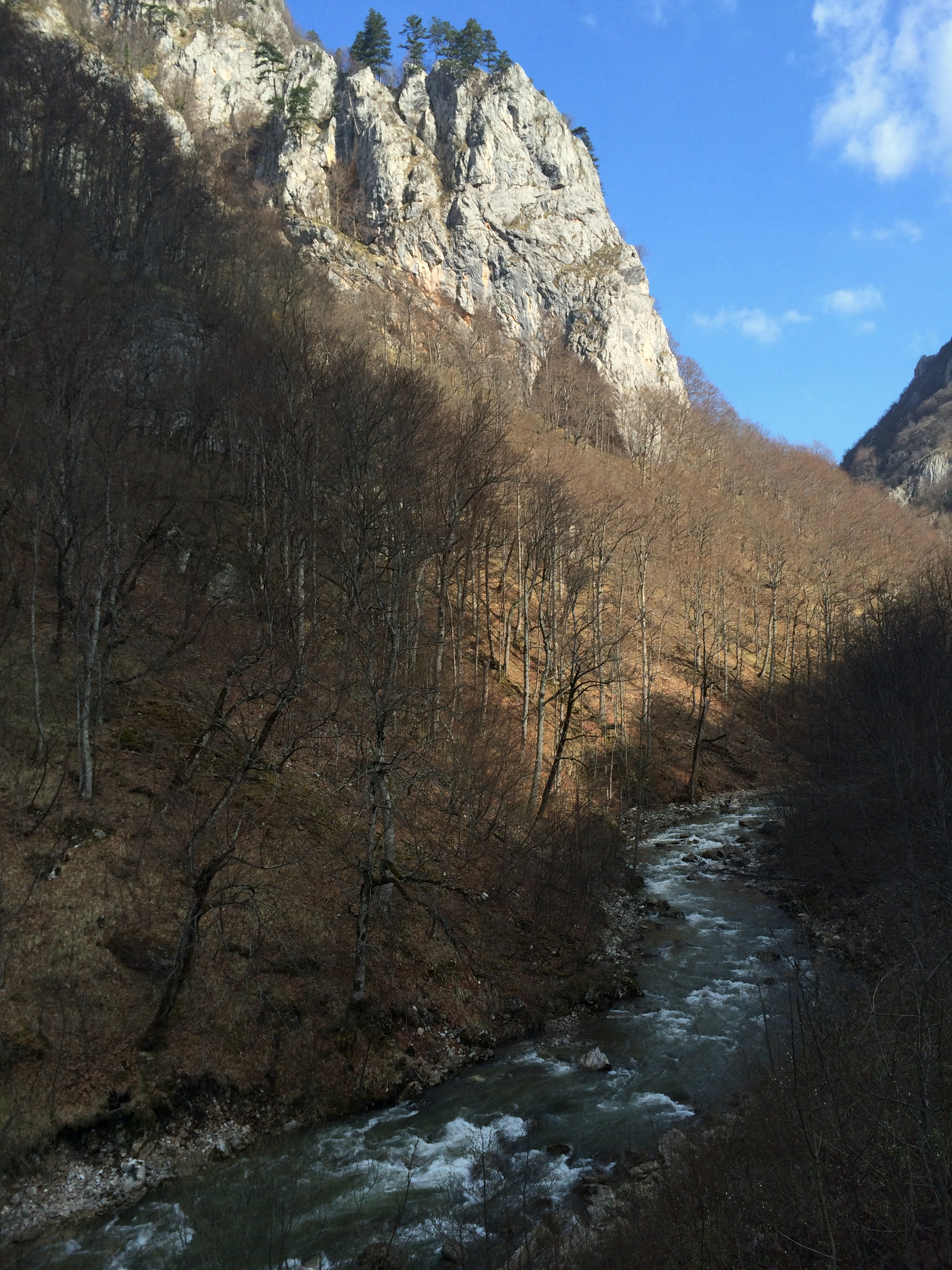
- Canyon of Dobropoljka/Bistrica, just downstream of confluence with its main headwater river the Dobropoljka

- Location within Bosnia and Herzegovina
- Etymology: Bistra voda / Clear water

Location
- State: Bosnia and Herzegovina
- Municipality: Kupres, Tomislavgrad
- Region: Tropolje
- Settlements: Šuica, Mokronoge, Letka, Kovači

Physical characteristics
- Source
  - location: Treskavica
  - coordinates: 43.603525°N 18.417358°E
  - elevation: 1,280 m (4,200 ft)
- 2nd source
  - location: Treskavica
- Mouth: Drina
  - location: Brod na Drini
  - coordinates: 43.490642°N 18.744265°E
  - elevation: 394 m (1,293 ft)
- Length: 43.3 km (26.9 mi)

Basin features
- Progression: Drina → Sava → Danube → Black Sea
- River system: Drina
- Cities: Miljevina; Brod na Drini
- Tributaries
  - left: Draženica, Vran, Rijeka, Miljevka
  - right: Gradovi potok, Oteša, Gvoza

The Bistrica (Serbian Cyrillic: Бистрица), also Dobropoljka, is a left tributary of the Drina. It springs out of the massif of Treskavica mountain. The source-group is made up of a dozen smaller springs and streams, while the Bistrica spring itself is located in a cave at 1280 m above sea level at the site of Siljevice. It passes through Dobro Polje where it is called Dobropoljka or Dobropoljska Rijeka. Just beneath Dobro Polje, river creates a huge natural arch through the limestone rock of its canyon, which is protected Nature Monument.

The length of the river is 43.3 km, its catchment area is 425.0 km², and its mouth is located at Vučijak locality in Brod na Drini, near Foča, at 394 m above sea level. The most significant left tributaries are the Drazenica river at 10.8 km long, and the Miljevka river at 13.2 km long, while the right tributaries are the Oteša river at 15.2 km long, and the Govza river at 21.9 km long.

== Gallery ==
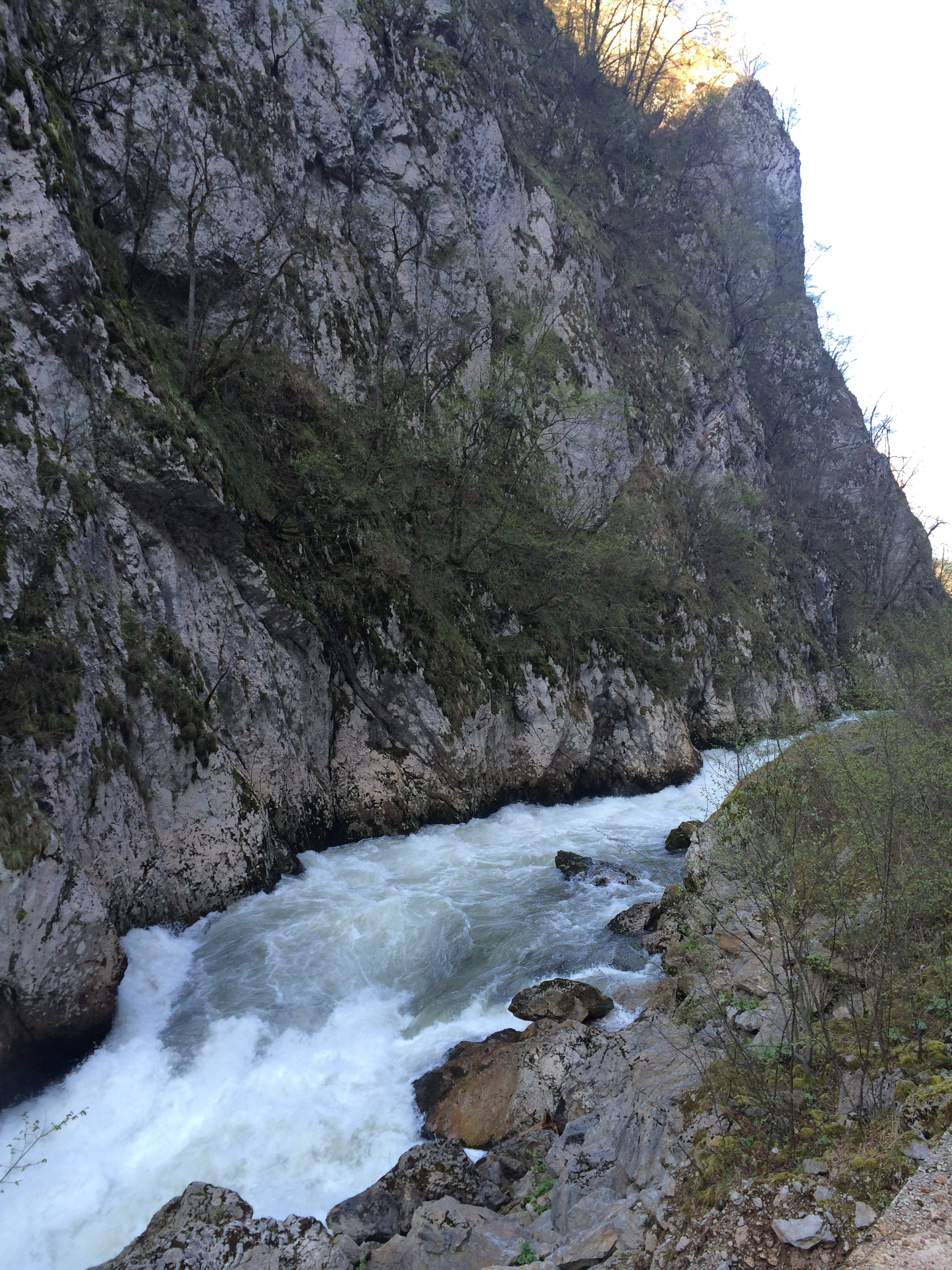
Bistrica, canyon

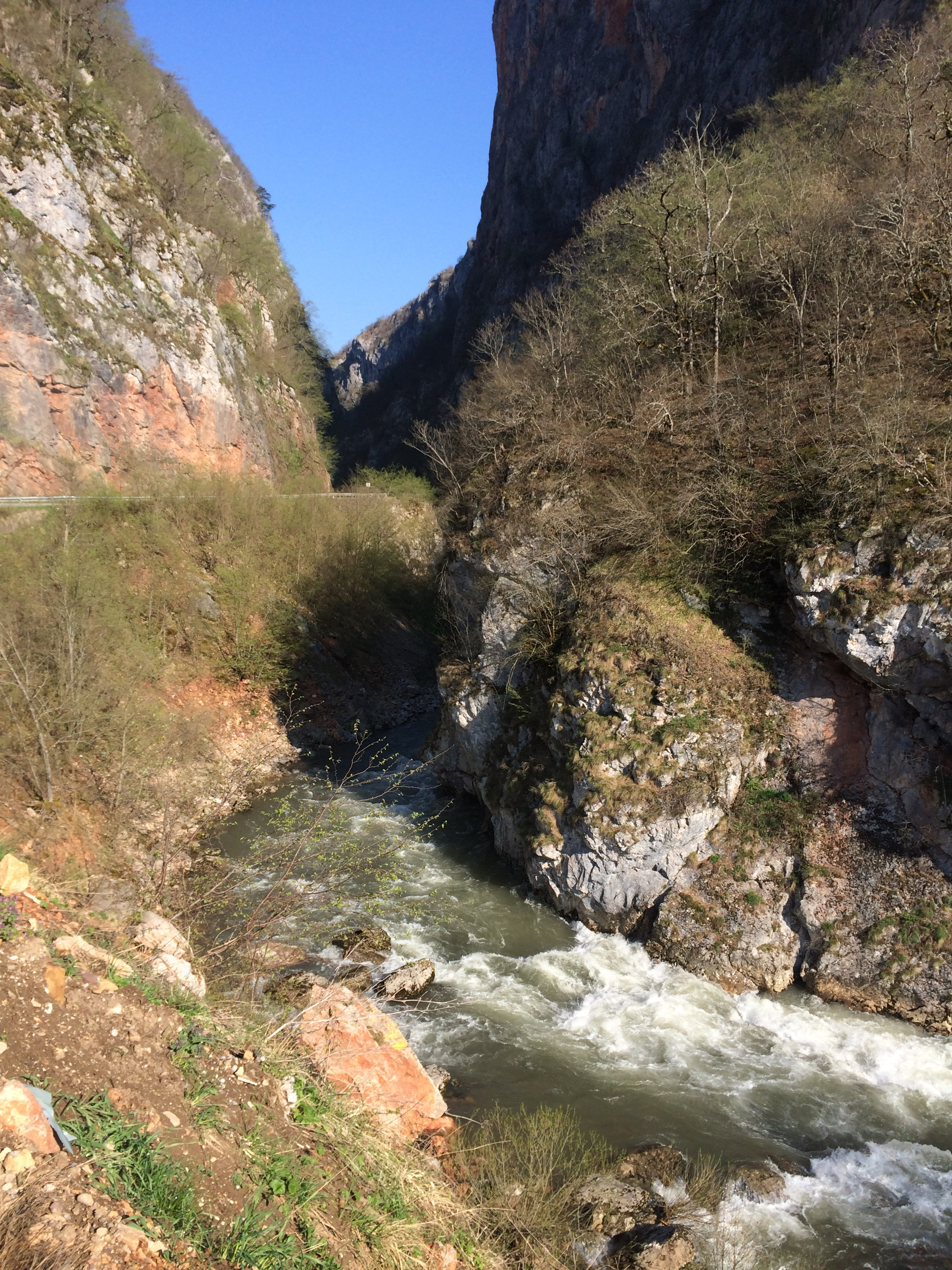
Bistrica, canyon

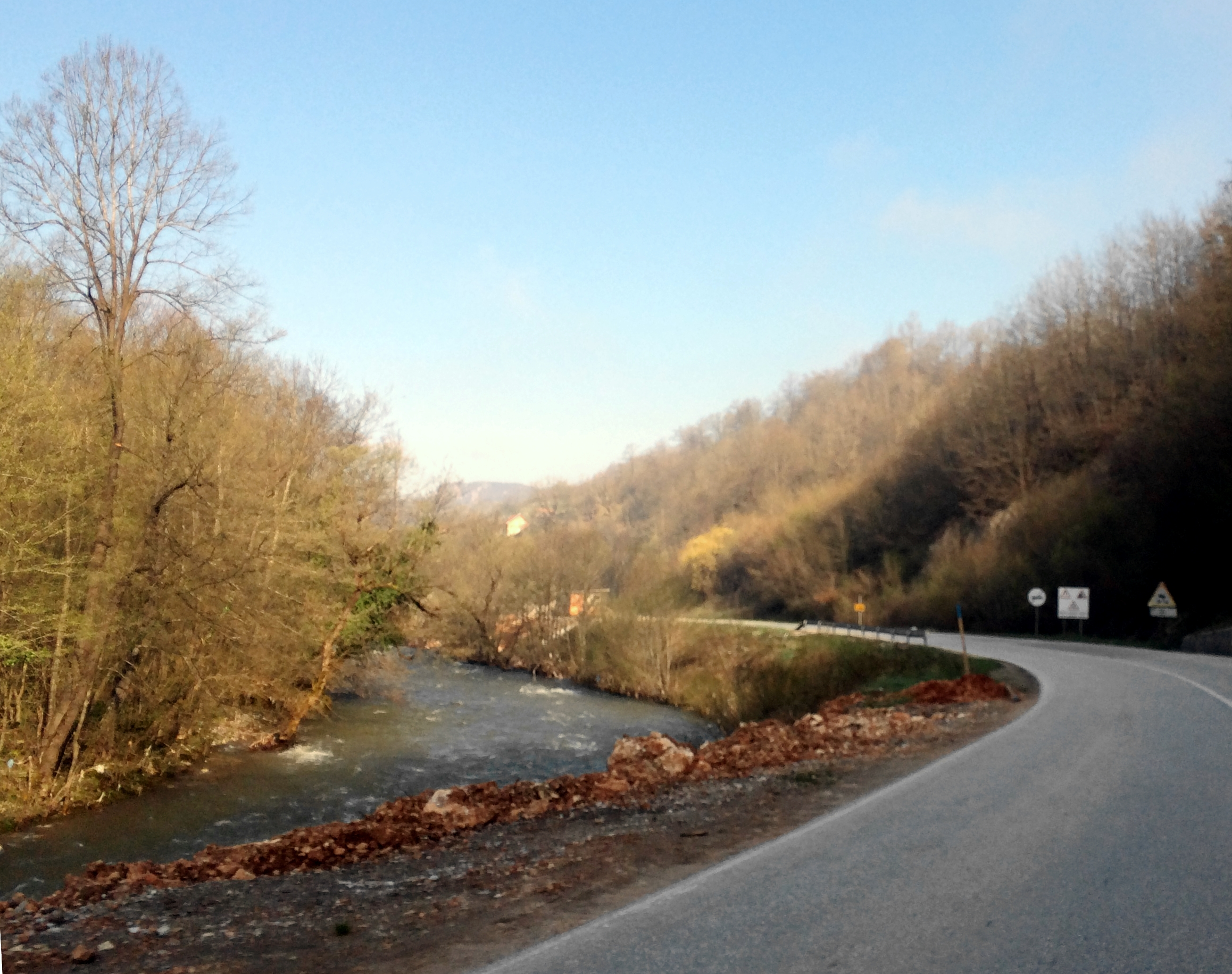
Bistrica, between Miljevina and Brod na Drini.

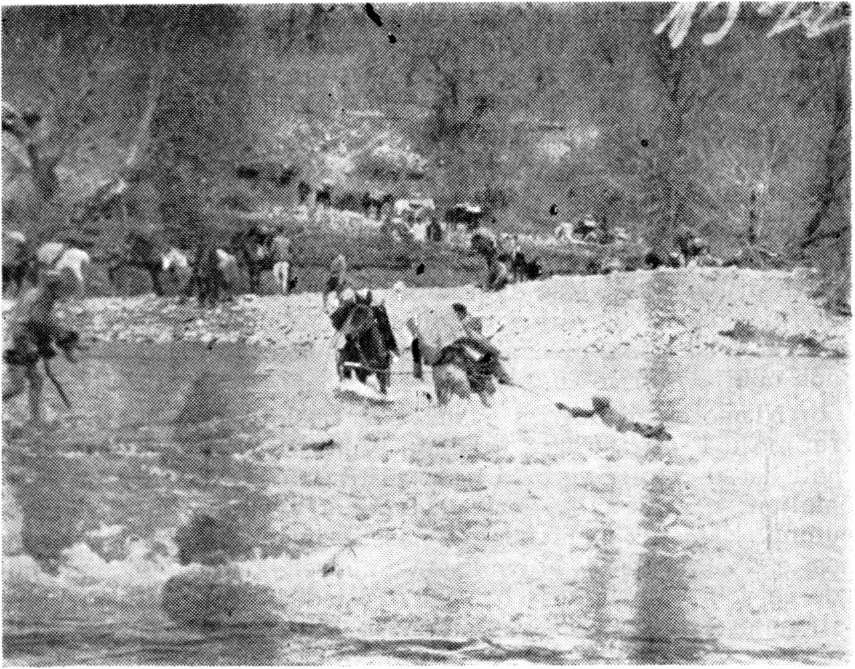
The 2nd Proletarian Brigade crosses the Bistrica, April 1943

== See also ==
- List of rivers of Bosnia and Herzegovina

== Bibliography ==
- Географски ресурси БиХ (PDF). Бања Лука: Природно математички факултет. 2006. Archived from the original (PDF) on June 11, 2021.
