= Galečić =

- Village
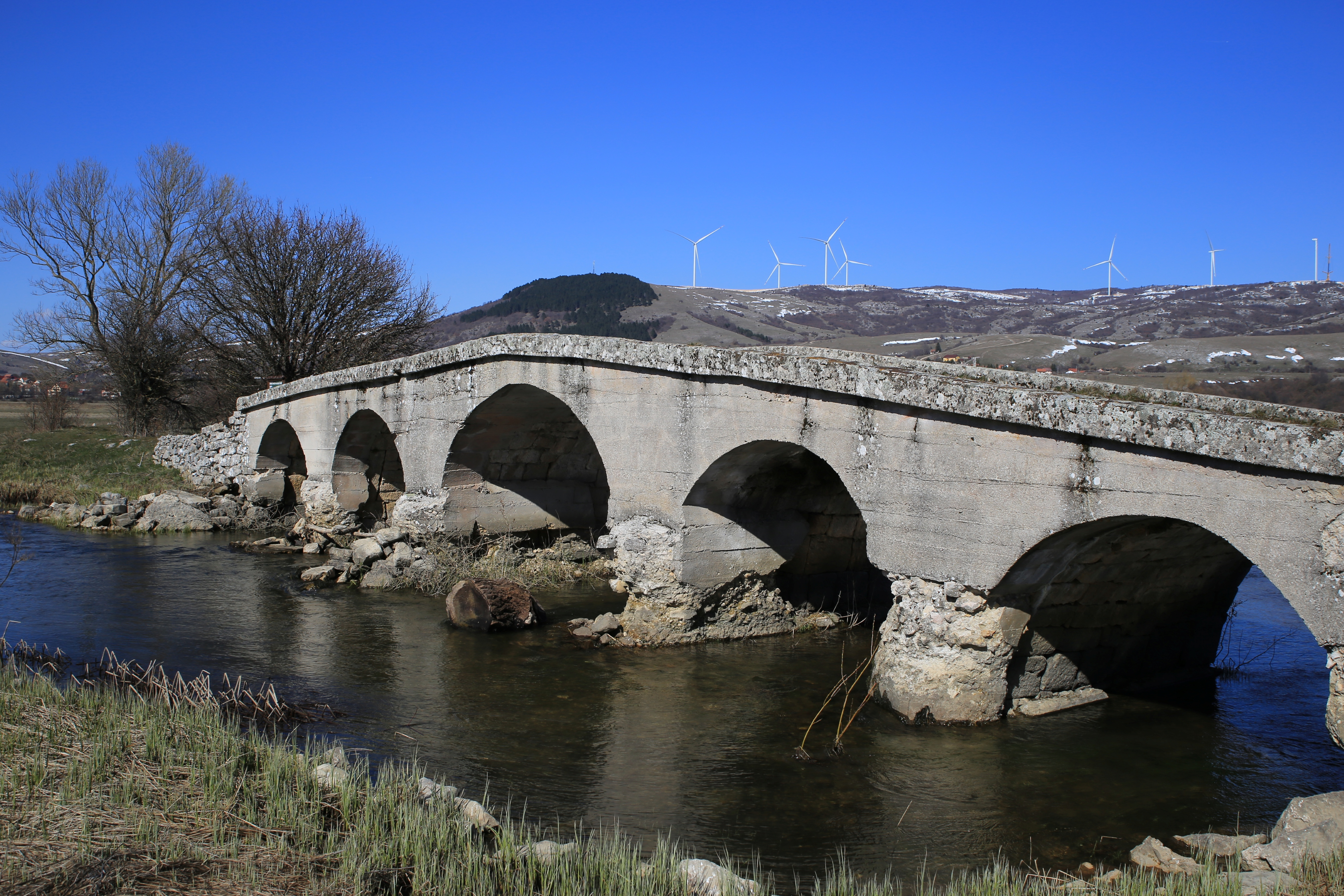
- Galečka Ćuprija

- Location within Bosnia and Herzegovina
- Coordinates: 43.814353°N 17.187356°E
- Country: Bosnia and Herzegovina
- Entity: Federation of Bosnia and Herzegovina
- Canton: Canton 10
- Municipality: Tomislavgrad

Area
  - Total: 25.26 km^{2} (9.75 sq mi)

Population (2013)
  - Total: 279
  - Density: 11.0/km^{2} (28.6/sq mi)
- Time zone: UTC+1 (CET)
  - Summer (DST): UTC+2 (CEST)

Galečić is a village in the Municipality of Tomislavgrad in Canton 10 of the Federation of Bosnia and Herzegovina, an entity of Bosnia and Herzegovina. The village is located on the hill in the upper part of Šujica Valley.

In close proximity of the village is an old Ottoman bridge over the Šuica river, Galečka Ćuprija, situated in the heart of the Šuica Valley.

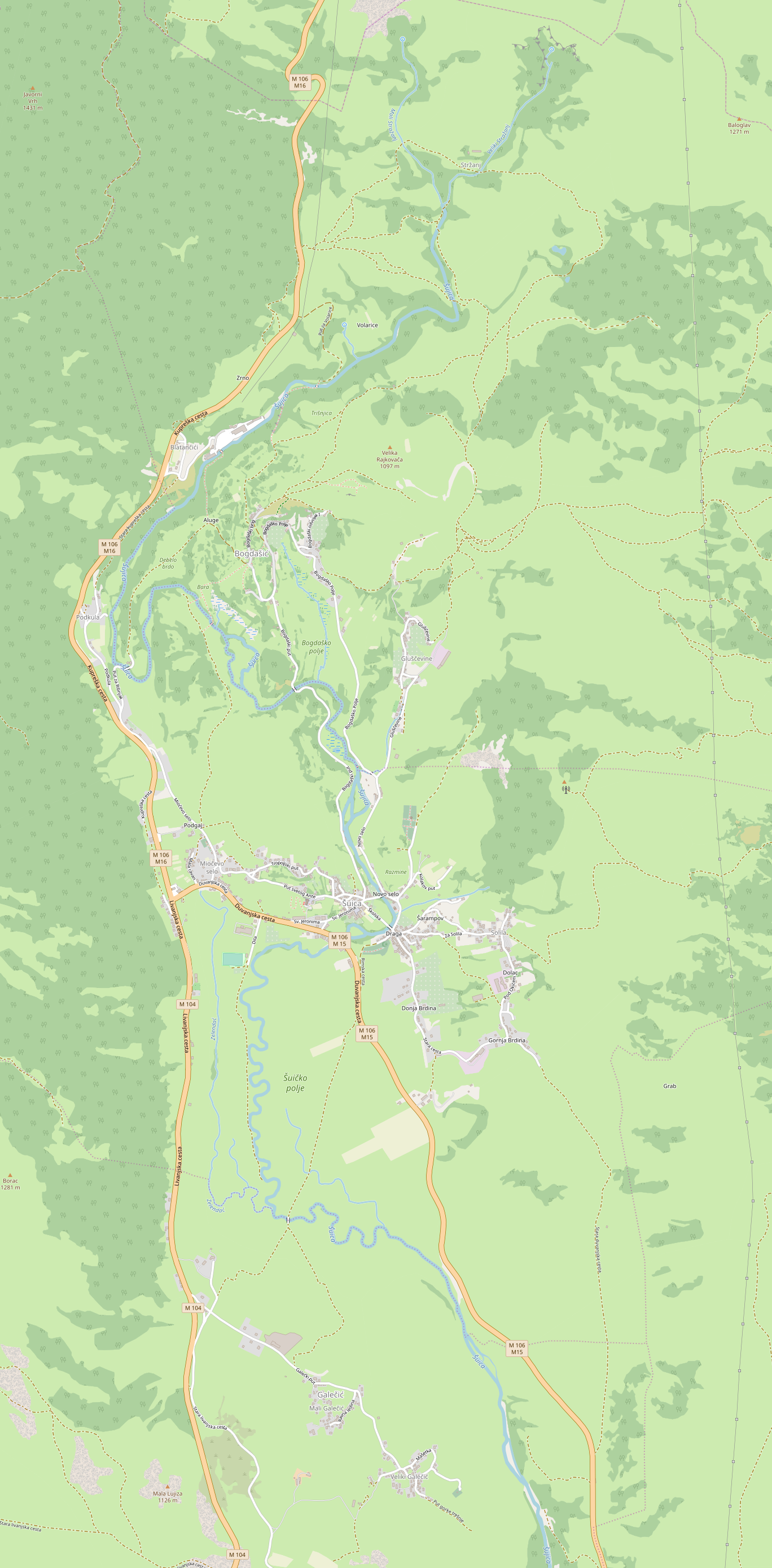
Šuica Valley map, with the river cutting right through the middle.

== Demographics ==
According to the 2013 census, its population was 279, all Croats.

== Bibliography ==
- Ethnicity/National Affiliation, Religion and Mother Tongue (PDF). Sarajevo: Agency for Statistics of Bosnia and Herzegovina. 2019.
