= Galečka Ćuprija =

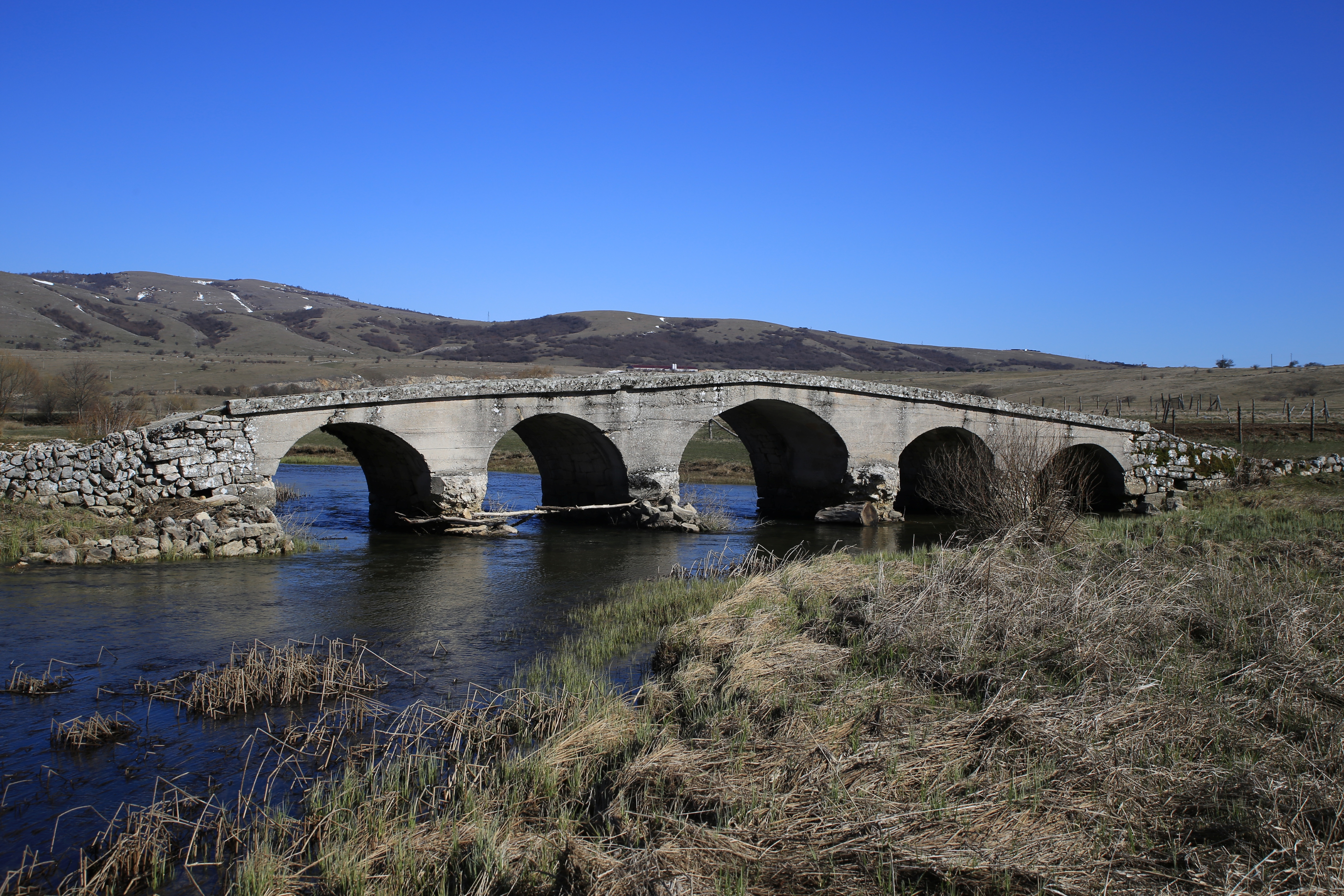
- Galečka Ćuprija over the Šuica river in Duvanjsko Polje
- Coordinates: 43.822881°N 17.182657°E
- Carries: Pedestrian
- Crosses: Šuica
- Locale: Galečić, Šuica Valley
- Other name(s): Roman bridge, Ottoman bridge

Characteristics
- Material: Stone, later repairs with cement mortar
- No. of spans: 5
- Piers in water: 4

History
- Architect: Uncertain
- Constructed by: Uncertain
- Construction start: Uncertain
- Construction end: Uncertain

Location
- Interactive map of Galečka Ćuprija

Galečka Ćuprija is a stone bridge over the sinking river Šuica, near the village of Galečić, in the heart of the Šuica Valley, which is in the northwestern part of Duvanjsko Polje, in Bosnia and Herzegovina.

== See also ==
- Šuica
- List of bridges in Bosnia and Herzegovina
