= Bogdašić =

- Village
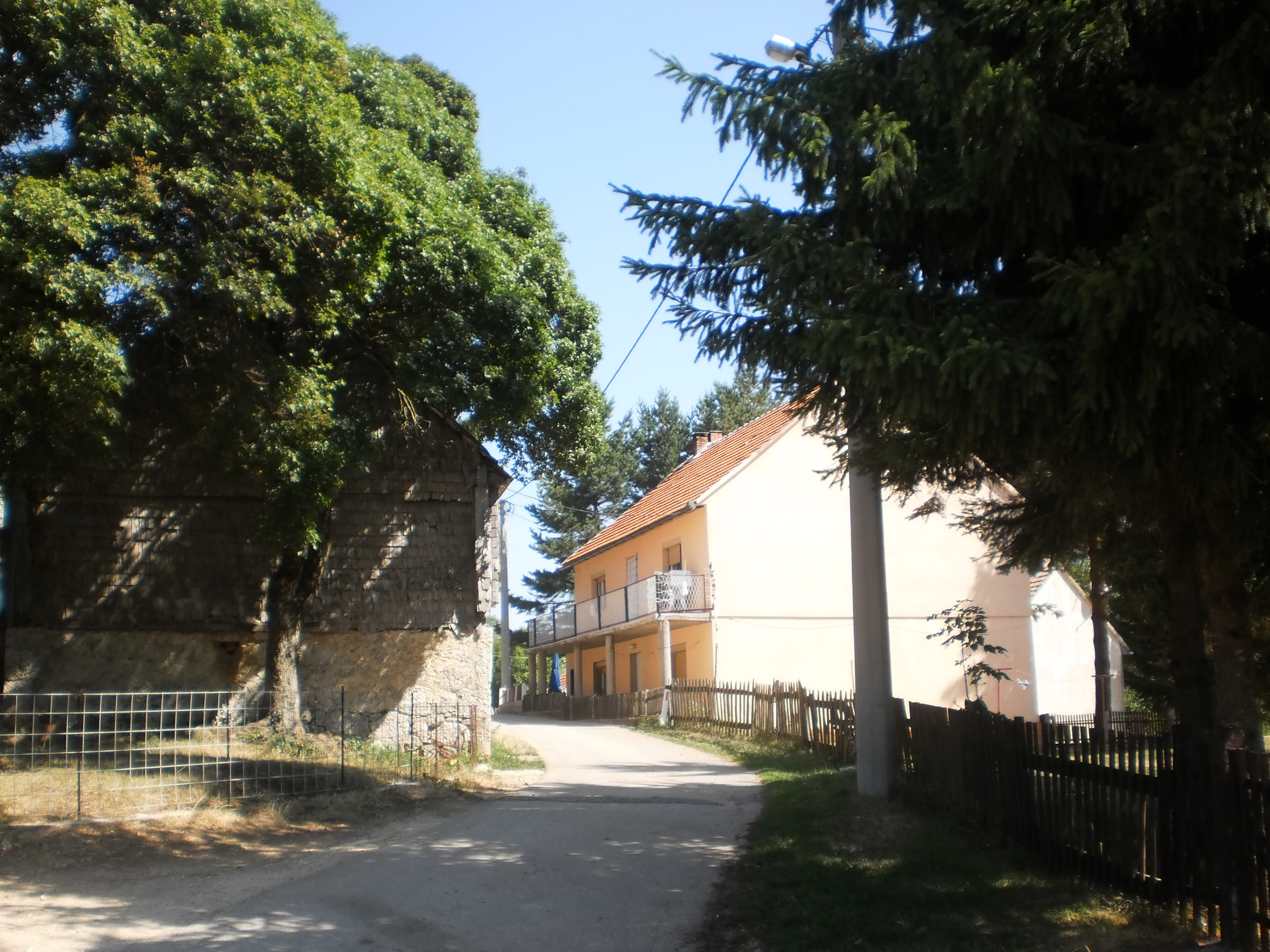

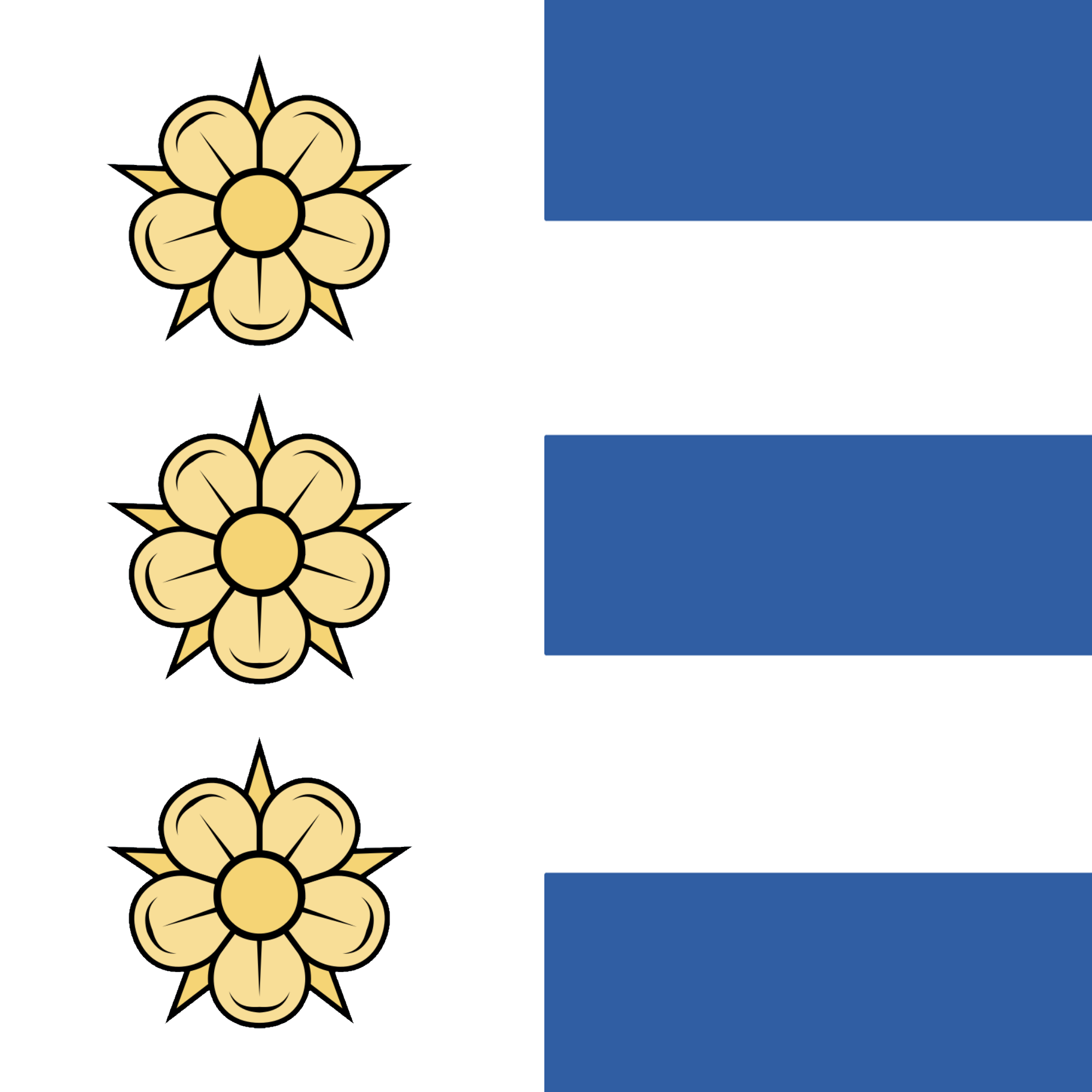
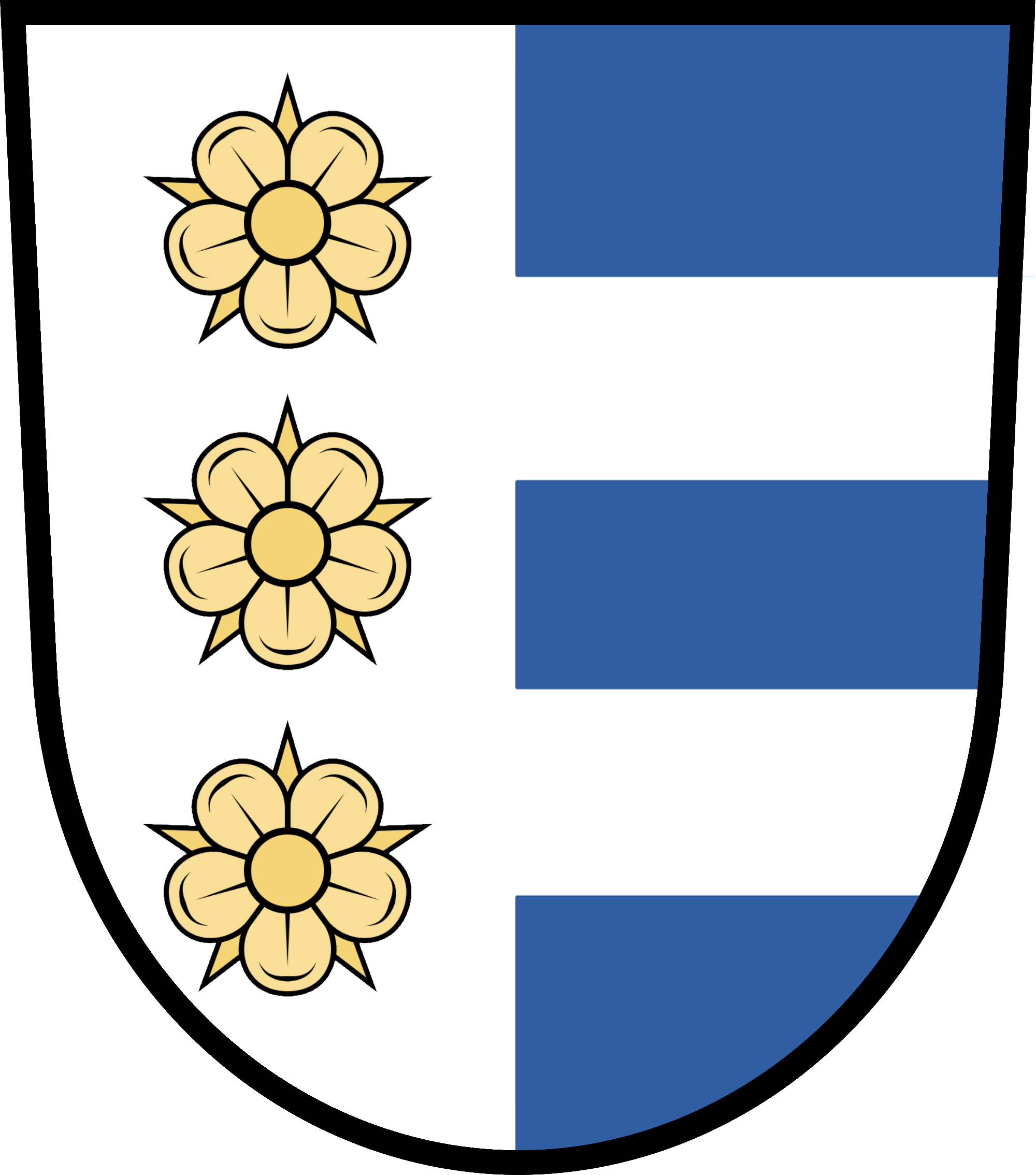
- Flag Seal

- Location within Bosnia and Herzegovina
- Coordinates: 43°51′27″N 17°11′03″E
- Country: Bosnia and Herzegovina
- Entity: Federation of Bosnia and Herzegovina
- Canton: Canton 10
- Municipality: Tomislavgrad

Area
  - Total: 20.59 km^{2} (7.95 sq mi)

Population (2013)
  - Total: 346
  - Density: 16.8/km^{2} (43.5/sq mi)
- Time zone: UTC+1 (CET)
  - Summer (DST): UTC+2 (CEST)

Bogdašić is a village in the Municipality of Tomislavgrad in Canton 10 of the Federation of Bosnia and Herzegovina, an entity of Bosnia and Herzegovina. The village is located on the hill in the upper part of Šujica Valley.

== Demographics ==
404 residents lived in the village in 1991. By 2013 that number decreased to 346. All residents identified themselves as Croats.

== Bibliography ==
- Ethnicity/National Affiliation, Religion and Mother Tongue (PDF). Sarajevo: Agency for Statistics of Bosnia and Herzegovina. 2019.
