= Šuica (river) =

Šuica Šujica
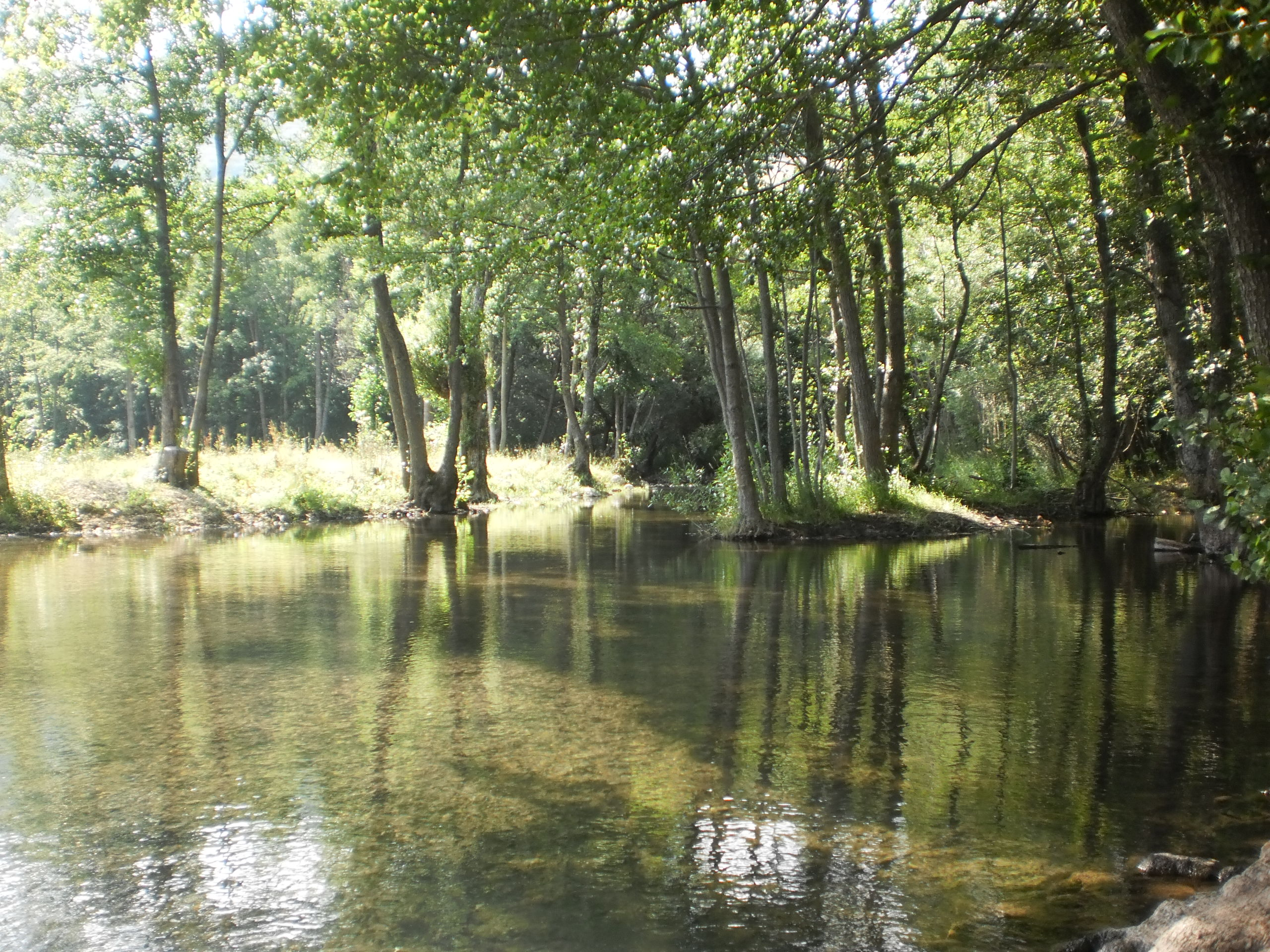
- Šuica

- Location within Bosnia and Herzegovina

Location
- State: Bosnia and Herzegovina
- Municipality: Kupres, Tomislavgrad
- Region: Tropolje
- Settlements: Šuica, Mokronoge, Letka, Kovači

Physical characteristics
- Source: Stržanj Mali
  - location: Šuica
  - coordinates: 43.882204°N 17.190529°E
  - elevation: 1060 a.s.l.
- 2nd source: Stržanj Veliki
  - location: Šuica
  - coordinates: 43.880982°N 17.201129°E
  - elevation: 1060 a.s.l.
- Mouth
  - location: Buško Blato, Prisoje, Bosnia and Herzegovina
  - coordinates: 43.676135°N 17.186949°E
  - elevation: 700 a.s.l.
- Length: 48.5 km (30.1 mi)
- Basin size: 730 km2

Basin features
- River system: Cetina
- Waterbodies: Buško Blato
- Bridges: Galečka Ćuprija - stone Ottoman bridge over the Šuica

The Šuica (Cyrillic: Шуица) which is known as the Šujica (Шујица), is a sinking river flowing through Duvanjsko Polje and the wider region of Tropolje in Bosnia and Herzegovina. The river also runs through its subterranean section, which begins at the point where river goes underground within the main estavelle (ponor) at Kovači. This section of the Šuica is traversable for trained speleologists with proper equipment.

Its sources are Mali Stržanj and Veliki Stržanj, both close to village of Stržanj. It flows through and drains most of its waters from Kupreško Polje, the Šuica Valley and Duvanjsko Polje. The river disappears underground in large Kovači estavelle, eponymous of nearby village Kovači, in southwestern corner of Duvanjsko Polje. Waters of the Šuica than partially re-emerges at the source of Ričina in village Prisoje, which than empties into the reservoir of Buško Blato after a short flow of cca 0–50 meters, depending on the water levels in reservoir.

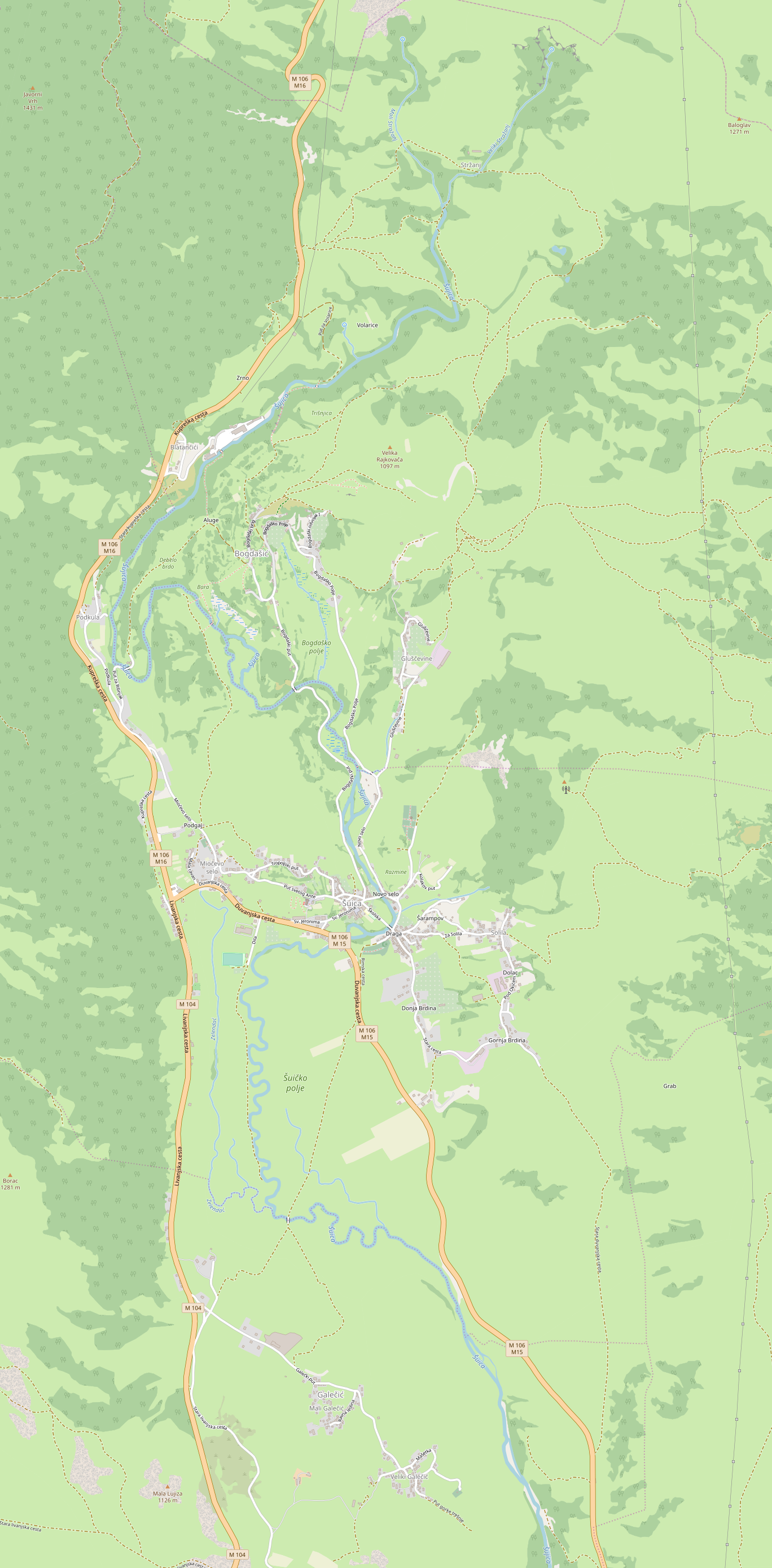
Šuica Valley map, with the river cutting right through the middle.

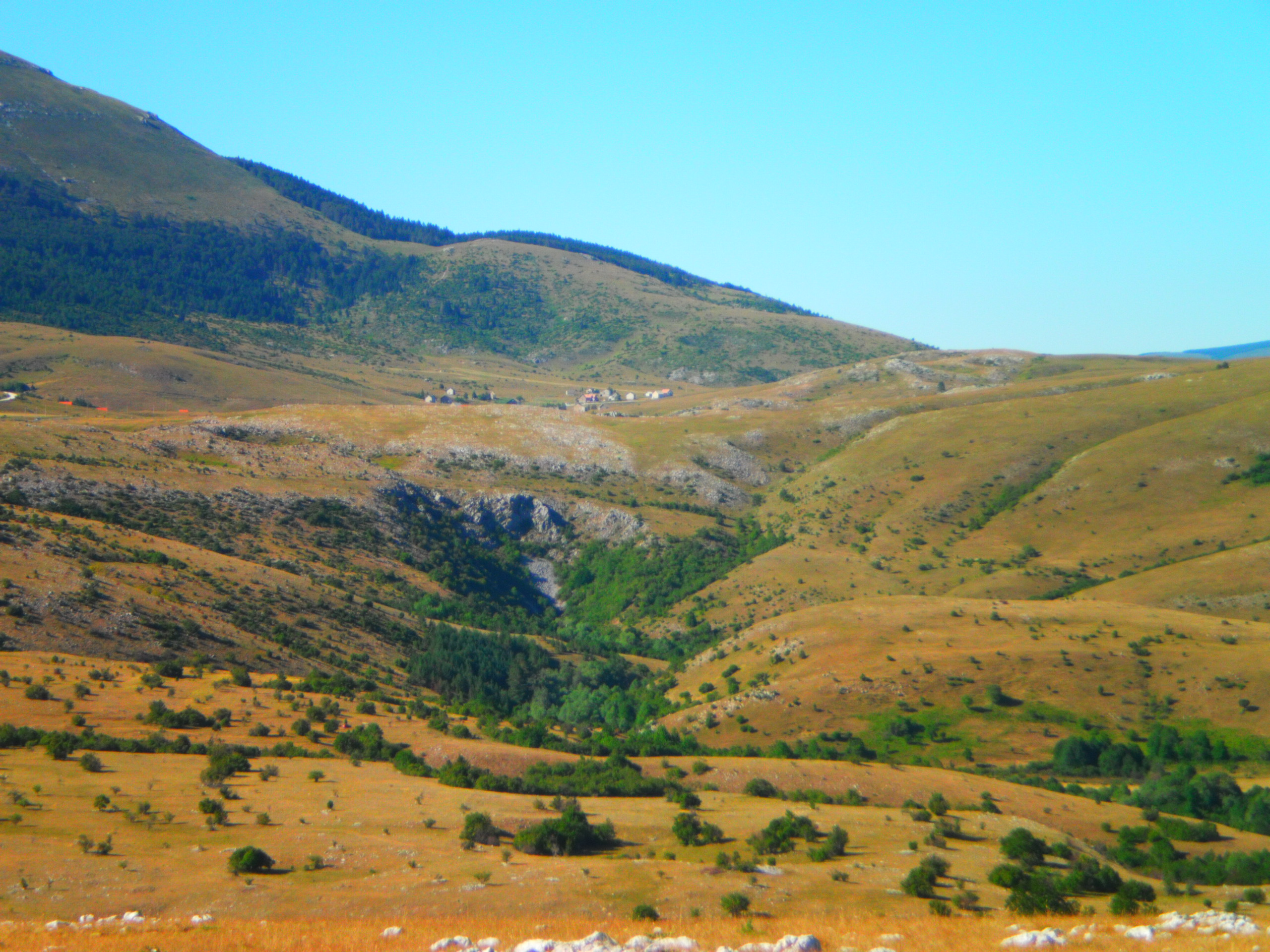
Mali Stržanj, right source of the Šuica

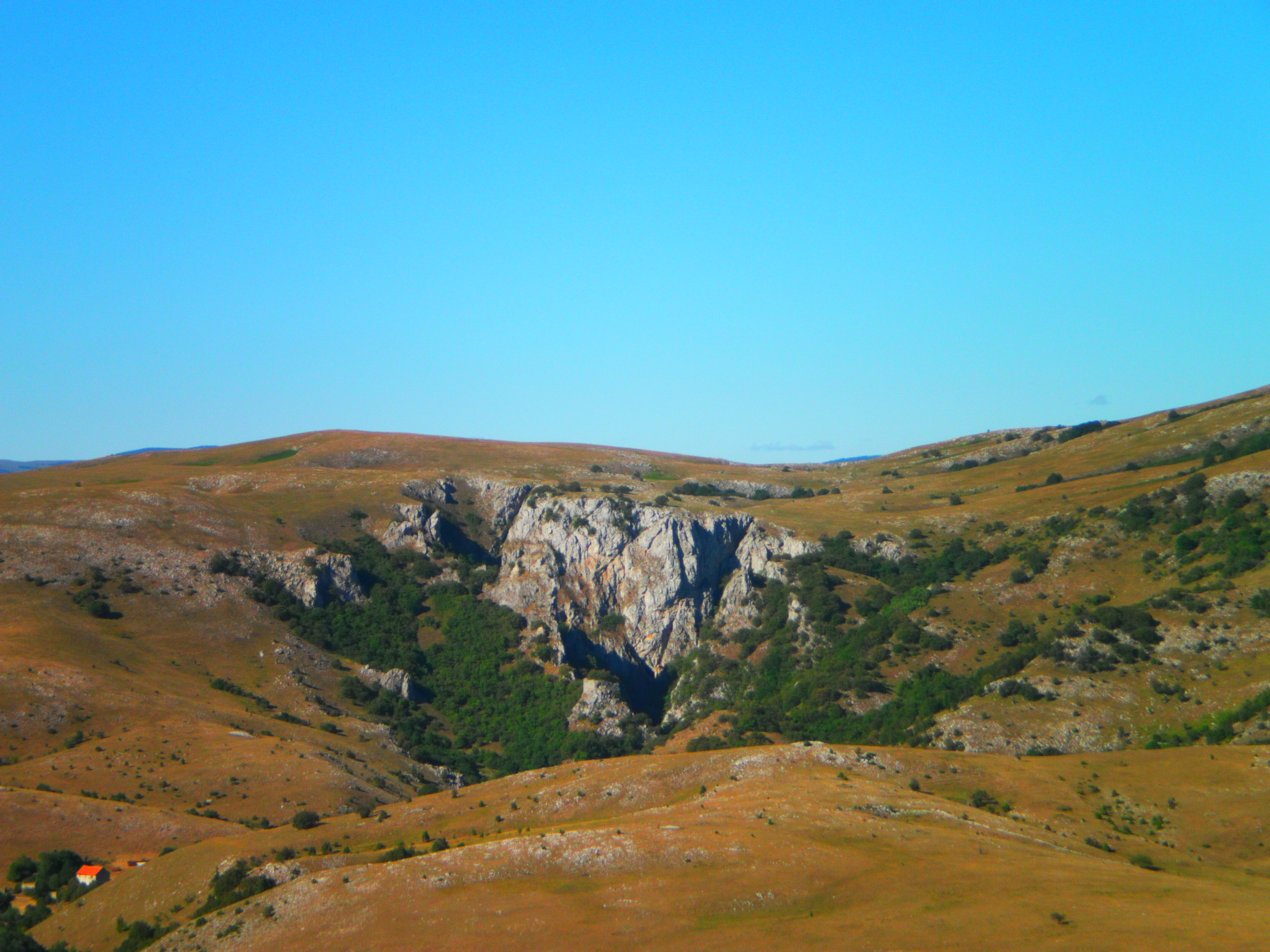
Veliki Stržanj, left source of the Šuica

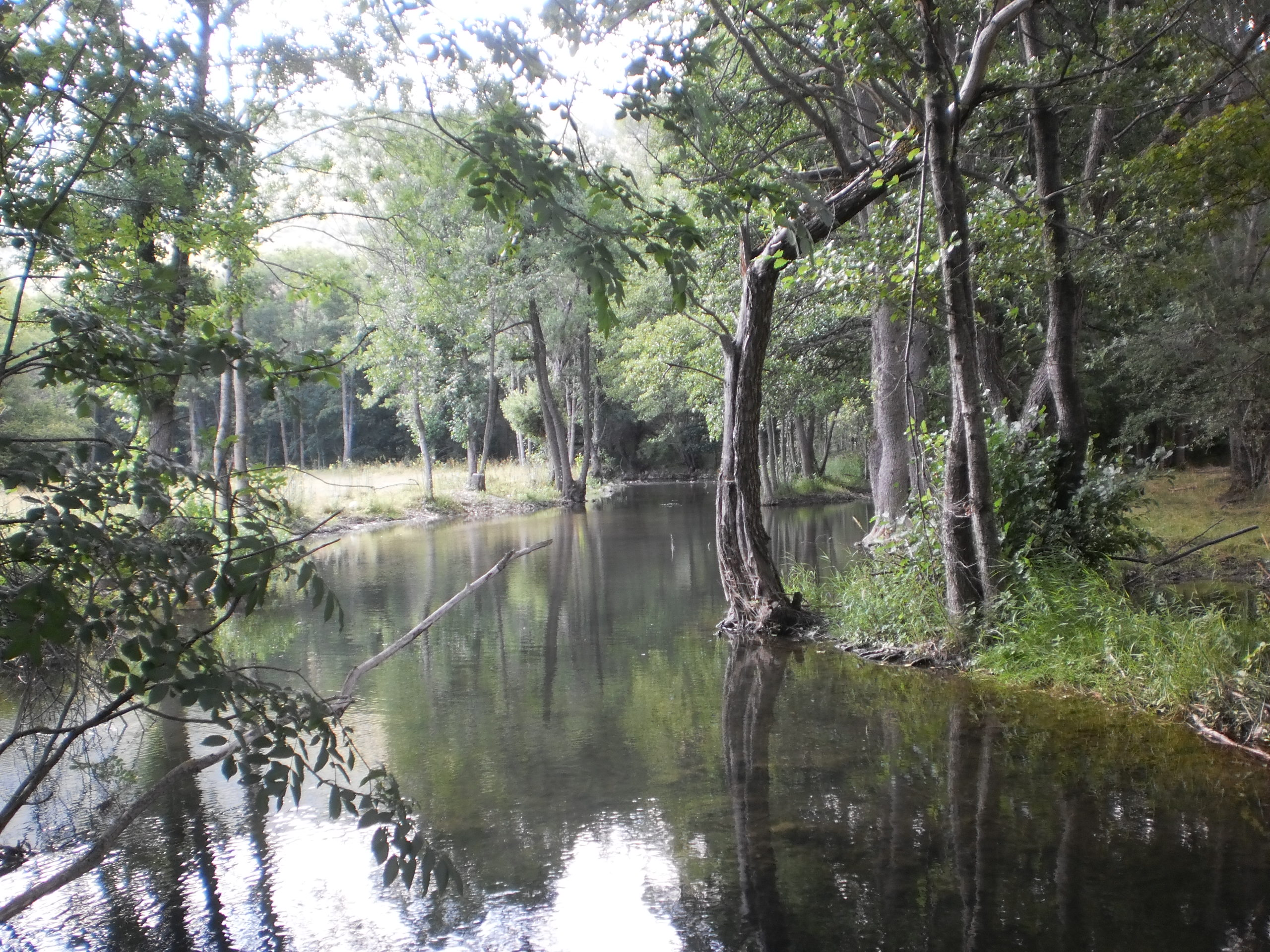
Šuica flowing through the woods

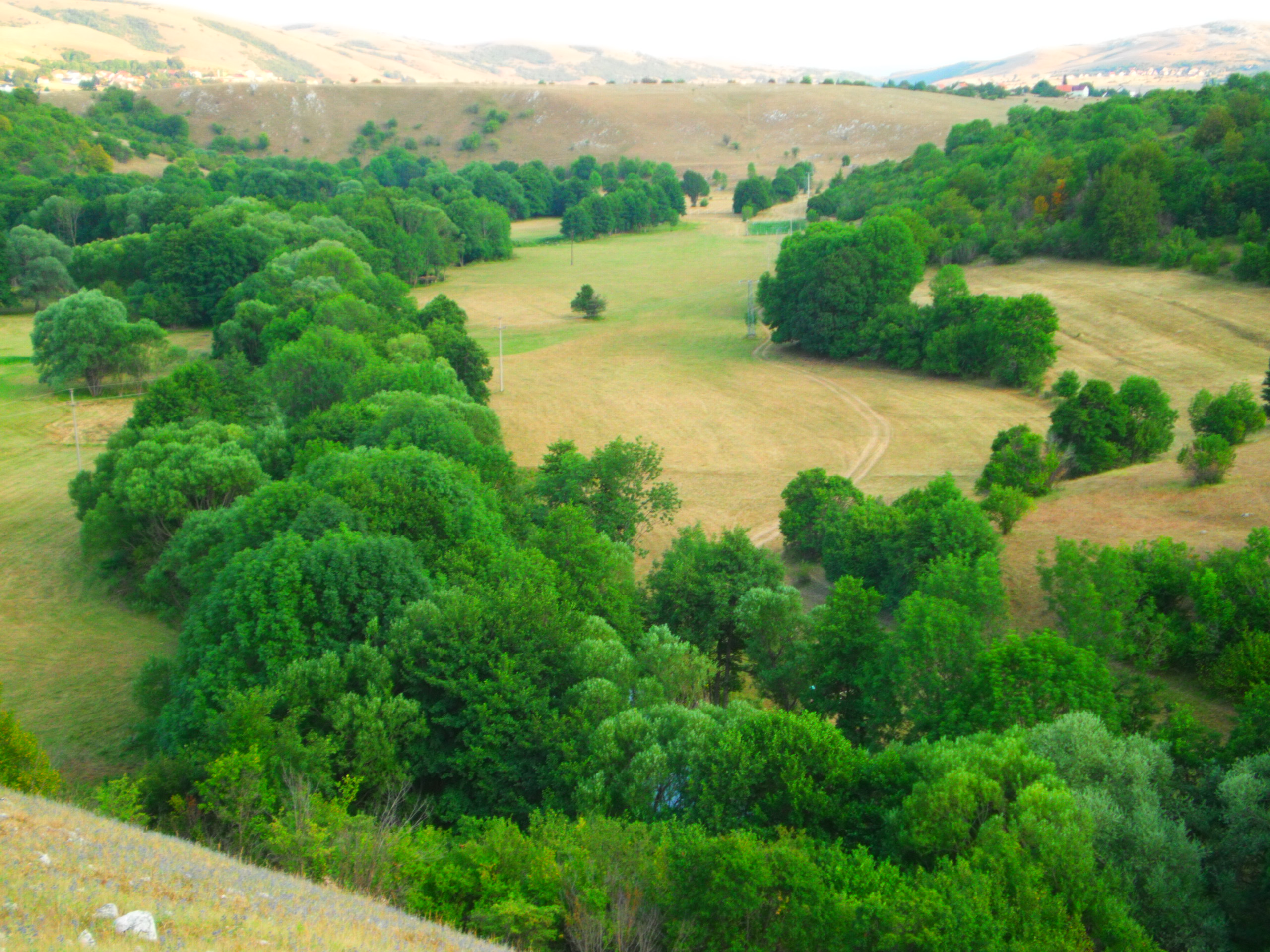
Šuica Valley

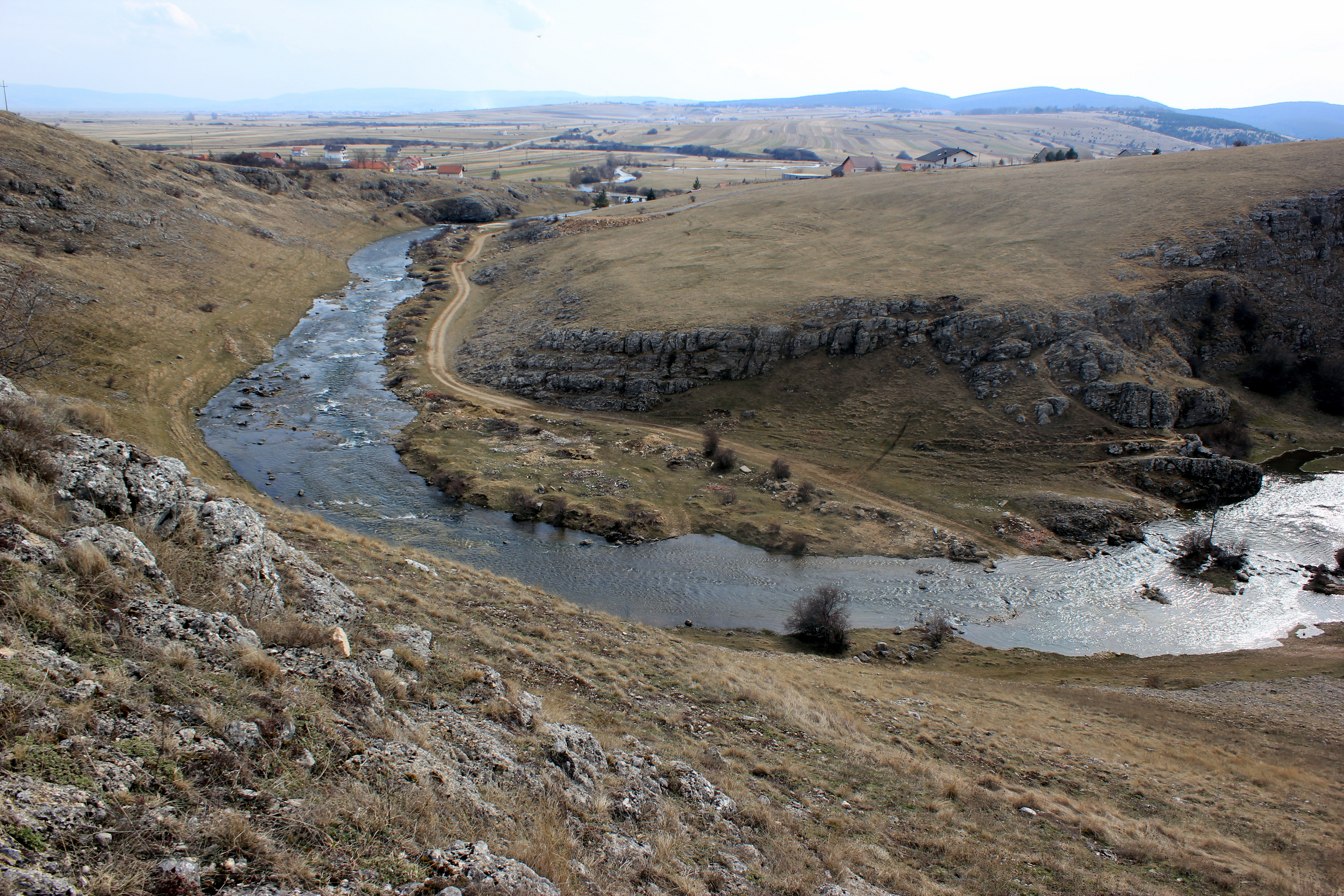
Šuica Canyon

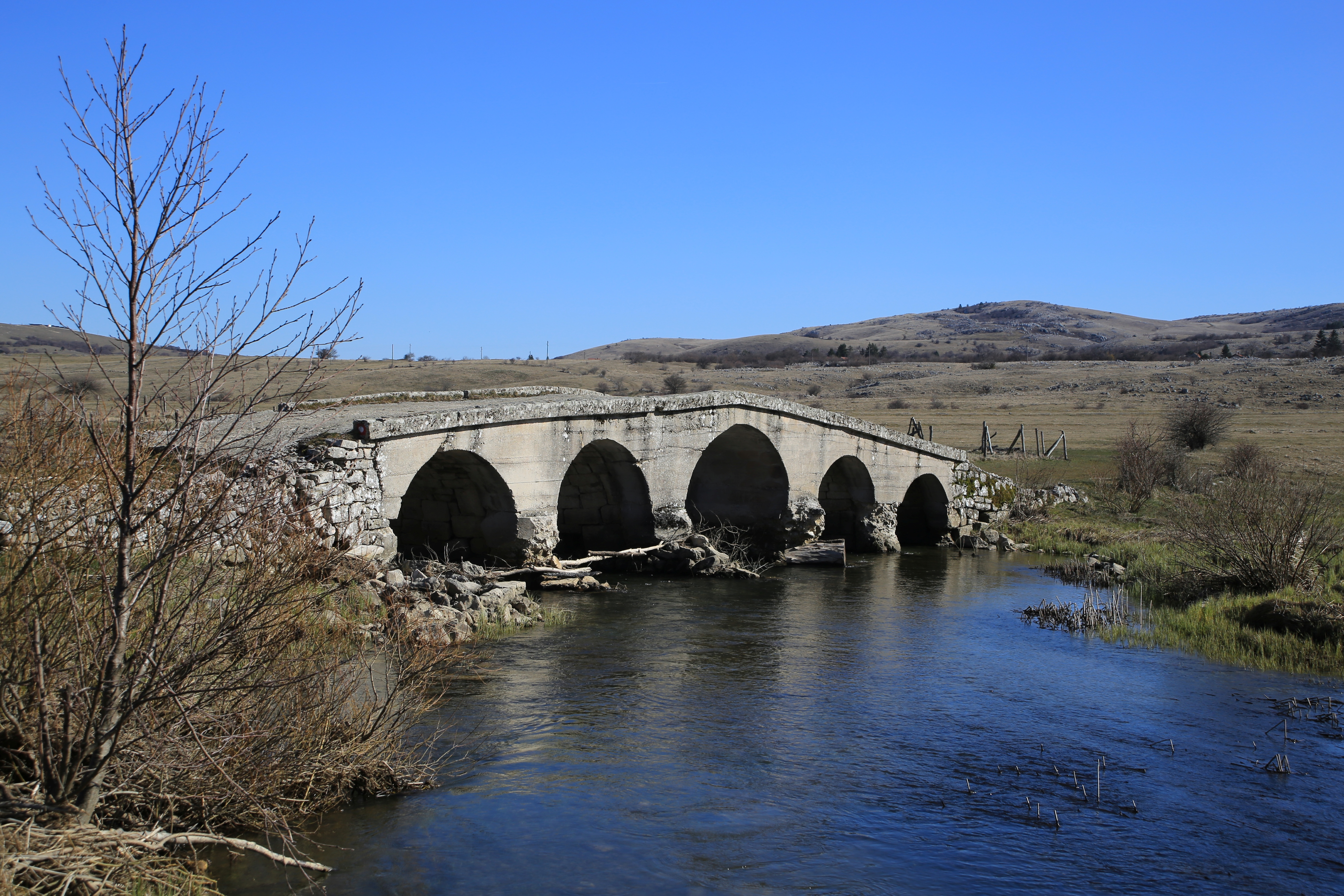
Old bridge over the Šuica near Galečić village, a.k.a. Galečka Ćuprija
