= Šujica, Dobrova–Polhov Gradec =

Šujica
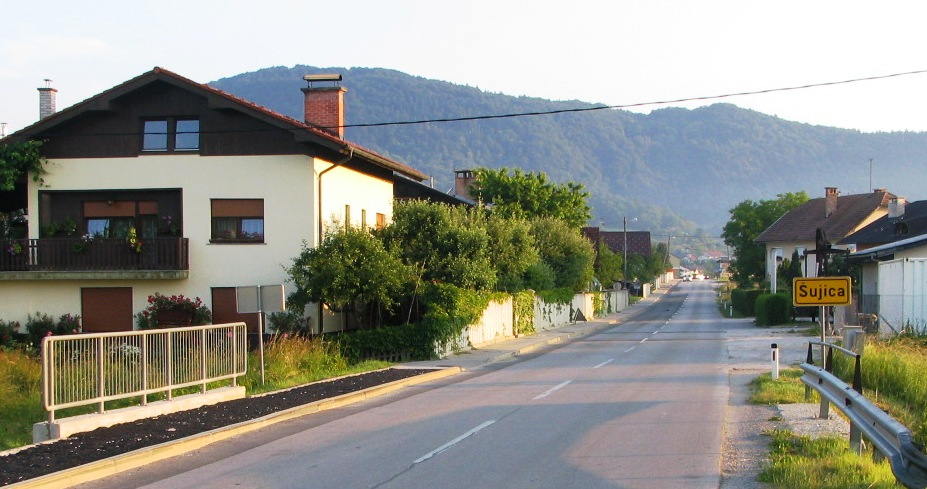

- Location in Slovenia
- Coordinates: 46°3′41.01″N 14°24′45.19″E
- Country: Slovenia
- Traditional region: Upper Carniola
- Statistical region: Central Slovenia
- Municipality: Dobrova–Polhov Gradec

Area
  - Total: 2.7 km^{2} (1.0 sq mi)
- Elevation: 312.5 m (1,025 ft)

Population (2020)
  - Total: 534
  - Density: 200/km^{2} (510/sq mi)

Šujica (pronounced [ˈʃuːjitsa]; German: Schuitze) is a clustered village on the left bank of the Gradaščica River, 1 km north of Dobrova in the Municipality of Dobrova–Polhov Gradec in the Upper Carniola region of Slovenia.

== Name ==
Šujica was first mentioned in written records between 1197 and 1202 as Sůz, and later in 1267 as in Scheuz and in 1354 as in der Schewez. It is also known locally and in older written sources as Švica. It shares its name with Šujica Creek, a left tributary of the Gradaščica River. The name of the settlement is based on the hydronym and is derived from the Slovene word šuj 'left' (cf. šujica 'left hand'), and therefore means 'left tributary (of the Gradaščica)'. In the past it was known as Schuitze in German.

== Notable people ==
Notable people that were born or lived in Šujica include:

- Ivan Dolničar (1921–2011), a.k.a. Janošik, Partisan and communist politician
- Vladimir "Lado" Dolničar (1919–2011), a.k.a. Rudi, People's Hero of Yugoslavia and Partisan

== Gallery ==
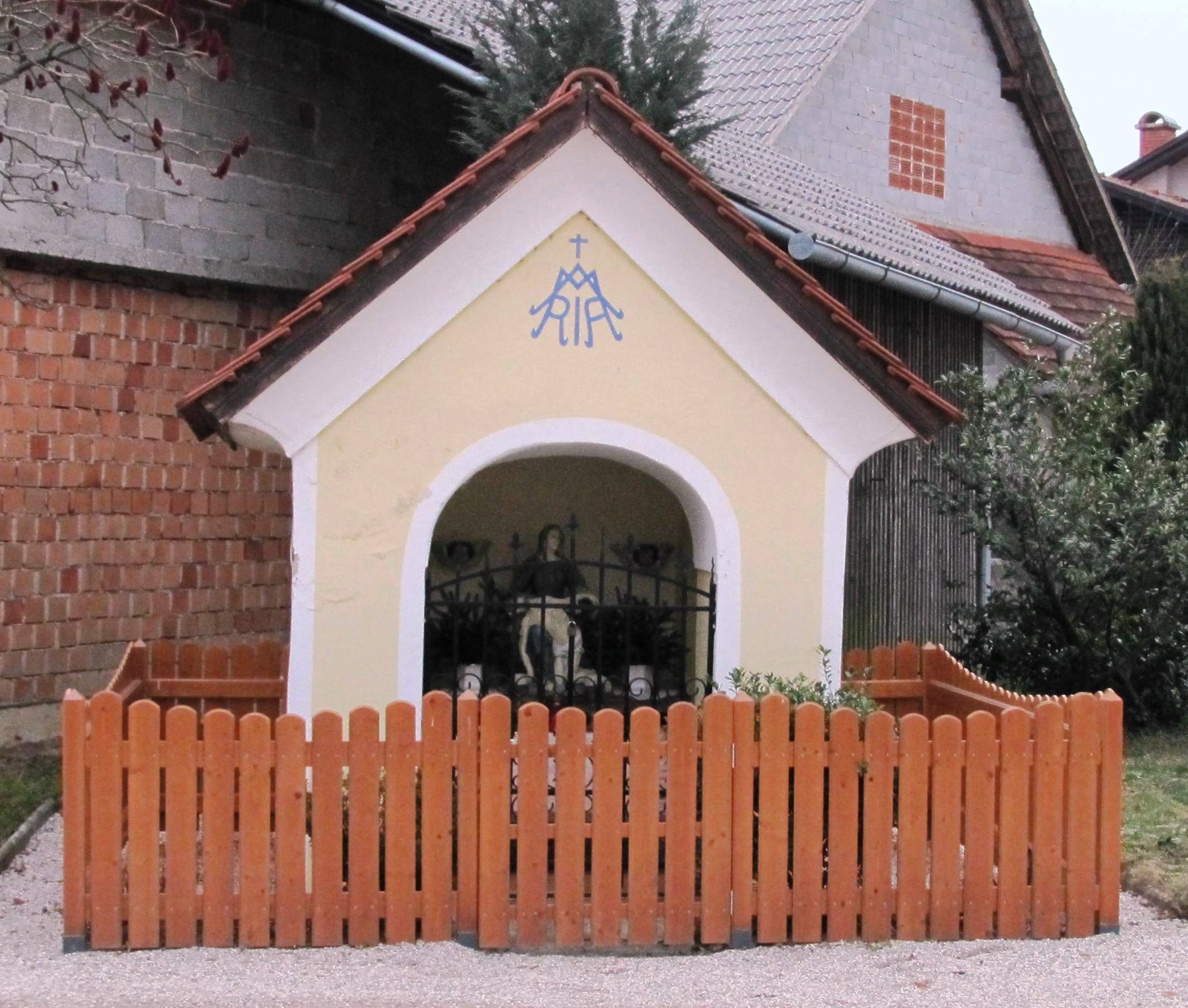
Pietà shrine in the village center of Šujica
