= Šujica, Tomislavgrad =

Šujica
- Village
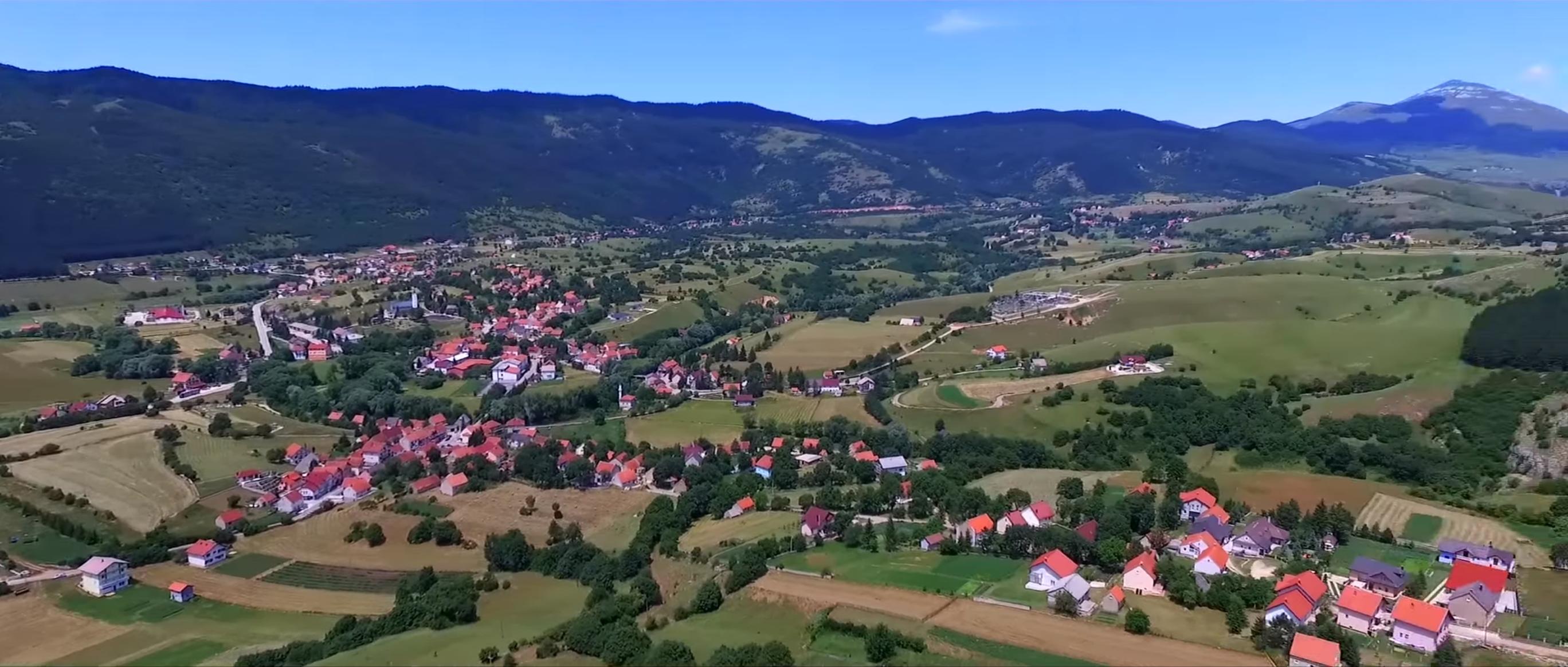
- Šuica

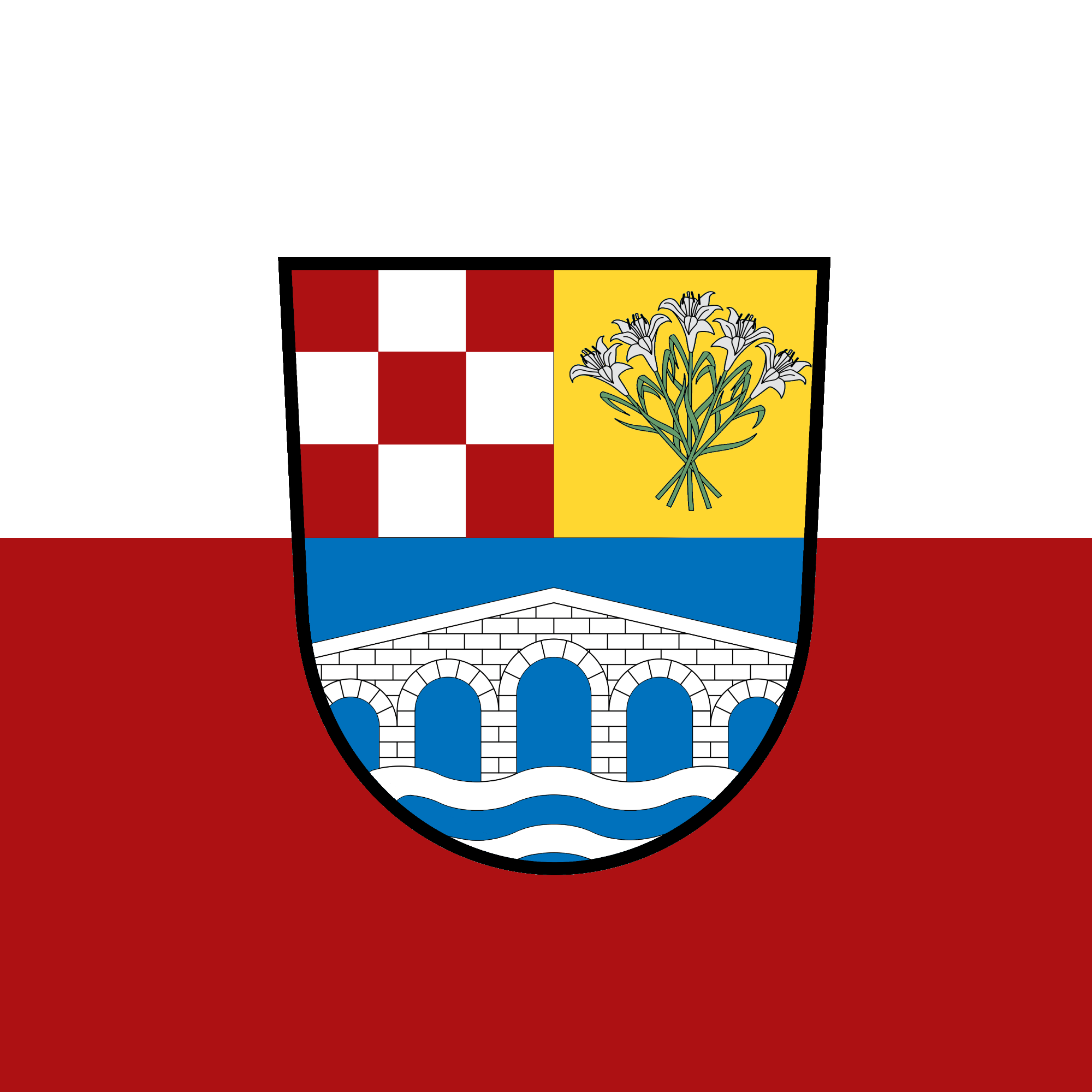
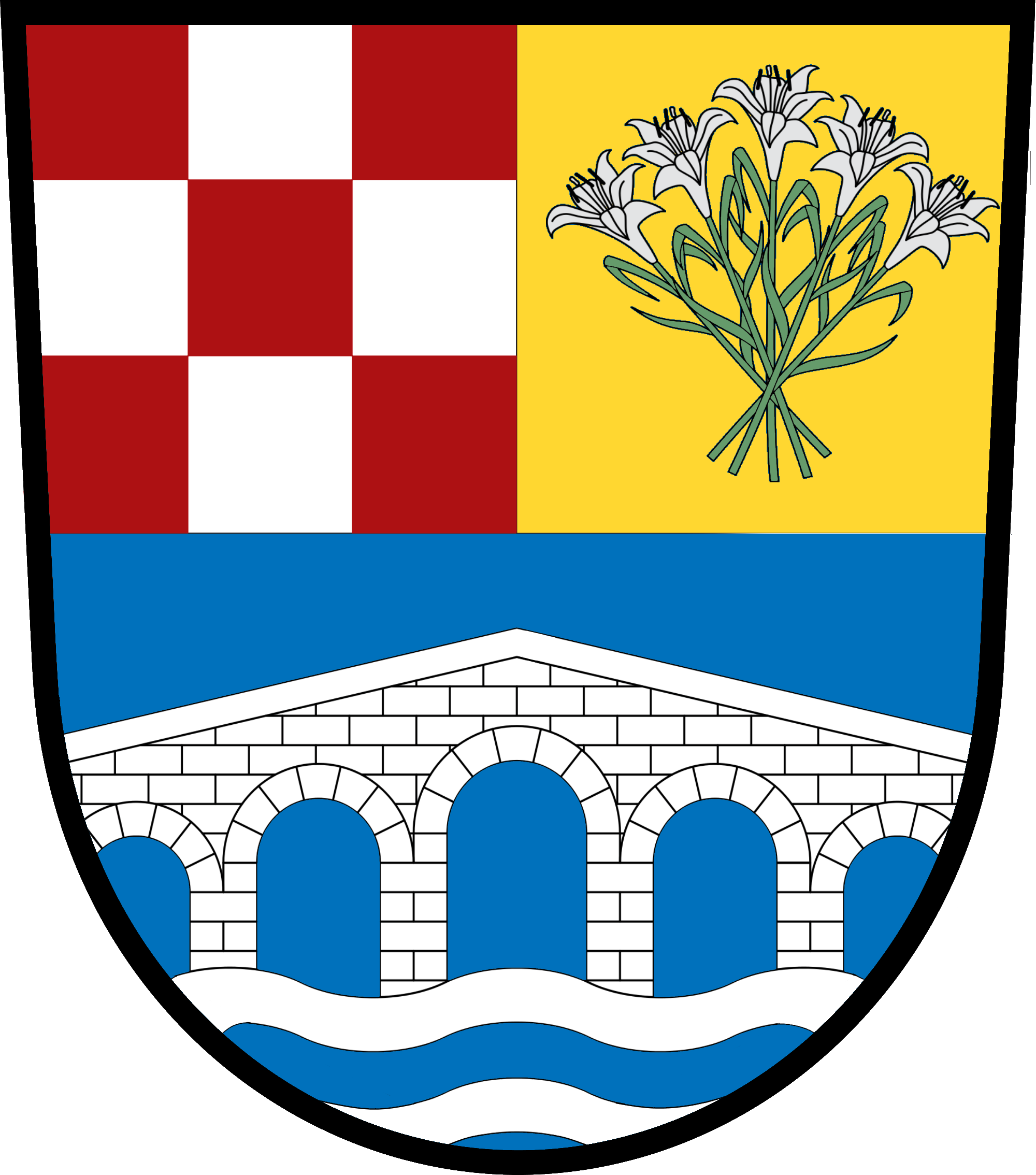
- Flag Coat of arms

- Šujica within Bosnia and Herzegovina
- Coordinates: 43°50′19″N 17°11′02″E
- Country: Bosnia and Herzegovina
- Entity: Federation of Bosnia and Herzegovina
- Canton: Canton 10
- Municipality: Tomislavgrad

Area
  - Total: 24.73 km^{2} (9.55 sq mi)
- Elevation: 925 m (3,035 ft)

Population (2013)
  - Total: 1,758
  - Density: 71.09/km^{2} (184.1/sq mi)
- Time zone: UTC+1 (CET)
  - Summer (DST): UTC+2 (CEST)
- Postal code: 80249

Šuica (pronounced [ˈʃuːitsa]) (or Šujica (pronounced [ˈʃuːjitsa])) is a village in the Municipality of Tomislavgrad in Canton 10 of the Federation of Bosnia and Herzegovina, an entity of Bosnia and Herzegovina.

The village is named after the river Šuica. The very name signifies not only the settlement but also the area of Šuica Valley around the upper course of the river where there are several villages situated at the crossroads of Bosnia, Dalmatia and Herzegovina.

In this article, the name "Šuica" is used for the whole area of the Šuica Valley. The citations referring to the central village of the Valley will be noted as "Šuica (village)".

== History ==
Area of the Šujica Valley was inhabited at least since the time of the Illyrians. Among the few remains of the Illyrian tribe Delmatae there are several tombs. More archaeological remains date from the time of Roman rule in this area. Through the Valley passed the Roman trade and military road connecting the cities of Salona and Servitium. It passed east of the river Šujica source in Stržanj where a fortress that served as a watchtower was located.

During the Middle Ages, Šuica was mostly part of the Kingdom of Croatia and partly part of the Bosnian Kingdom. The Ottoman Empire conquered Šuica at the beginning of the 16th century.

The name of Šuica was first mentioned in 1516 in the Ottoman census of taxpayers as a settlement in nahiye Kupres in the kadiluk of Neretva. The census mentions the village Šuica with seven Christian houses. Fifteen years later, the second list mentions 34 residents of Šuica who serve as guardians of the gorge (probably Stržanj) and were thus exempt from all taxes except the one for cereals.

In 1550, it was noted that the Venetian ambassador Catarino Zeno who was on his way to Istanbul, stayed in Svizza, in a very comfortable guesthouse.

The writer Evlija Čelebi described Šujica in 1660 as a small village on a spacious and fertile land. He described the population of the village as very boldly and courageous.

Bishop Pavo Dragicevic who was on a pastoral visit to the extinct Diocese of Duvno in 1741 and 1742, registered 5 houses and 46 residents in Suiza, while in 1768 bishop Marijan Bogdanović registered 14 houses and 161 residents. The Schematism of the Herzegovinian Franciscan Province from 1867 noted that on the area called Šujica, there was a village Šujica with 250 inhabitants, village Bogdašić with 108, village Malovan with 28, village Rilić with 221, Šarampov with 221, Baljci with 23 and Galečić with 25.

In 1878 with the Congress of Berlin, Bosnia and Herzegovina, including Šuica came under the Austro-Hungarian rule. Complete annexation followed in 1908. Administratively Šuica was located in the Travnik District. In 1896 the elementary school was founded.

After the end of World War I and the dissolution of Austria-Hungary, the province of Bosnia and Herzegovina, along with Šuica, became a part of the State of Slovenes, Croats and Serbs and soon thereafter Kingdom of Serbs, Croats and Slovenes. After the Vidovdan Constitution of 1921 established a new administrative division town became part of Travnik County. The country changed its name to the Kingdom of Yugoslavia in 1929, and the Šuica became part of a new administrative unit, Littoral Banovina. In 1939, the Littoral Banovina was merged with the Sava Banovina and parts of neighbouring provinces to create the Banovina of Croatia. After the Second World War, Šuica became part of the Socialist Republic of Bosnia and Herzegovina.

On 9 May 1991, while a War of Independence took place in Croatia and the situation in Bosnia and Herzegovina between different ethnic groups became more and more intense, the population of Šuica blocked the road and stopped entering of the tanks of the Yugoslav Army in Livno.

During the Bosnian War, Šuica was on the battlefront. The Yugoslav Army and the Army of Republika Srpska were in the north, while in Šuica there were Croatian forces that prevented the penetration of the Yugoslavian and Serbian armies towards Livno, Split and the Dalmatian coast. During the War, many houses were either destroyed or burnt.

== Geography ==
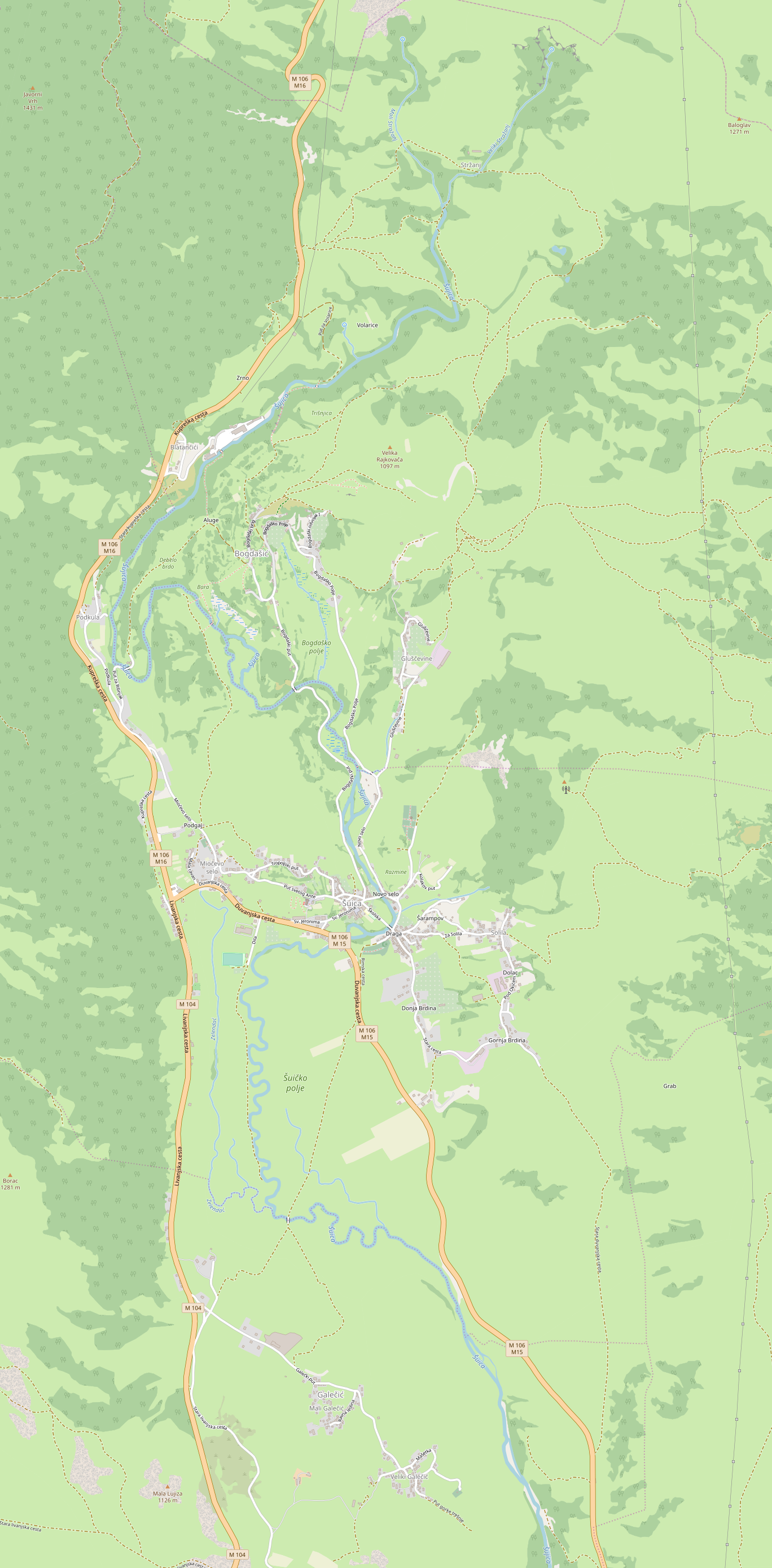
Map of the Šujica Valley

== Administration ==
The administrative unit named Local Community of Šujica (Croatian:Mjesna zajednica Šuijca) roughly covers the whole area of Šuica Valley. This includes three main settlements: Šuica (village), Bogdašić and Galečić. The local community of Šujica is one of 29 local communities of the municipality of Tomislavgrad in the Canton 10.

== Population ==
The population of Šuica (village) was as follows:

Šuica (village)
year of census	2013.	1991.	1981.	1971.
Croats	1.668 (94,90%)	1.313 (90,80%)	1.345 (90,81%)	1.365 (90,87%)
Bosniaks	84 (4,80%)	119 (8,22%)	123 (8,30%)	121 (8,05%)
Serbs	2 (0,1%)	2 (0,13%)	3 (0,20%)	12 (0,79%)
Yugoslavs		3 (0,20%)	6 (0,40%)	0
others and unknown	3 (0,2%)	9 (0,62%)	4 (0,27%)	4 (0,26%)
Total	1.758	1.446	1.481	1.502

== Sites ==
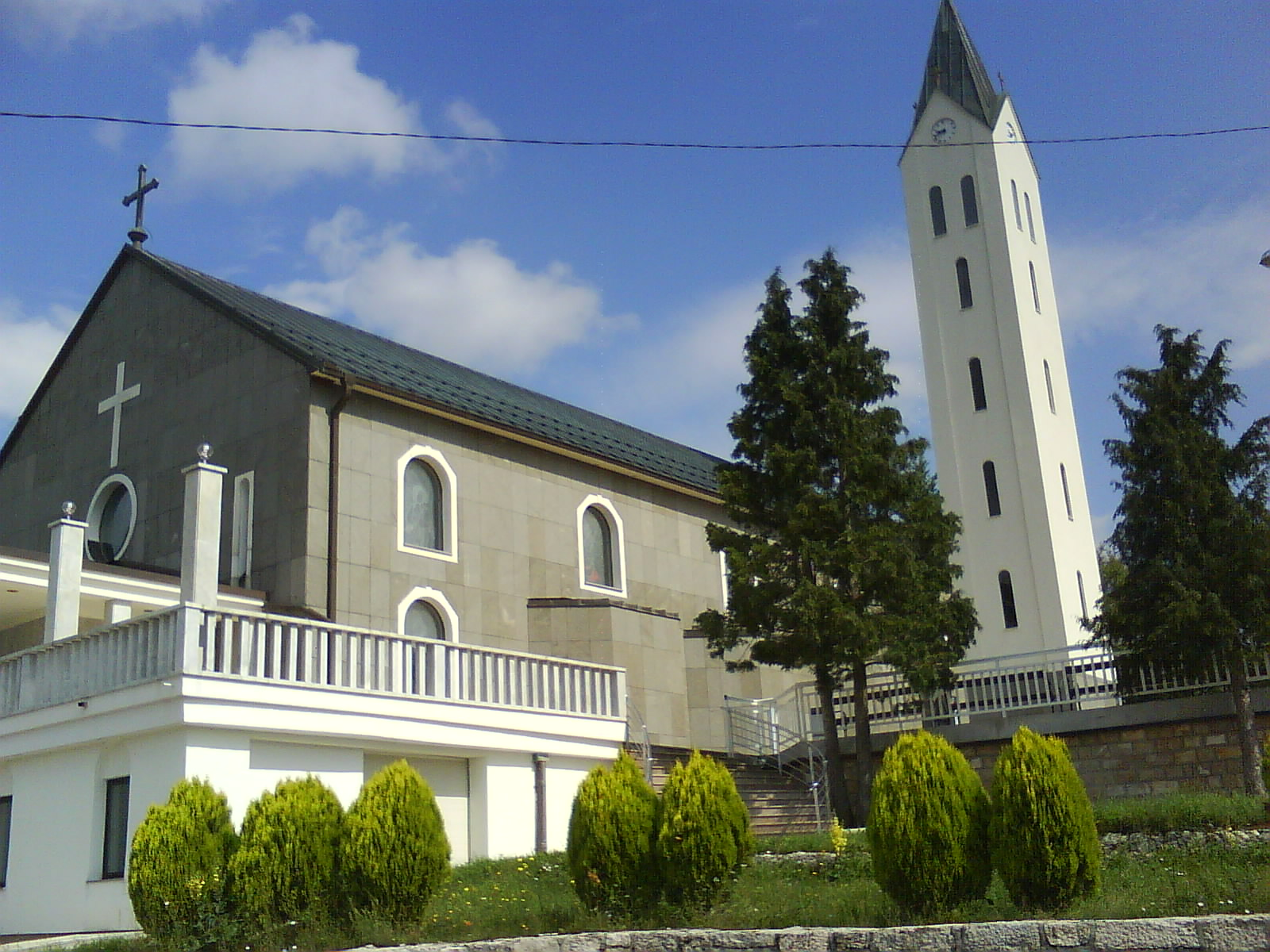
Church of saint Anthony

In the plain Bara (Marsh) below the hill on which the village Bogdašić is located, lies unexplored the archaeological site Crkvine. The name (Croatian word crkva means church) indicates that there are remains of the church. The remains were further damaged because the area is not protected and because in the past the people took and used the stones from the site.

Among the significant buildings in the village is Catholic church of saint Anthony of Padua. The original church was built of stone in 1872, eight years after the establishment of the parish based in Šujica. The bell tower of the church was built in 1962. In 1969 the old church was razed to the ground and then new one was built which still exists.

== Sport ==
In the local community exists a football club Šujica (Croatian: Nogometni klub Šujica), founded on 16 October 1972. It competes in the inter-cantonal league of Canton 10 and West Herzegovina Canton.

In 2008 the taekwondo club Šujica was founded.

=== Šuica Half Marathon ===
Šuica Half Marathon
- Date: August
- Location: Kupres, Šuica
- Event type: Road
- Distance: Half marathon
- Established: 2006; 20 years ago
- Course records: 1:09:46

The Šuica Half Marathon (Croatian: Šujički polumaraton) is an annual half marathon road running race. It starts in Kupres, passes through Kupres Plateau and finishes in the village of Šujica. The altitude of the Kupres Plateau that goes above 1000m and summer temperatures represent an additional challenge for runners. Among the known participants of this half marathon were Lisa Nemec, Đuro Kodžo, Milan Bandić and Marija Vrajić.

== Famous residents ==
- Ivić Pašalić

== See also ==
- Bogdašić
- Galečić
