= Jazovka =

Site of mass executions in Croatia

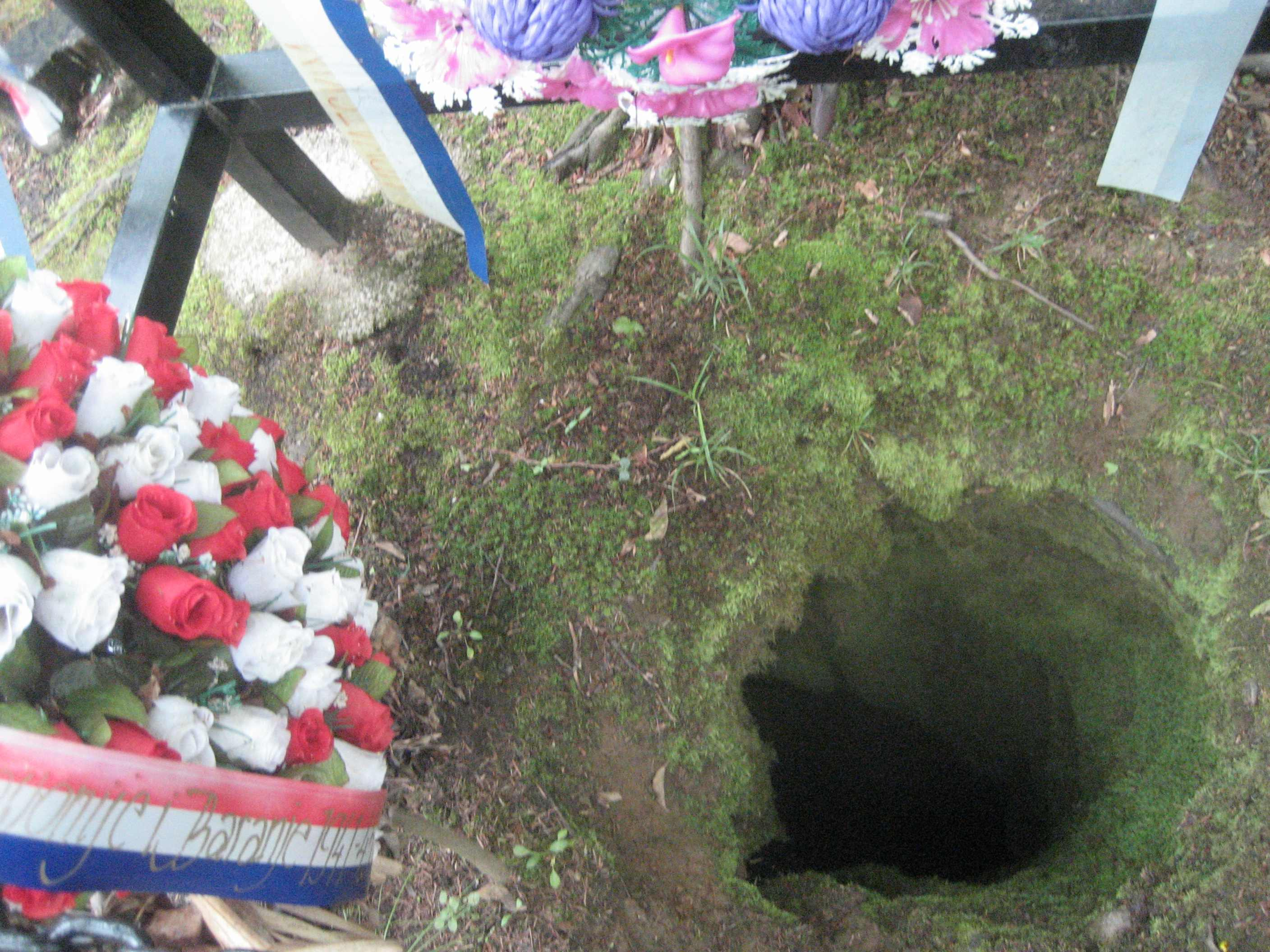
- Entrance

- Location within Croatia
- Interactive map of Jazovka
- Location: near Sošice on Žumberak, Zagreb County
- Coordinates: 45.756455°N 15.389330°E
- Depth: 42 metres (138 ft)
- Length: 56 metres (0.035 mi)
- Geology: Karst cave
- Entrances: 1

Jazovka is a pit in the Žumberak Mountains area of Croatia, known as a site of mass executions and burials associated with Partisan activities during and after World War II. Hundreds of wounded Croatian soldiers from Zagreb hospitals and civilians were dumped in the pit. Some were already dead, but others died of exposure and injuries. Since the site was rediscovered in 1990, when more 800 skeletons were found, an annual pilgrimage has been organized.

== History ==
The first victims are believed to have been soldiers of the fascist puppet state Independent State of Croatia, captured by Partisan forces after a battle near Krašić in January 1943. Some were likely shot before being dumped into the pit; others might have been thrown in alive.

Later in 1945 the Partisans used the pit to dispose secretly of bodies of prisoners of war following the Bleiburg repatriations. They also dumped wounded Croatian soldiers, medical staff, and Catholic nuns.

While local people retained the memory of these events, the communist government suppressed any acknowledgement of these wartime murders by the Partisans. In 1990, after the fall of socialism in Croatia, the pit was rediscovered. At a depth of around 40 metres (131 ft), the remains of more 800 skeletons were found. When the SO of HPD Željezničar explored the cave in 1990, they found garbage deposits alongside the human remains.

Since this period, the Catholic Church in Croatia has organised an annual pilgrimage to the site, held on June 22. The Church has lined the path to the pit from a nearby village with images of Stations of the Cross. The event was criticised by left-oriented journalists and media.

== Exhumations ==
=== 2020 exhumations ===
The Ministry of Croatian Veterans carried out the exhumation of the victims from the Jazovka pit in July 2020, and it was determined that there were at least 814 skeletons there. Further anthropological processing of the remains was carried out at the Institute of Forensic Medicine and Criminalistics in Zagreb.

From July 13 to July 17, 2020, the Ministry of Croatian Veterans conducted speleological research and exhumation of remains from the Jazovka pit, as well as test excavations with the aim of clarifying the second Jazovka pit.

The exhumation of the remains from Jazovka was carried out on the basis of the Law on research, arrangement and maintenance of military cemeteries, cemeteries of victims of the Second World War and the post-war period and a court order issued by the County Court in Zagreb. For the first time since the discovery of the existence of the Jazovka pit, the exhumation of the remains of the victims was systematically started.

The remains of at least 814 people were removed from the Jazovka pit, and immediately after the exhumation was completed, the determination of the minimum number of victims (MNI) was started based on the count of thigh bones. After the exhumation, the pit was thoroughly inspected once again to ensure that all remains had been removed. The bottom of the pit was documented by employees of the Ministry of Croatian Veterans and the Ministry of the Interior.

According to the information gathered by the interdepartmental services, these are victims of World War II and the post-war period. According to witness statements, the victims were thrown into the pit on several occasions, after the Battle of Krašić in 1943 and after the end of the war in 1945.

During the field research, the Ministry of Croatian Veterans' Affairs was provided with advisory support in the field by speleologist Mladen Kuka, who discovered the Jazovka cave in 1989 and has been collecting information about the cemetery over the years.

The remains were transported to the Institute of Forensic Medicine and Criminalistics in Zagreb, where their anthropological analysis was carried out.

=== Burial ===
On May 28, 2024, the construction site of the tomb for the burial of the remains of the victims thrown into Jazovka was blessed in the Parish of St. Mary Magdalene in Oštrac.

On European Day of Remembrance for Victims of Totalitarian and Authoritarian Regimes, August 23, 2025, the remains from Jazovka were buried in Sošice; The burial ceremony and the memorial mass were led by archbishop of Zagreb Dražen Kutleša, and the commemoration was also attended by the vice-president of the Government of the Republic of Croatia and the Minister of Croatian War Veterans, Tomo Medved, and the President of the Commission for Victims of World War II, Ivan Penava. Next to the grave, the Ministry erected a memorial, the work of sculptor Kuzma Kovačić, with the inscription "In memory of 814 victims killed by the Partisans, the Yugoslav Army and the communist regime during and after World War II".

== Notable executee ==
- Gaudencija Šplajt, Roman Catholic nun who was sentenced to execution by shooting by the Partisan military court in Zagreb on 29 June 1945. She was convicted of "aiding, harboring, and hiding Ustaša police director Ivan Tolj, and other Ustaše after the Soviet forces' and Partisans' liberation of Zagreb".

== See also ==
- List of caves on Žumberak
- List of deepest Dinaric caves

== Bibliography ==
- Balija, Petra (2021-04-16). "Kriju se čitavi labirinti: Špilje i jame – dom vila, ali i 'Židova'". Večernji list. eISSN 1333-9222.
- Novak, Ruđer (n.d.) [1990]. "Jazovka". Čisto podzemlje.
- Buzjak, Nenad (2006-06-17). "Speleološki katastar Parka prirode "Žumberak-Samoborsko gorje"". Subterranea Croatica. 4 (6): 47–52. ISSN 1334-5281.
- Buzjak, Nenad (2002-06-01). "Speleološke pojave u Parku prirode "Žumberak – Samoborsko gorje"" [Speleological Features of "Žumberak – Samoborsko gorje" Nature Park]. Geoadria. 7 (1): 31–49. doi:10.15291/geoadria.64. ISSN 1331-2294.
