= List of caves on Žumberak =

This is a list of caves on the Žumberak Mountains, including Radoha and Ljuben. Some of its caves are listed under Drvodevnik, usually considered part of the Žumberak Mountains, as well as under Krka and White Carniola. Part of the first version of the speleological cadastre of the Nature Park "Žumberak Mountains" was published in 2002, and instructions for the digital version were published in 2006. A continuously updated cadastre of the Slovene side is maintained by the Jamarski klub Novo mesto, with more information available in the national eKataster cave database.

Names	Depth	Length	State	Number	Elevation	Coordinates	Sources
Ajdovska jama na Radohi	15	48	No certification required.	SI06165	539	45.71223°N 15.17391°E	
Autobusna špilja	6	?	Caving certification required.	HR00184		45.81°N 15.67°E	
Avguštinec	20	26	No certification required.	SI10262	243	45.83742°N 15.43729°E	
Babina bombuša	7	9	Caving certification required. Danger! Explosive waste.	HR04001		45.69°N 15.42°E	
Badanj (Note: Špilja u Badnju)	0	10	Caving certification required.	HR01681		45.741710°N 15.410391°E	
Badovinčeva jama na Lavtrcah (Note: Lavtarška jama)	18	22	No certification required.	SI05568	409	45.7379°N 15.22639°E	
Banova jama	10	10	Caving certification required. Closed to the public.	SI07394	265	45.83539°N 15.43936°E	
Bedara	113	1593				Višoševići	
Bistrac	7					45.8228°N 15.6887°E	
Bizjakova jama	8	558	Caving certification required. Closed to the public.	SI07396	164	45.83902°N 15.43382°E	
Bolnica na Rasnu	7	12	No certification required.	SI07504	409	45.71433°N 15.15444°E	
Botričkovo brezno	20	29	No certification required.	SI14474	402	45.73997°N 15.2165°E	
Brezno 1 pod Gornjimi Lazi (Note: Radoha 6)	17	25	No certification required.	SI05672	413	45.69855°N 15.15004°E	
Brezno 1 pri Uršni jami	20	26	No certification required.	SI08751	384	45.6984°N 15.146°E	
Brezno 1 v Kančen dolu (Note: Zasuto brezno v Kančen dolu)	5	5	No certification required. Buried.	SI05569	369	45.76296°N 15.25142°E	
Brezno 2 na Tolanu (Note: Jama 2 na Tolanu)	8	37	No certification required.	SI04770	486	45.69424°N 15.15923°E	
Brezno 2 nad bolnico	10	15	No certification required.	SI08955	426	45.71376°N 15.15413°E	
Brezno 2 pod Gornjimi Lazi (Note: Radoha 5)	15	22	No certification required.	SI05673	389	45.69886°N 15.14889°E	
Brezno 2 pri Uršni jami	15	23	No certification required.	SI08752	391	45.69801°N 15.1464°E	
Brezno 2 v Kančen dolu	4	12	No certification required.	SI05570	361	45.76305°N 15.25206°E	
Brezno dveh zanimivih kapnikov	22	49	No certification required. Danger! Waste.	SI08560	414	45.70866°N 15.14097°E	
Brezno Husqvarna	12	14	No certification required.	SI09676	641	45.80869°N 15.45018°E	
Brezno izgubljenega svinčnika	16	25	No certification required.	SI08569	270	45.73518°N 15.14467°E	
Brezno jelenovega roga	8	15	No certification required.	SI08747	569	45.69218°N 15.16388°E	
Brezno Jurmani	26	52	No certification required.	SI08162	229	45.83784°N 15.39013°E	
Brezno Kladu padu	12	12	No certification required.	SI09675	253	45.83483°N 15.43685°E	
Brezno na Klemenčičevi njivi (Note: Udor na Klemenčičevi njivi, Brezno na njivi pri Pristavi)	11	20	No certification required. Danger! Waste.	SI05563	375	45.72988°N 15.18505°E	
Brezno na Oštariji	10	13	No certification required.	SI10972	469	45.71646°N 15.16215°E	
Brezno na Padežu	12	12	No certification required.	SI08754	275	45.74324°N 15.14393°E	
Brezno na Silovcu	31	31	No certification required. Danger! Waste.	SI03696	430	45.6992°N 15.28031°E	
Brezno na Škrilji	20	20	No certification required.	SI09896	467	45.65703°N 15.17449°E	
Brezno na Velikem placu	31	35	No certification required.	SI08668	440	45.7099°N 15.16161°E	
Brezno na Velikem placu 2	27	36	No certification required. Danger! Waste.	SI14479	438	45.71009°N 15.15367°E	
Brezno na Vrlem lazu	18	18	No certification required.	SI13742	812	45.71845°N 15.26096°E	
Brezno nad bolnico	8	12	No certification required.	SI08572	460	45.71592°N 15.15872°E	
Brezno nad Brusnikom	13	19	No certification required.	SI10263	247	45.84468°N 15.66057°E	
Brezno nad Izvirom	10	15	No certification required.	SI10438	373	45.85152°N 15.55263°E	
Brezno nad Jugorjem	19	35	No certification required. Danger! Waste.	SI09751	637	45.71367°N 15.24493°E	
Brezno nad krmiščem	13	20	No certification required.	SI11097	382	45.83511°N 15.63594°E	
Brezno nad obračališčem	10	10	No certification required.	SI08763	588	45.70526°N 15.17112°E	
Brezno nad ovinkom 2	13	13	No certification required.	SI08652	359	45.82711°N 15.44038°E	
Brezno nad Predalnico	25	43	No certification required.	SI07887	541	45.7155°N 15.18951°E	
Brezno nad prežo	13	27	No certification required.	SI08753	634	45.70456°N 15.17739°E	
Brezno nad Vranjo pečjo	35	40	No certification required.	SI09296	648	45.75931°N 15.27445°E	
Brezno ostrega kamina	22	42	No certification required. Danger! Waste.	SI08561	410	45.70931°N 15.14322°E	
Brezno pod Brezjem	12	23	No certification required.	SI13131	501	45.83685°N 15.488°E	
Brezno pod bukvijo	13	16	No certification required.	SI08664	673	45.70386°N 15.20608°E	
Brezno pod Kamnim vrhom	23	33	No certification required. Danger! Waste.	SI09897	640	45.68516°N 15.18774°E	
Brezno pod Mehovskim hribom (Note: Prepadna v Mehovem)	30	44	No certification required.	SI05565	432	45.74407°N 15.20366°E	
Brezno pod Peščenikom	39	80	No certification required.	SI08046	610	45.68751°N 15.18845°E	
Brezno pod Semeničem (Note: Aupičeva jama)	16	38	No certification required.	SI11966	558	45.65119°N 15.15967°E	
Brezno pod skalo v Blatni dolini	16	21	No certification required.	SI06164	454	45.70372°N 15.16122°E	
Brezno pod štreko	12	24	No certification required.	SI04876	254	45.71052°N 15.12475°E	
Brezno povabljencev	15	28	No certification required.	SI09960	408	45.82961°N 15.147217°E	
Brezno pozabljenega karabina	16	16	No certification required.	SI08665	581	45.70829°N 15.17409°E	
Brezno pri bivaku	30	30	No certification required.	SI09265	696	45.80111°N 15.45827°E	
Brezno pri Ciganskem placu	22	23	No certification required.	SI08194	445	45.65468°N 15.1537°E	
Brezno pri Dobenem 1	14	19	No certification required.	SI11383	231	45.87623°N 15.60157°E	
Brezno pri Dobenem 2	8	10	No certification required.	SI08978	273	45.87337°N 15.61479°E	
Brezno pri Dobenem 3	12	12	No certification required.	SI08979	262	45.87298°N 15.6026°E	
Brezno pri gmajnah	22	32	No certification required.	SI11109	394	45.67503°N 15.15856°E	
Brezno pri Hudičevi jami	8	10	No certification required.	SI10774	370	45.75007°N 15.11051°E	
Brezno pri Jelenci	23	27	No certification required.	SI14230	232	45.76357°N 15.0853°E	
Brezno pri križišču	12	12	No certification required.	SI08746	588	45.70257°N 15.18356°E	
Brezno pri lovski koči	16	17	No certification required.	SI07795	539	45.81916°N 15.42958°E	
Brezno pri Mihovcu	31	36	No certification required.	SI07895	385	45.72821°N 15.17073°E	
Brezno pri obračališču 2	14	25	No certification required.	SI09029	462	45.67365°N 15.16864°E	
Brezno pri Pribišju (Note: Brezno pri obračališču 1)	19	19	No certification required.	SI07715	462	45.67373°N 15.16977°E	
Brezno pri Pristavi	7	11	No certification required.	SI13754	464	45.72216°N 15.18072°E	
Brezno pri Pucarjevem globočaku	20	20	No certification required.	SI11469	479	45.65791°N 15.16999°E	
Brezno pri Sobenji vasi	20	27	No certification required.	SI08981	361	45.86165°N 15.58646°E	
Brezno pri Švalovi koči	13	22	No certification required.	SI13942	770	45.80292°N 15.39973°E	
Brezno pri tabli	9	12	No certification required.	SI11470	536	45.66912°N 15.17526°E	
Brezno pri Vodenicah (Note: Straguljčeva jama, Gorenčeva jama)	13	66	No certification required.	SI03265	295	45.8311°N 15.38149°E	
Brezno sladke zmage	22	52	No certification required.	SI13527	507	45.8234°N 15.43734°E	
Brezno spečega zmaja	13	18	No certification required.	SI08554	285	45.7296°N 15.1416°E	
Brezno Štanga	14	27	No certification required.	SI08676	472	45.6762°N 15.16975°E	
Brezno Sv. Lovrenca	25	28	No certification required.	SI09893	540	45.66207°N 15.17982°E	
Brezno v Cerovcu	22	23	No certification required.	SI12611	457	45.74303°N 15.23184°E	
Brezno v dobenskih Lazah	16	66	No certification required.	SI11096	355	45.86573°N 15.60483°E	
Brezno v gaju	10	10	No certification required.	SI10452	248	45.83431°N 15.43159°E	
Brezno v Jurnski hosti	13	21	No certification required.	SI07894	295	45.7317°N 15.16601°E	
Brezno v klopovi gošči	22	32	No certification required.	SI08667	458	45.70662°N 15.15956°E	
Brezno v kotu	15	23	No certification required.	SI08980	680	45.79624°N 15.47063°E	
Brezno v Ravnem bukovju 1	35	44	No certification required. Danger! Waste.	SI09894	529	45.6635°N 15.17061°E	
Brezno v Ravnem bukovju 2	16	19	No certification required.	SI09895	529	45.66365°N 15.17088°E	
Brezno žabje družine	12	17	No certification required.	SI08666	455	45.70523°N 15.16244°E	
Brijačica	30	35.4	Caving certification required.	HR03725		45.74°N 15.30°E	
Brusnik	7	34	No certification required.	SI11681	191	45.84445°N 15.66301°E	
Bunovka 1							
Bunovka 2							
Bužasta škulja	2	9	Caving certification required.	HR02800		45.83°N 15.55°E	(Note: ˙)
Cepinka	17	22	Caving certification required. Danger! Waste.	HR04025		45.755059°N 15.367826°E	(Note: ˙˙)
Cestnica	28	33	No certification required.	SI09455	635	45.68486°N 15.17005°E	
Contova jama	16	23	No certification required.	SI07888	262	45.80826°N 15.29701°E	
Cvičkovo brezno	20	20	Caving certification required. Closed to the public.	SI08582	340	45.83419°N 15.44702°E	
Čebularica	34	84	No certification required.	SI05145	340	45.76447°N 15.23627°E	
Čerenkova prepadna (Note: Črenkov kot)	29	58	No certification required. Danger! Waste.	SI07886	517	45.68825°N 15.15663°E	
Čestitke	18	22	No certification required.	SI07797	571	45.81371°N 15.42042°E	
Čivka	16	40	No certification required.	SI09707	512	45.80457°N 15.35253°E	
Dakina jama	36	?	Caving certification required.	HR00711		45.75°N 15.31°E	(Note: ˙˙˙)
Dihalnik nad Bizjakovo jamo	13	50	No certification required.	SI11680	199	45.84018°N 15.43589°E	
Dihalnik pri Jelenci	8	11	No certification required.	SI14236	235	45.76386°N 15.08507°E	
Divja mačka 1	9	18	No certification required.	SI14492	754	45.71244°N 15.26712°E	
Divja mačka 2	10	13	No certification required.	SI14493	697	45.71088°N 15.26705°E	
Dobenski rupači	15	20	No certification required.	SI08982	269	45.87337°N 15.61517°E	
Dolača	155	1262 (Note: 1171)	Caving certification required. Danger! Waste.	HR00591		45.74887441°N 15.48774879°E	(Note: ˙˙˙˙˙˙˙)
Dolačina mama	12	15	Caving certification required.	HR02454		45.67°N 15.44°E	(Note: ˙˙˙)
Dolnja jama (Note: Jama 2 v Trlicah, Trlice)	63	61	No certification required. Danger! Waste.	SI03269	693	45.80658°N 15.44894°E	
Dorina	11	11	No certification required.	SI08958	440	45.70978°N 15.14959°E	
Draškovec 1	10	12	No certification required. Danger! Waste.	SI14494	554	45.67615°N 15.18205°E	
Draškovec 2	8	11	No certification required.	SI14495	596	45.67799°N 15.18191°E	
Draškovec 3	16	28	No certification required.	SI14496	631	45.68008°N 15.18842°E	
Drobovnik	2	673	Caving certification required.	HR04037		45.72966173°N 15.33087629°E	(Note: ˙˙˙˙)
Dubićeva znetva	1.5	6	Caving certification required. Danger! Waste.	HR00155		45.771013°N 15.7009975°E	(Note: ˙˙)
Dubrava 2			Danger! Waste.			45.808723°N 15.673075°E	(Note: ˙˙˙˙)
Dubrava 3						45.8090212°N 15.672891°E	(Note: ˙˙˙˙)
Duga špilja	0	?	Caving certification required.	HR03371		45.74°N 15.32°E	
Duga jama (Note: Dubrava X)						45.808900°N 15.673180°E	(Note: ˙˙˙)
Duškova jama	9	16	Caving certification required.	HR04040		45.82°N 15.56°E	
Dvojno brezno pri Jugorju	15	25	No certification required. Danger! Waste.	SI09609	622	45.71544°N 15.22739°E	
Frlinka na Novem Ljubnu (Note: Brezno pod hrastom, Naljubenska Frlinka, Sromahovo brezno)	27	31	No certification required.	SI04398	410	45.73616°N 15.11559°E	
Frlinka pod Uršnimi seli (Note: Brezno v Košenicah)	17	21	No certification required.	SI01409	288	45.72528°N 15.12449°E	
Frlinka v Vrtih na Ljubnu	4	7	No certification required.	SI04398	240	45.73361°N 15.0952°E	
Fučno	8	10	No certification required.	SI09122	330	45.8428°N 15.60311°E	
Gobanovo brezno	15	15	No certification required.	SI08677	473	45.67564°N 15.17229°E	
Gorenčeva rupa	25	37	No certification required. Danger! Waste.	SI03266	377	45.82816°N 15.38413°E	
Gorica	0	11	Caving certification required.	HR00896		45.80°N 15.69°E	
Gorjanc	226	262	No certification required.	SI14957	754	45.80059°N 15.45035°E	
Gornja jama (Note: Jama 1 v Trlicah, Trlice)	22	22	No certification required.	SI03268	738	45.80483°N 15.44611°E	
Grabovnik	12	20	Caving certification required.	HR03561		45.79°N 15.62°E	(Note: ˙)
Grabrska jama (Note: Jama v Grabrju, Jama Grabrje)	55	307	No certification required.	SI04835	373	45.77844°N 15.27256°E	
Grgosova špilja stara (Note: Grgosova špilja donja)	19	52	Guided tour cave.			45.819055°N 15.678476°E	(Note: ˙˙˙˙˙˙˙˙˙˙)
Grgosova špilja nova (Note: Grgosova špilja donja)	14	97	Guided tour cave.			45.818796°N 15.678390°E	
Grota (Note: Na Kremenu)	6	6	No certification required.	SI05567	526	45.72331°N 15.21546°E	
Grubarjevo brezno	23	32	No certification required. Danger! Waste.	SI14958	553	45.81185°N 15.3832°E	
Hladilnik	18	21	No certification required.	SI08653	495	45.81909°N 15.44224°E	
Hrastovka	72	125	No certification required.	SI09140	304	45.72783°N 15.13115°E	
Hrenov grič (Note: Drenov grič)	0	34	Caving certification required. Danger! Waste.	HR00684		45.6485°N 15.4175°E	(Note: ˙˙˙˙˙˙)
Hrušica 1	5	61	No certification required.	SI05023	271	45.78637°N 15.24566°E	
Hrušica 2	0	9	No certification required.	SI06036	250	45.78766°N 15.24528°E	
Hudičeva jama	11	11	No certification required. Danger! Waste.	SI02345	384	45.74874°N 15.11207°E	
Ivanovka 1	17	21	No certification required.	SI08956	436	45.71112°N 15.15324°E	
Ivanovka 2	12	12	No certification required.	SI08957	434	45.71099°N 15.15342°E	
Izgubljeno brezno	16	16	No certification required.	SI08749	590	45.70844°N 15.17563°E	
Izvir pod Vuzelnico	0	10	No certification required.	SI10171	345	45.6952°N 15.36416°E	
Izvor špilja ispod Jevtićeva	0	6.5		HR03942		45.65°N 15.44°E	
Izvor špilja Siga	0	?		HR03358		45.72°N 15.31°E	
Jankova špilja	2	10.4	Caving certification required.	HR03825		45.82°N 15.55°E	
Jama 1 na Tolanu	25	43	No certification required.	SI04769	482	45.69464°N 15.15584°E	
Jama 1 nad Gospodično	2	12	No certification required.	SI05827	875	45.7658°N 15.2979°E	
Jama 1 pri Tabli	12	12	No certification required.	SI09030	515	45.66793°N 15.17042°E	
Jama 1 v Grajski hosti	11	14	No certification required. Danger! Waste.	SI08557	298	45.72961°N 15.13236°E	
Jama 2 na Padežu	12	23	No certification required.	SI14292	268	45.73127°N 15.14291°E	
Jama 2 nad Gospodično	4	17	No certification required.	SI05828	910	45.76611°N 15.30158°E	
Jama 2 pri Radohi	12	20	No certification required.	SI04880	501	45.71286°N 15.16841°E	
Jama 2 pri Tabli	11	11	No certification required.	SI09031	533	45.66738°N 15.17088°E	
Jama 2 v Grajski hosti	8	18	No certification required. Danger! Waste.	SI08558	299	45.72948°N 15.13241°E	
Jama 2K	31	97	No certification required.	SI14959	359	45.85091°N 15.55504°E	
Jama 3 nad Gospodično	0	8	No certification required.	SI05829	908	45.76616°N 15.30165°E	
Jama 3 v Grajski hosti	7	15	No certification required.	SI08559	298	45.72923°N 15.13349°E	
Jama Cesar	5	15	No certification required.	SI08669	580	45.71076°N 15.18593°E	
Jama divjega moža (Note: Moževa hiša)	2	71	No certification required.	SI01225	506	45.71417°N 15.35404°E	
Jama Himalaja	52	97	Caving certification required. Closed to the public.	SI13529	226	45.8345°N 15.3982°E	
Jama ispod ceste	24	?	Caving certification required. Danger! Waste.	HR00776		45.75°N 15.38°E	˙
Jama iznad ceste	12	?	Caving certification required.	HR00831		45.75572°N 15.38782°E	(Note: ˙˙)
Jama kod Golog vrha	5	8	Caving certification required.	HR0910		45.81°N 15.67°E	(Note: ˙)
Jama kod Katuna	9	11		HR02870		45.81°N 15.49°E	(Note: ˙)
Jama kod Latkovića							
Jama kod Malinaca							
Jama kod starog mlina	19	?	Danger! Waste.	HR02008	Caving certification required.	45.756316°N 15.373874°E	(Note: ˙˙˙˙˙)
Jama kod Strahinića	29	?	Caving certification required.	HR01688		45.69801°N 15.39619°E	(Note: ˙˙)
Jama Kotari	20	?	Caving certification required. Danger! Waste.	HR02793		45.716860°N 15.313065°E	(Note: ˙˙˙˙˙)
Jama kraj puta Rajići-Herakovići	5	?	Caving certification required.	HR01678		45.7613°N 15.5148°E	(Note: ˙˙)
Jama Krči	9						
Jama Krči	25	27	Caving certification required. Danger! Waste.	HR00168		45.8144264°N 15.6870573°E	(Note: ˙)
Jama na Brdu	6	7	Caving certification required. Danger! Waste.	HR03365		45.752964°N 15.519168°E	(Note: ˙)
Jama na cesti	20	?	Caving certification required.	HR02342		45.7114°N 15.3206°E	(Note: ˙˙)
Jama na Dugom bregu obr Gabrovice	8	10	Caving certification required.	HR00905		45.83°N 15.61°E	(Note: ˙)
Jama na Grohotih (Note: Čudna jama, Jama na Žejnem, Jama pri Tungučevem kozolcu)	8	42	Gated.	SI03064	266	45.87527°N 15.59326°E	
Jama na Javorniku	14	27	Caving certification required.	HR04006		45.73290°N 15.28239°E	(Note: ˙)
Jama na Leščini (Note: Jama v Hrvaškem gaju)	15	78	No certification required.	SI00679	355	45.84509°N 15.50197°E	
Jama na Oklinku	10	?	Caving certification required. Danger! Waste.	HR03359		45.727045°N 15.276153°E	(Note: ˙˙)
Jama na Padežu	10	64	No certification required.	SI07880	289	45.73621°N 15.16032°E	
Jama na Paljetini	22	?				45.675479°N 15.439802°E	
Jama na Rtiću iznad strane	12.6	8	Caving certification required.	HR03521		45.77°N 15.42°E	
Jama na Taljanovi kopi	15	23	No certification required.	SI14293	638	45.68521°N 15.18165°E	
Jama nad izvirom Težke vode (Note: Jama Strmoče)	5	5	No certification required.	SI05146	240	45.76693°N 15.20981°E	
Jama nad potokom Klamfer	11	20	No certification required.	SI05834	245	45.78026°N 15.22825°E	
Jama nad Subanovim mlinom	12	56	No certification required.	SI07794	272	45.85416°N 15.57294°E	
Jama ob Bregani	1	20	No certification required.	SI01377	230	45.83899°N 15.61109°E	
Jama Ostrišnjak (Note: Jama na Ostrišnjaku)	29	?	Caving certification required. Danger! Waste.	HR04075		45.775757°N 15.451366°E	(Note: ˙)
Jama pod grabom u Barama	3	10	Caving certification required.	HR04096		45.78°N 15.42°E	
Jama pod Gradom	22	?	Caving certification required.	HR01699		45.68°N 15.44°E	(Note: ˙˙)
Jama pod gradom Mokrice	4	17	No certification required.	SI06226	157	45.85906°N 15.67495°E	
Jama pod gradom Smuk	11	13	No certification required.	SI09032	530	45.66211°N 15.17614°E	
Jama pod Škuljevim mlinom 1	25	203	No certification required.	SI13132	340	45.82705°N 15.46811°E	
Jama pod Peščenikom	1	12	No certification required.	SI09750	620	45.69567°N 15.17086°E	
Jama pod Škuljevim mlinom 2	5	37	No certification required.	SI11210	332	45.82744°N 15.46808°E	
Jama pod Vranjo pečjo	11	24	No certification required.	SI09297	478	45.76466°N 15.27214°E	
Jama polžjih hišic	10	33	No certification required.	SI08568	376	45.71865°N 15.14934°E	
Jama pri Bosanski bajti	68	123	No certification required.	SI02802	801	45.8022°N 15.43797°E	
Jama pri Franji u kleti	9	11	Caving certification required.	HR00904		45.82°N 15.67°E	
Jama pri gozdarski koči na Opatovi gori (Note: Jama nad Cankarjevo kočo, Jama pri Aleksandrovi koči)	5	27	No certification required.	SI00383	616	45.81328°N 15.42508°E	
Jama pri Pristavi	12	24	No certification required.	SI13793	474	45.71875°N 15.17548°E	
Jama pri Radohi	41	80	No certification required.	SI00832	476	45.70357°N 15.16547°E	
Jama pri Radoški udornici 1	6	10	No certification required.	SI14246	441	45.69936°N 15.15426°E	
Jama pri Radoški udornici 2	7	10	No certification required.	SI14247	420	45.70041°N 15.15228°E	
Jama pri Rumanji vasi	11	35	No certification required.	SI09295	228	45.76925°N 15.06756°E	
Jama pri Semeniču	8	26	No certification required.	SI13654	513	45.65586°N 15.16069°E	
Jama pri tunelu	6	12	No certification required.	SI14248	404	45.69516°N 15.1373°E	
Jama pri Uršni jami	6	11	No certification required.	SI14851	403	45.69699°N 15.14583°E	
Jama Trzno	21	?	Caving certification required.	HR01676		45.7638°N 15.5168°E	(Note: ˙)
Jama u Bubnju	5	7	Caving certification required.	HR00180		45.81°N 15.69°E	
Jama u dijaklazi I	10	28	Danger! Waste.			45.809371°N 15.673858°E	(Note: ˙˙)
Jama u Grabiku	24	44.5	Caving certification required.	HR02872		45.69°N 15.30°E	
Jama u jamama (Note: Rupa u jamama)	7	16	Caving certification required. Danger! Biowaste.	HR00915		45.809061°N 15.493362°E	(Note: ˙˙)
Jama u Japagama 2	9	15	Caving certification required.	HR03356		45.73°N 15.40°E	
Jama u Japagama 3	6	12	Caving certification required.	HR03617		45.73°N 15.40°E	
Jama u Koletićevoj šumi	4	6.5	Caving certification required. Danger! Waste.	HR04091		45.772782°N 15.714433°E	(Note: ˙)
Jama u Lukama (Note: Jama kod Luka)	15	?	Caving certification required.	HR00717		45.74°N 15.30°E	(Note: ˙)
Jama u Maloj gori	11	19.2	Caving certification required. Danger! Waste.	HR03990		45.78051°N 15.46771°E	(Note: ˙˙)
Jama u Mikama	10	12	Caving certification required.	HR0901		45.81°N 15.67°E	
Jama u Miljevoj dragi	7	9	Caving certification required. Danger! Explosive waste.	HR03984		45.69°N 15.42°E	
Jama u Mrzlim dragama							
Jama u Regovićevoj njivi u Žingorima	8	11	Caving certification required.	HR00903		45.82°N 15.67°E	
Jama u Vrloj strani	35	?	Caving certification required.	HR03360		45.72605°N 15.27506°E	(Note: ˙˙)
Jama u Zapolju	6	?	Caving certification required. Danger! Biowaste.	HR03362		45.755860°N 15.546900°E	(Note: ˙)
Jama u 6. odjelu	7	?	Caving certification required.	HR03367	866	45.75444748°N 15.30249138°E	
Jama v Beležih	18	20	No certification required.	SI11472	573	45.68533°N 15.1951°E	
Jama v Boršteku	9	17	No certification required.	SI09139	266	45.74165°N 15.18914°E	
Jama v Dnu	6	10	No certification required.	SI14506	531	45.71361°N 15.17992°E	
Jama v Dovčku	54	316	Caving certification required. Closed to the public.	SI11474	458	45.82434°N 15.43022°E	
Jama v koričanskem kamnolomu	1	14	No certification required.	SI11682	242	45.85304°N 15.65624°E	
Jama v Pohlicah	6	7	No certification required. Damaged or destroyed.	SI02346	284	45.74607°N 15.12798°E	
Jama v Robidnici	11	20	No certification required.	SI10969	325	45.75971°N 15.23063°E	
Jama v travi	12	17	No certification required.	SI14294	550	45.68676°N 15.15992°E	
Jama Vendeta (Note: Jama Vendetta)	5	?	Caving certification required. Danger! Waste.	HR03361		45.71°N 15.27°E	
Jama za šaku kuna	21	25	Caving certification required.	HR0902		45.81°N 15.67°E	
Jama zavitih stalaktitov	7	20	No certification required.	SI08555	290	45.73213°N 15.13992°E	
Jamina žumberačka	30	143	Caving certification required.	HR01338		45.69915°N 15.42468°E	(Note: ˙˙˙)
Jamina pod Piskom	10	17	Caving certification required. Human remains. Danger! Waste.	HR03978	370	45.71825°N 15.41753°E	(Note: ˙˙˙)
Jamura	8	?	Caving certification required.	HR02792		45.76336459°N 15.49426637°E	(Note: ˙˙˙)
Jarkovičeva klet	11	11	No certification required.	SI11493	248	45.83683°N 15.43747°E	
Jazavčarka	0	6	Caving certification required.	HR00160		45.79°N 15.67°E	
Jazbečeva jama na Ljubnu	7	10	No certification required.	SI13983	506	45.74472°N 15.10906°E	
Jazovka	56	?	Human remains. Danger! Waste.			45.756455°N 15.389330°E	(Note: ˙˙˙)
Jelenca	10	73	No certification required.	SI14236	220	45.7642°N 15.08435°E	
Jelenskok	2	10	No certification required.	SI05826	760	45.76°N 15.29206°E	
Jelušca (Note: Brezno pri treh lužah)	36	42	No certification required. Danger! Waste.	SI04991	628	45.71525°N 15.21204°E	
Jernejeva polšna	20	24	No certification required.	SI08825	250	45.76273°N 15.08843°E	
Jezna sova	16	31	No certification required.	SI14295	570	45.69018°N 15.16353°E	
Juraševa pećina	1	36	Caving certification required.	HR03829		45.75°N 15.32°E	(Note: ˙)
Kadiševa jama (Note: Brezno v Bojanji vasi nad Metliko)	50	50	No certification required. Danger! Waste.	SI00854	390	45.69417°N 15.32856°E	
Kamenolomska jama (Note: Puhaljka, Otruševac II, Otruševac 2, Otruševec 2, Spilja u kamenolomu)	12	161	Caving certification required.	HR00185		45.819341°N 15.678829°E	(Note: ˙˙)
Keltska jama	12	32	No certification required.	SI09298	410	45.74448°N 15.22659°E	
Kengurujeva jazbina	19	43	No certification required.	SI08583	368	45.82739°N 15.63809°E	
Kevderc pri Pristavi	6	10	No certification required.	SI13800	408	45.72566°N 15.18174°E	
Kičer (Note: Kečer)	64	130	No certification required.	SI05062	546	45.8205°N 15.43095°E	
Kipina jama (Note: Kipova jama)	35	95	No certification required. Danger! Waste.	SI00853	399	45.69341°N 15.32541°E	
Klemenca	16	29	No certification required. Danger! Waste.	SI03874	486	45.69789°N 15.2826°E	
Koprivnica	39	50	Caving certification required.	HR03471		45.77°N 15.45°E	
Kostanjeviška jama (Note: Jama nad izvirom Studene)	47	1871	Guided tour cave.	SI00518	170	45.83798°N 15.43423°E	(Note: ˙)
Kotarjeva prepadna (Note: Brezno pri vasi Jama)	54	126	No certification required.	SI00187	229	45.7546°N 15.17029°E	
Kraljeva prepadna	15	19	No certification required.	SI05825	405	45.76869°N 15.27402°E	
Kremenjek	11	17	No certification required.	SI15164	270	45.85517°N 15.56864°E	
Kreščak	38	1279	No certification required.	SI05849	293	45.85334°N 15.64415°E	
Krojačevka	70	103	No certification required.	SI05597	520	45.71632°N 15.18846°E	
Kukarca	21	32	No certification required.	SI08678	625	45.68137°N 15.17604°E	
Kune špilja	10	?	Caving certification required.	HR03363		45.75°N 15.54°E	
Lalovićeva jama	20	?	Caving certification required.	HR01684		45.68°N 15.44°E	(Note: ˙˙)
Lanska jama	17	22	No certification required.	SI09706	421	45.80949°N 15.35684°E	
Levakova jama (Note: Jama v Šutni)	20	350	No certification required.	SI00517	208	45.84954°N 15.48822°E	
Lijeskova jama (Note: Protutenkovska jama u Lijeskovim dragama)	19	28	Caving certification required.	HR03877		45.72°N 15.29°E	
Liparjeva polšna	11	11	No certification required.	SI09266	667	45.80061°N 15.46572°E	
Lisičarka	0	?	Caving certification required.	HR03355		45.72°N 15.31°E	
Lisičina pod Ponikvo (Note: Bašičev zdenc, Jama pod Dolinskim jarkom)	46	1858	No certification required.	SI01376	292	45.85069°N 15.64513°E	
Lisičina pod Ravnim vrhom	3	13	No certification required.	SI09056	375	45.74681°N 15.20092°E	
Lisičje rupe	0	?	Caving certification required.	HR01680	638	45.75192°N 15.53669°E	(Note: ˙)
Lisina špilja	6	22.7	Caving certification required.	HR04063		45.69351°N 15.44166°E	
Mačkovac	16	?	Caving certification required.	HR03373		45.67°N 15.42°E	
Majeva jama	8	22	No certification required.	SI09619	383	45.76878°N 15.23612°E	
Mala jama	20	25	No certification required. Danger! Waste.	SI02014	322	45.74974°N 15.11452°E	
Mala propast	15	?	Caving certification required.	HR03376		45.76°N 15.54°E	
Mala Talarnica	16	22	No certification required.	SI11427	455	45.70596°N 15.33796°E	
Mali pekel	5	27	No certification required.	SI05061	700	45.81138°N 15.43296°E	
Međeđa jama	36	45.7	Caving certification required.	HR02805		45.72°N 15.28°E	
Mesaruša kod Dugog Vrha			Danger! Biowaste.			45.679366°N 15.449582°E	
Mihovska jama	54	190	No certification required.	SI06484	426	45.72224°N 15.16388°E	
Mikulićka (Note: Spilja u Mikulićki)	25	112	Caving certification required.	HR01385		45.76899664°N 15.53284798°E	(Note: ˙˙)
Milićka jama (Note: Milića jama, Milićina jama)	24	54	Caving certification required.	HR02794		45.72604124°N 15.31574186°E	(Note: ˙˙˙)
Mišja jama pri Ceru	13	24	No certification required.	SI12180	767	45.71214°N 15.26598°E	
Mlake	13	14	No certification required.	SI07876	656	45.70263°N 15.19826°E	
Mlake 2	15	22	No certification required.	SI14265	670	45.7014°N 15.19999°E	
Mlinška jama (Note: Jama pri mlinu)	10	10	No certification required. Danger! Waste.	SI00850	461	45.70841°N 15.34286°E	
Mrgudova špilja	32	50	Caving certification required.	HR03370		45.74°N 15.31°E	
Mrka špilja	0	36	Caving certification required.	HR02784		45.72°N 15.33°E	
Mrkobradog špilja	5	?	Caving certification required.	HR03354		45.73°N 15.37°E	(Note: ˙)
Nad petim kamnom	20	26	No certification required.	SI07500	484	45.70028°N 15.16199°E	
Nad progo 2	10	19	No certification required.	SI07503	353	45.70009°N 15.14353°E	
Nad zadnjim ovinkom 1	5	31	No certification required.	SI007507	570	45.71083°N 15.17954°E	
Nad zadnjim ovinkom 2	10	10	No certification required.	SI007507	575	45.71092°N 15.17993°E	
Nojevo brezno	18	23	No certification required.	SI13133	400	45.82445°N 15.44787°E	
Nova jama kraj puta	7	16	Caving certification required.	HR00912		45.78°N 15.71°E	
Novi Ljuben 1	6	11	No certification required.	SI13992	524	45.74252°N 15.11111°E	
Nekrštena špilja	4	7	Caving certification required.	HR03465		45.75°N 15.38°E	
Nerize	6	20	No certification required.	SI11393	337	45.68424°N 15.35163°E	
Palovica (Note: Jama kod Liješća, Otkopana jama)	52	?	Caving certification required. Danger! Waste. Danger! Biowaste.	HR00719		45.695233°N 15.313023°E	(Note: ˙)
Pajina jazavčarka 2	1	27	Caving certification required.	HR03558		45.7616°N 15.4136°E	(Note: ˙)
Palatina	23	30	No certification required.	SI07873	685	45.69366°N 15.17127°E	
Paracepinka	2	6.6	Caving certification required.	HR03837		45.75°N 15.36°E	
Pasja jama na Drganjih selih	2	7	No certification required.	SI04573	289	45.75367°N 15.10288°E	
Pasja jama na Humu	7	9	Caving certification required.	HR00906		45.81°N 15.60°E	
Pasje brezno	8	17	No certification required.	SI07796	278	45.83656°N 15.43966°E	
Pavlovica	38	?	Caving certification required.	HR00687	272	45.706705°N 15.331758°E	(Note: ˙˙˙˙˙˙)
Pečenevka (Note: Pečenjevka)	98	230	No certification required.	SI00851	453	45.70736°N 15.34014°E	(Note: ˙˙˙)
Pećina Draga							(Note: ˙˙)
Pećina ispod Griča u Badnju I	0	7	Caving certification required.	HR01674		45.7666°N 15.4430°E	(Note: ˙)
Pećina ispod Griča u Badnju II	0	11	Caving certification required.	HR01675		45.7666°N 15.4453°E	(Note: ˙)
Pećina ispod livade						map in Božić 1971	
Pećina ispod Vranjaka						map in Božić 1971	
Pekel	137	529	No certification required.	SI05059	665	45.81061°N 15.4314°E	
Perlec	20	20	No certification required.	SI10501	290	45.74519°N 15.13199°E	
Peski	10	12	No certification required.	SI07875	672	45.6983°N 15.20281°E	
Petričev rov (Note: Brezno Belevina)	40	42	No certification required.	SI00856	350	45.69454°N 15.33908°E	
Pihalnik	22	8	No certification required. Danger! Waste.	SI08983	209	45.83847°N 15.43531°E	
Piščale	10	29	No certification required.	SI07874	635	45.70408°N 15.18055°E	
Pirišće 1	6	7	Caving certification required. Danger! Waste.	HR00183		45.810676°N 15.685356°E	˙
Pirišće 2 (Note: Pirišće)	19	20	Caving certification required. Danger! Waste.	HR00182		45.811858°N 15.6865624°E	(Note: ˙)
Plavinka	32	50	Caving certification required.	HR03681		45.74°N 15.30°E	(Note: ˙)
Pod Cesarjem	4	10	No certification required.	SI07505	585	45.70853°N 15.18236°E	
Pod Kilovcem	35	44	No certification required.	SI07506	578	45.70958°N 15.17491°E	
Pod Lipnim vrhom 1	23	42	No certification required.	SI07889	505	45.71832°N 15.1673°E	
Pod Lipnim vrhom 2	8	12	No certification required.	SI07890	510	45.71832°N 15.16781°E	
Pod Lipnim vrhom 3	10	10	No certification required.	SI07891	525	45.71616°N 15.16838°E	
Pod petim kamnom	11	22	No certification required.	SI07501	465	45.70132°N 15.16031°E	
Podgrobljuša	0	11		HR03655		45.72°N 15.31°E	
Podzvir (Note: Podizvir)	0	57	Caving certification required.	HR00907		45.80°N 15.67°E	(Note: ˙˙˙)
Pogana jama	32	62	Caving certification required.	HR01379		45.7934°N 15.4306°E	(Note: ˙˙˙˙˙˙˙˙˙˙)
Poganščica	18	40	No certification required. Danger! Waste.	SI06341	548	45.80526°N 15.35449°E	
Polharsko brezno	11	15	No certification required.	SI10451	704	45.80613°N 15.45294°E	
Polšna na Nadbučarju	12	12	No certification required.	SI08563	408	45.70873°N 15.1361°E	
Polšnica v Ravnem bukovju	11	12	No certification required.	SI09344	538	45.66585°N 15.17895°E	
Polušpilja na Gradni	0	6	Caving certification required.	HR03597		45.77°N 15.66°E	
Polušpilja u Rudarskoj Dragi							
Ponor na Budinjačkom polju (Note: Ponor na Budinjaku)	6	13		H03824		45.79°N 15.50°E	(Note: ˙)
Ponor u Anin-dolu							
Ponor u Keserskim blatima	4	?	Caving certification required.	HR03366		45.75°N 15.33°E	
Poševna jama na Oštariji	10	17	No certification required.	SI10973	471	45.71657°N 15.16194°E	
Pseudocepinka	2	8.6	Caving certification required.	HR03949		45.75°N 15.36°E	
Ponor u Stićima	4	30	Caving certification required. Danger! Waste.	HR03884		45.743111°N 15.530153°E	(Note: ˙)
Požiralnik pod Peščenikom	14	25	No certification required.	SI08748	588	45.6962°N 15.1702°E	
Predalnica	12	30	No certification required.	SI05598	519	45.71597°N 15.18816°E	
Preloge 1	10	19	No certification required.	SI07902	440	45.66429°N 15.16271°E	
Preloge 2 (Note: Polžkova jama)	18	18	No certification required.	SI08174	397	45.66881°N 15.1603°E	
Preloge 3 (Note: Konjska kostnica)	22	55	No certification required.	SI08175	397	45.6679°N 15.16217°E	
Preloge 4	14	27	No certification required.	SI09299	365	45.66437°N 15.15593°E	
Preloge 5	8	10	No certification required. Danger! Waste.	SI10955	440	45.66305°N 15.16209°E	
Prepadna jama na Drganjih selih	8	12	No certification required. Danger! Waste.	SI04570	258	45.75299°N 15.09356°E	
Propuh	0	?	Caving certification required.	HR03378		45.67°N 15.47°E	(Note: ˙)
Radoška jama (Note: Librenica)	54		No certification required.	SI01357	503	45.71089°N 15.16874°E	
Rasnovka	15	22	No certification required.	SI14303	353	45.72276°N 15.15414°E	
Rasnovka 2	15	21	No certification required.	SI14304	330	45.72243°N 15.13769°E	
Rasnovka 3	8	14	No certification required.	SI14519	377	45.72107°N 15.14757°E	
Rasnovka 4	6	10	No certification required.	SI14520	375	45.71536°N 15.15075°E	
Ratnovec	1	5	No certification required.	SI05679	354	45.7661°N 15.24129°E	
Rihtarica (Note: Rihtarca)	13	16	No certification required.	SI04994	515	45.69531°N 15.20646°E	
Robidovka	9	19	No certification required.	SI08675	430	45.67528°N 15.166°E	
Rov pri Kostanjeviški jami (Note: Tektonsko zrcalo)	22	8	No certification required.	SI07510	179	45.83799°N 15.43384°E	
Rubinićeva špilja 1	1	13	Caving certification required.	HR00898		45.81°N 15.68°E	
Rubinićeva špilja 2	2	6	Caving certification required.	HR00899		45.81°N 15.68°E	
Rupa na Rovišču	20	35	No certification required.	SI08651	514	45.81918°N 15.44547°E	
Ponor Vrulje	17	460 (Note: 431)	Caving certification required. Danger! Waste.	HR01382		45.684445°N 15.447278°E	(Note: ˙˙˙˙)
Provala	55	2161 (Note: 1862)	Caving certification required. Gated.	HR00758		45.69°N 15.43°E	(Note: ˙˙˙˙˙˙˙˙˙˙˙˙)
Pušina (Note: Ilasova jama)	56	? (Note: 328)	Caving certification required.	HR00625, HR02783		45.74989°N 15.36146°E (Note: Alt. 45.74058°N 15.35653°E)	(Note: ˙˙˙˙˙)
Paracepinka	2	6.6	Caving certification required.	HR03837		45.75°N 15.36°E	
Rakićka (Note: Rakička)	11	111	Caving certification required. Danger! Waste. Danger! Biowaste.	HR01383		45.707809°N 15.305027°E	(Note: ˙˙)
Rogovac (Note: Polamanica, Spilja kod Lovića Prekriškog)	0	90	Caving certification required.	HR00704		45.6743699°N 15.4444453°E	(Note: ˙˙˙˙˙˙)
Senovac	0	73	Caving certification required.	HR03584		45.72°N 15.31°E	
Skalno brezno na Rasnu	8	14	No certification required.	SI12459	395	45.71838°N 15.14515°E	
Slapenik (Note: Izvor spilja Slapenik)	0	6	Caving certification required.	HR03560		45.69°N 15.32°E	(Note: ˙˙)
Slatki grijeh	14	31	Caving certification required.	HR02831		45.72°N 15.28°E	
Smrdeča štirna	11	11	No certification required. Danger! Waste.	SI09620	358	45.76852°N 15.23638°E	
Smrdljivka	12	12	No certification required.	SI07895	289	45.72817°N 15.15218°E	
Sovina jama (Note: Trlice)	29	29	No certification required.	SI05060	810	45.80053°N 15.44639°E	
Spodmol pri Bizjakovi jami	8	28	No certification required.	SI07395	163	45.83898°N 15.43351°E	
Srimuš	14	20	Caving certification required. Danger! Waste.	HR00914		45.820506°N 15.502552°E	(Note: ˙˙)
Srobotniško brezno	11	20	No certification required.	SI09705	253	45.78588°N 15.23147°E	
Stezijska jama	6	6	No certification required. Danger! Waste.	SI07509	477	45.69011°N 15.21035°E	
Straško brezno	78	78	No certification required. Danger! Waste.	SI04372	249	45.75362°N 15.09244°E	
Stričanica špilja						Kalj	
Stričanka	11	11	No certification required. Damaged or destroyed.	SI00385	791	45.79492°N 15.4555°E	
Strunina jama	8	10	Caving certification required.	HR04108		45.760532°N 15.367073°E	
Stublenka	1	?	Caving certification required.	HR03357		45.72°N 15.32°E	
Šajatovka							
Šimcevo brezno	12	16	No certification required.	SI09748	325	45.7702°N 15.26296°E	
Širbenjsko brezno	18	18	No certification required.	SI13742	790	45.71532°N 15.25977°E	
Škedljeva rupa	24	42	No certification required.	SI12936	251	45.82827°N 15.36512°E	
Škiljanovka	24	?	Caving certification required.	HR00706		45.68°N 15.46°E	(Note: ˙)
Škrinjica	15	110	No certification required.	SI09294	285	45.77554°N 15.24299°E	
Šnajderova luknja	0	26	Caving certification required. Danger! Waste.	HR00900		45.811143°N 15.6926267°E	(Note: ˙˙)
Šobatovićka (Note: Šobatovićeva jama)	2	7	Caving certification required.	HR01666		45.7678°N 15.5223°E	(Note: ˙)
Špilja Gojkova draga	3	?	Caving certification required.	HR01377		45.7766°N 15.5135°E	(Note: ˙˙˙)
Špilja iznad izvora 1	3	11	Caving certification required.	HR03708		45.69°N 15.47°E	
Špilja iznad izvora 1	0	16.8	Caving certification required.	HR03786		45.69°N 15.47°E	{
Špilja iznad kuće Janka Mišića (Note: Špilja u Mišićevu vrtu)	0	12.4	Caving certification required.	HR03900		45.81°N 15.70°E	(Note: ˙)
Špilja izvor Pećine	0	16	Caving certification required.	HR01679		45.7607°N 15.4306°E	(Note: ˙˙)
Špilja Izvor pod pećinom	0	157	Caving certification required.	HR03919		45.72°N 15.33°E	(Note: ˙)
Špilja kod izvora Točak	1	?	Caving certification required.	HR01682		45.7274°N 15.3198°E	(Note: ˙˙˙)
Špilja kod Juraševe livade	0	40	Caving certification required.	HR03738		45.74212°N 15.31211°E	(Note: ˙˙˙˙)
Špilja kod Kordića Žumberačkih	1	?	Caving certification required.	HR01683		45.72329°N 15.38089°E	(Note: ˙˙)
Špilja kod starog mlina na Kamenici	0	?	Caving certification required.	HR03375		45.66°N 15.39°E	
Špilja kod šiljaka							
Špilja kod turske kule u naselju Gorica	0	12	Caving certification required.	HR00163		45.72°N 15.59°E	
Špilja kod turske kule 2	0	8.8	Caving certification required.	HR00166		45.72°N 15.59°E	
Špilja Mramor	0	30	Caving certification required.	HR01997		45.73899°N 15.49714°E	(Note: ˙˙)
Špilja na izvoru Slapnice (Note: Pećina na izvoru)	2	7	Caving certification required.	HR02791	250	45.76223°N 15.49509°E	(Note: ˙˙˙)
Špilja na Rulevki	4	11	Caving certification required.	HR00911		45.766271°N 15.707799°E	
Špilja Pečine						45.73544°N 15.35467°E	
Špilja pod Gubešom	2	10	Caving certification required.	HR03753		45.78°N 15.42°E	
Špilja pod Vrajinim stijenama	0	27	Caving certification required.	HR03709		45.77°N 15.42°E	(Note: ˙˙˙)
Špilja potok (Note: 15-176, Izvor špilja pod Burnikom)	0	27	Caving certification required.	HR002798		45.65°N 15.43°E	(Note: ˙˙)
Špilja sa žicom	4	9	Caving certification required. Danger! Waste.	HR00909		45.8127808°N 15.6776407°E	(Note: ˙)
Špilja u Borutki iza Ušivaka	3	8	Caving certification required.	HR02871		45.77°N 15.51°E	(Note: ˙˙)
Špilja u Japagama	0	20	Caving certification required.	HR04009		45.73°N 15.40°E	
Špilja u kamenolomu Otruševac		37				45.82099°N 15.67943°E	(Note: ˙)
Špilja u Lukama	6	52	Caving certification required.	HR04061		45.67°N 15.47°E	(Note: ˙)
Štefaničevo brezno	20	20	No certification required. Danger! Waste.	SI02871	375	45.69712°N 15.3099°E	
Štojsova jama 1	4	8.5	Caving certification required.	HR03822		45.78°N 15.43°E	
Štojsova jama 2	5	7	Caving certification required.	HR03705		45.78°N 15.42°E	
Štojsova jazavčarka (Note: Štojsova jazavčarka 1)	1	7.4	Caving certification required.	HR03913		45.77°N 15.43°E	
Šulnovka	45	80	No certification required.	SI00855	373	45.69457°N 15.33731°E	
Talarnica (Note: Talerka)	19	30	No certification required.	SI00862	458	45.70591°N 15.33772°E	
Tandaračina jama	42	?	Caving certification required.	HR00718		45.75°N 15.54°E	
Tomaševićka (Note: Tomaševička, Tomaševića ponor)	44	?	Caving certification required.	HR01376		45.7930°N 15.42855°E	(Note: ˙˙˙˙)
Tončikova jama	25	25	No certification required. Danger! Waste.	SI00852	435	45.69632°N 15.33089°E	
Treseljček	1	13	No certification required.	SI01356	198	45.76774°N 15.2073°E	
Tri patrole	1	19	Caving certification required.	HR02782		45.65°N 15.39°E	
Trioglato brezno	14	19	No certification required.	SI09033	515	45.65613°N 15.15833°E	
Trlice 3	15	15	No certification required.	SI08714	661	45.8078°N 15.4511°E	
Udor na Širokem kotlu (Note: Udor na spodnji Koroški gmajni)	4	4	No certification required.	SI05566	260	45.75625°N 15.19134°E	
Udor pri Malem Cerovcu	33	35	No certification required.	SI14754	324	45.74872°N 15.22189°E	
Urbičevo brezno	10	10	No certification required.	SI08552	510	45.66836°N 15.17964°E	
Uršna jama	26	58	No certification required.	SI06337	367	45.69853°N 15.14481°E	
V Mačkovi dolini 1	18	20	No certification required.	SI07870	526	45.70891°N 15.17022°E	
V Mačkovi dolini 2	6	10	No certification required.	SI07871	550	45.70958°N 15.17222°E	
V Mačkovi dolini 3	13	13	No certification required.	SI07872	550	45.70985°N 15.17235°E	
Velika jama na Ljubnu	20	56	No certification required.	SI02326	508	45.74291°N 15.11531°E	
Velika jaruga	26	32	Danger! Waste.			45.808420°N 15.672917°E	(Note: ˙˙)
Veliki Škrbec (Note: Veliki Škerbec)	13	16	No certification required.	SI04998	750	45.70619°N 15.20907°E	
Velikonočno brezno	8	11	No certification required.	SI08713	705	45.80606°N 15.45274°E	
Vilijevo brezno	34	54	No certification required.	SI09708	746	45.80343°N 15.44874°E	
Vilinske jame (Note: Viline jame)	0	40.9	Caving certification required.	HR03906		45.790°N 15.615°E	(Note: ˙˙˙˙˙˙˙˙˙˙˙˙˙˙)
Vilnica	4	11.3	Caving certification required.	HR00154		45.77°N 15.70°E	
Vodno brezno	12	12	No certification required.	SI04577	220	45.76643°N 15.07874°E	
Votlina v predoru Semič	16	38	No certification required. Danger! Waste.	SI10189	345	45.65263°N 15.16909°E	
Vranja peč	1	15	No certification required.	SI05573	592	45.76099°N 15.2757°E	
Vranjačka špilja (Note: Spilja pod Vranjačkim slapom, Vranjačka pećina, Čolića špilja)	0	22	Caving certification required.	HR03619		45.74829°N 15.50214°E	(Note: ˙˙˙˙˙˙˙˙)
Vrbovško brezno	13	15	No certification required. Buried.	SI08381	242	45.8284°N 15.36654°E	
Vrelo pod Strašnim stranama (Note: Izvor špilja Žumberak)	6	45.3	Caving certification required.	HR02842		45.80°N 15.47°E	(Note: ˙)
Vrtaška jama	7	8	No certification required.	SI05024	714	45.77324°N 15.29876°E	
Vučak	1	35	Caving certification required.	HR03770		45.69°N 15.44°E	(Note: ˙˙)
Vugrinova špilja	2	50	Caving certification required.	HR00908		45.7737403°N 15.7011659°E	(Note: ˙˙˙)
Vugrinšćak	5	?	Danger! Waste.			45.799415°N 15.699506°E	
Vuzelnica	1	58	No certification required.	SI10171	366	45.69544°N 15.36374°E	
Za nalož špilja	0	?	Caving certification required.	HR03364		45.78°N 15.41°E	
Zapalača	10	?	Caving certification required.	HR01378		45.804°N 15.486°E	(Note: ˙)
Zdenac (Note: Poluspilja Zdenac)	0	6.5	Caving certification required.	HR03950		45.77°N 15.53°E	
Zidane pećine (Note: Zazidane pećine, Zazidane jame, Zidana špilja)	4	?	Caving certification required.	HR01726	507	45.74829°N 15.50214°E	(Note: ˙˙˙˙˙˙˙˙˙˙˙˙˙)
Zjot	38	45	No certification required. Danger! Waste.	SI06277	435	45.69627°N 15.22103°E	
Znetva kod Rajićeve vode	9	?	Caving certification required.	HR01677		45.7622°N 15.5182°E	(Note: ˙)
Znetva na Velikom Lomniku (Note: Jama kod lugarnice na Velikom Lomniku)	16	?	Caving certification required. Danger! Waste.	HR01380		45.773793°N 15.592697°E	(Note: ˙˙)
Znetva na Zminjaku	9	?	Caving certification required. Danger! Waste.	HR01663		45.773117°N 15.534263°E	(Note: ˙˙)
Znetva Pištavac	29	?	Caving certification required.	HR00916		45.7899°N 15.5002°E	(Note: ˙)
Znetva Spašenac (Note: Znetva na Noršićkoj Plešivici)	12	?	Caving certification required. Danger! Waste.	HR01339		45.796962°N 15.565758°E	(Note: ˙˙)
Znetva u Bubanjkinoj dragi (Note: Spilja pri Svetom Ivanu)	11	?	Caving certification required.	HR01381		45.7663°N 15.5320°E	(Note: ˙)
Znetva u Dragama	7	?	Caving certification required.	HR01662		45.77781°N 15.52884°E	(Note: ˙˙)
Zverina	16	?	Caving certification required. Danger! Waste.	HR02453		45.681274°N 15.445019°E	(Note: ˙˙˙)
Žanov tuš	12	20	No certification required.	SI09749	719	45.73889°N 15.26761°E	
Židovske kuće kod Cerovice (Note: Židovske jame, Cerovica špilja)	4	?	Caving certification required. Danger! Waste.	HR00689		45.809202°N 15.476262°E	(Note: ˙˙˙˙˙)
Židovske kuće kod Budinjaka (Note: Židovske jame, Židovske kuće)	8	31	Caving certification required.	HR03404	741	45.79752°N 15.50569°E	(Note: ˙˙˙˙˙˙˙˙˙˙˙˙˙˙˙˙˙˙˙˙˙)
Žlota						Ferenci	
Župenca (Note: Uhanova jama)	20	26	No certification required. Danger! Waste.	SI02363	266	45.75145°N 15.11534°E	

== See also ==
- List of Dinaric caves

== Notes ==
=== Legend ===
Dry cave (Note: Rarely flooded.)	Partly wet cave (Note: At least one entrance dry but at least one passage with flowing water.)	Wet cave (Note: At least one entrance rarely dry.)	Submerged cave (Note: Rarely exposed.)	Cave with complex hydrological regime (Note: For example with seasonal variation.)

== Literature ==
- Dujmović, Ivan (2007). Fizičko-geografske značajke Samoborskog gorja i Plješivičkog prigorja. ISBN 978-953-239-069-8.
- Božić, Vladimir (1987). "Kuda na speleološki izlet? - u Samoborsko i Žumberačko gorje" [Where to go on a Speleological Holiday? in the Samobor and Žumberak Mountains]. Bilogorski planinar (in Croatian). No. 22. Koprivnica. pp. 10–15.
- Marjanac, Slavko (1972). "Speleološki objekti u plitkom kršu Žumberačkog i Samoborskog gorja". Naše jame (13): 79–83. ISSN 0547-311X.
- Šuklje, Fran (1938). "U kršu Samoborske gore". Priroda. Vol. 28, no. 1. pp. 10–14.
- Šuklje, Fran (1929). "Pabirci iz geologije Samoborske gore". Vijesti geološkog zavoda u Zagrebu. 3: 106–114.
- Šuklje, Fran (1913). "Pojava krasa u samoborskoj okolici". Samoborski list. Vol. 8, no. 34. pp. 1–2.
- Reizer, Nikola (1911). "Pojava krša u samoborskoj okolici". Glasnik Hrvatskoga prirodoslovnoga društva. 23 (3): 22–39.
