= Trebinje =

City in Republika Srpska, Bosnia and Herzegovina

Trebinje Требиње (Serbian)
- City
- Grad Trebinje; Град Требиње; City of Trebinje
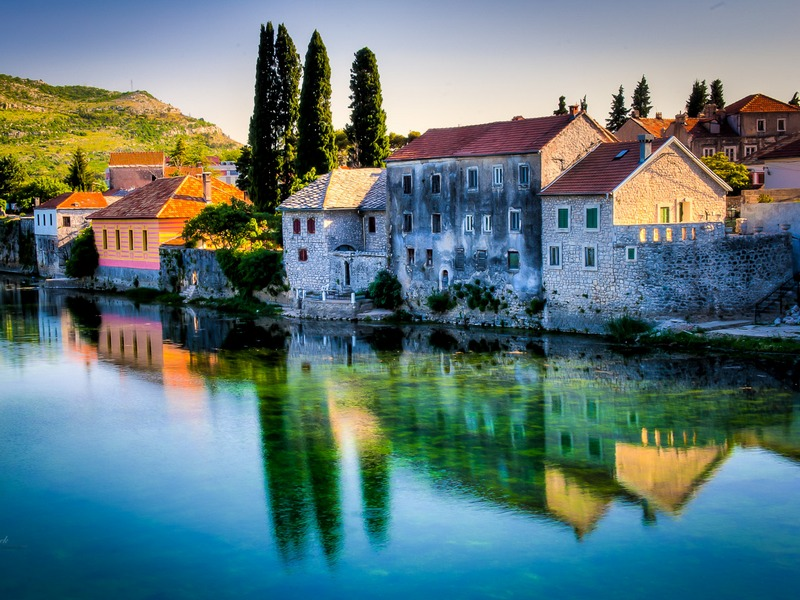
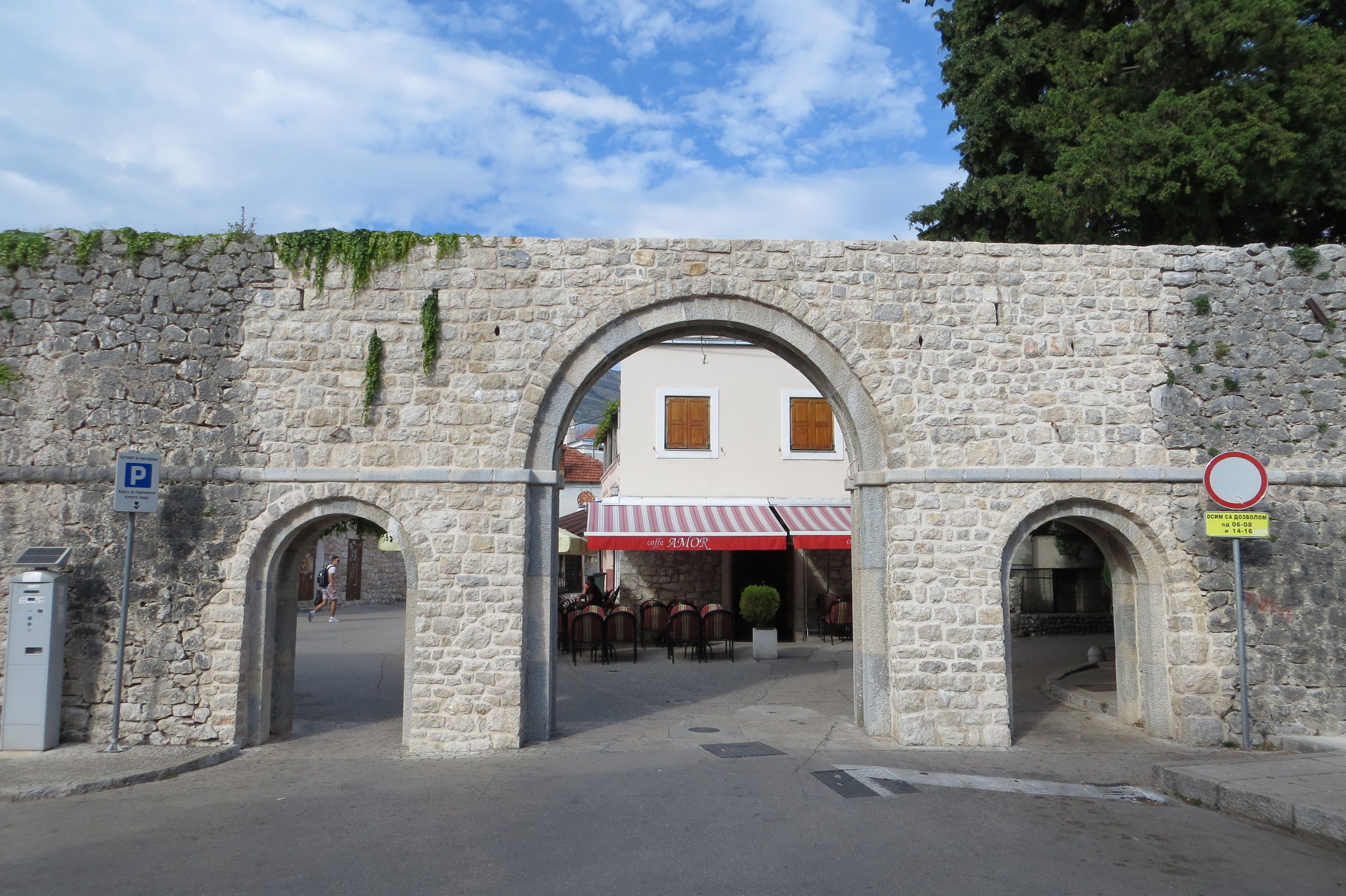
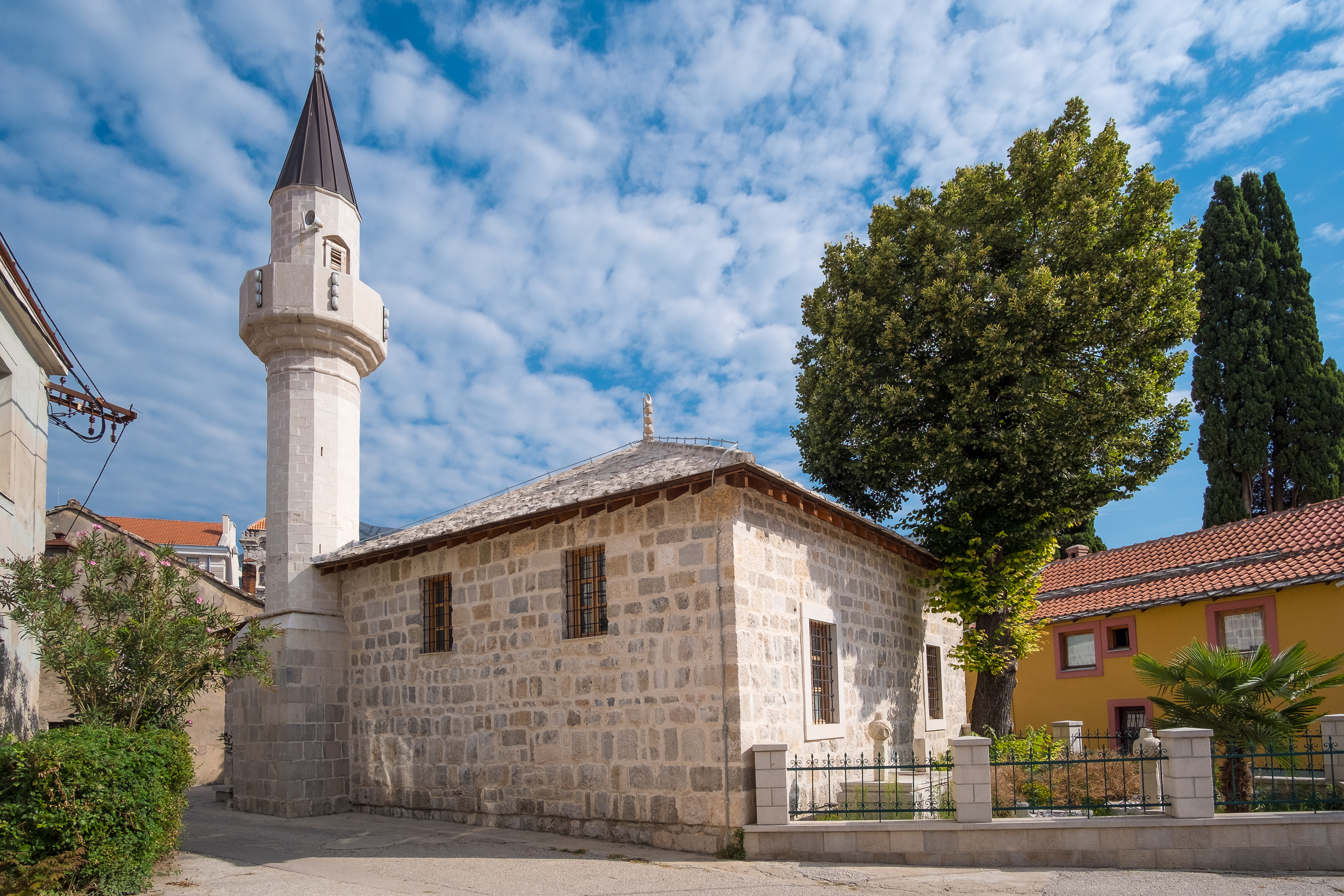
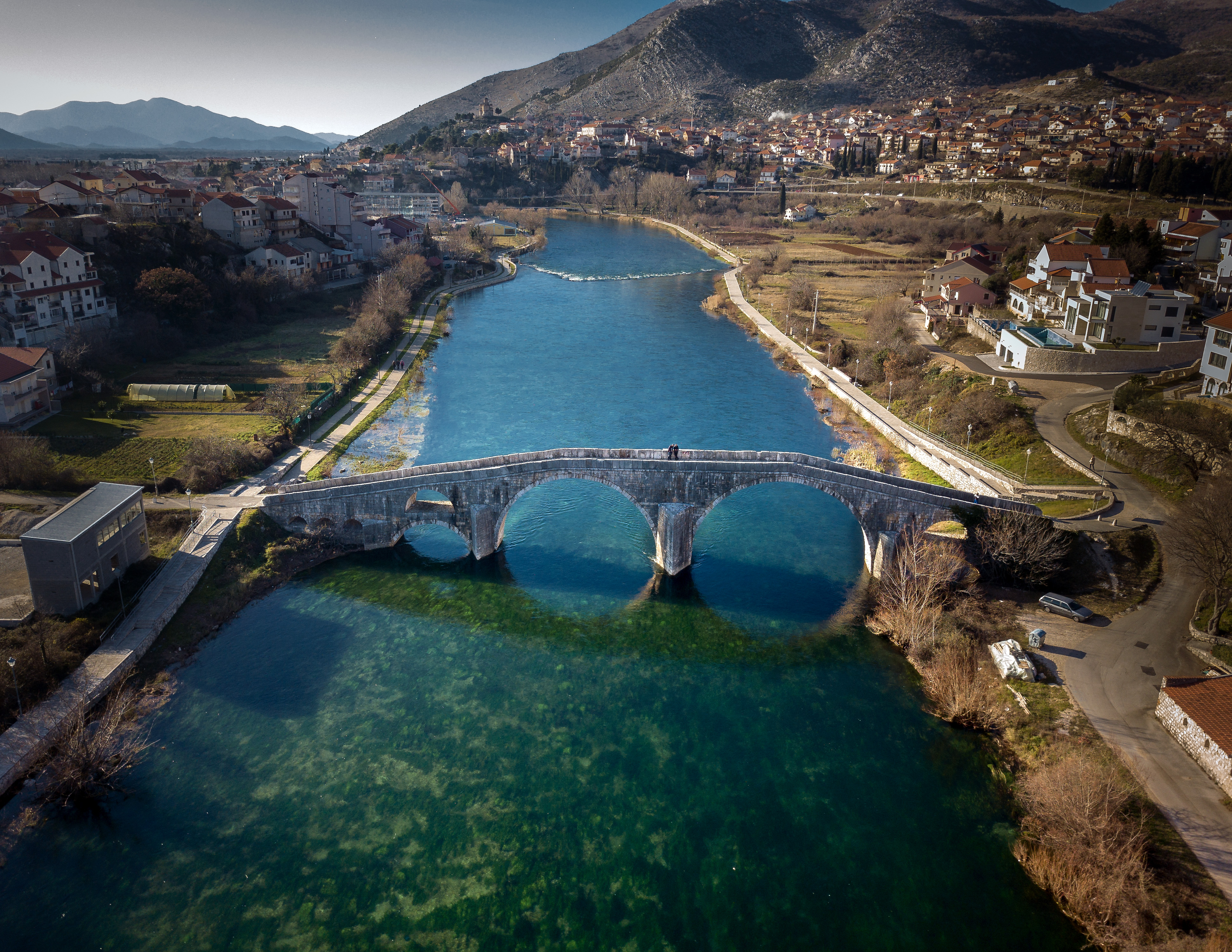
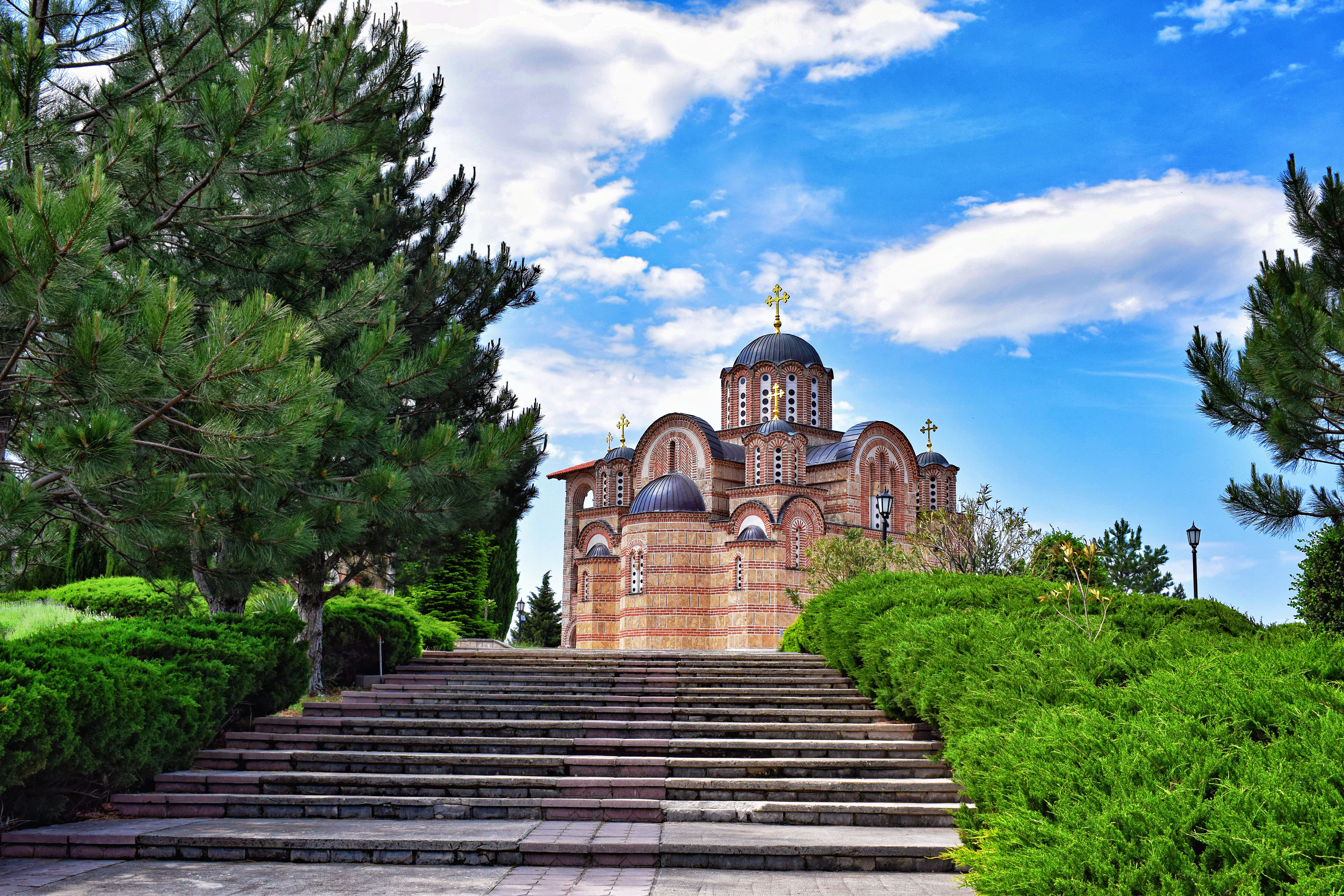
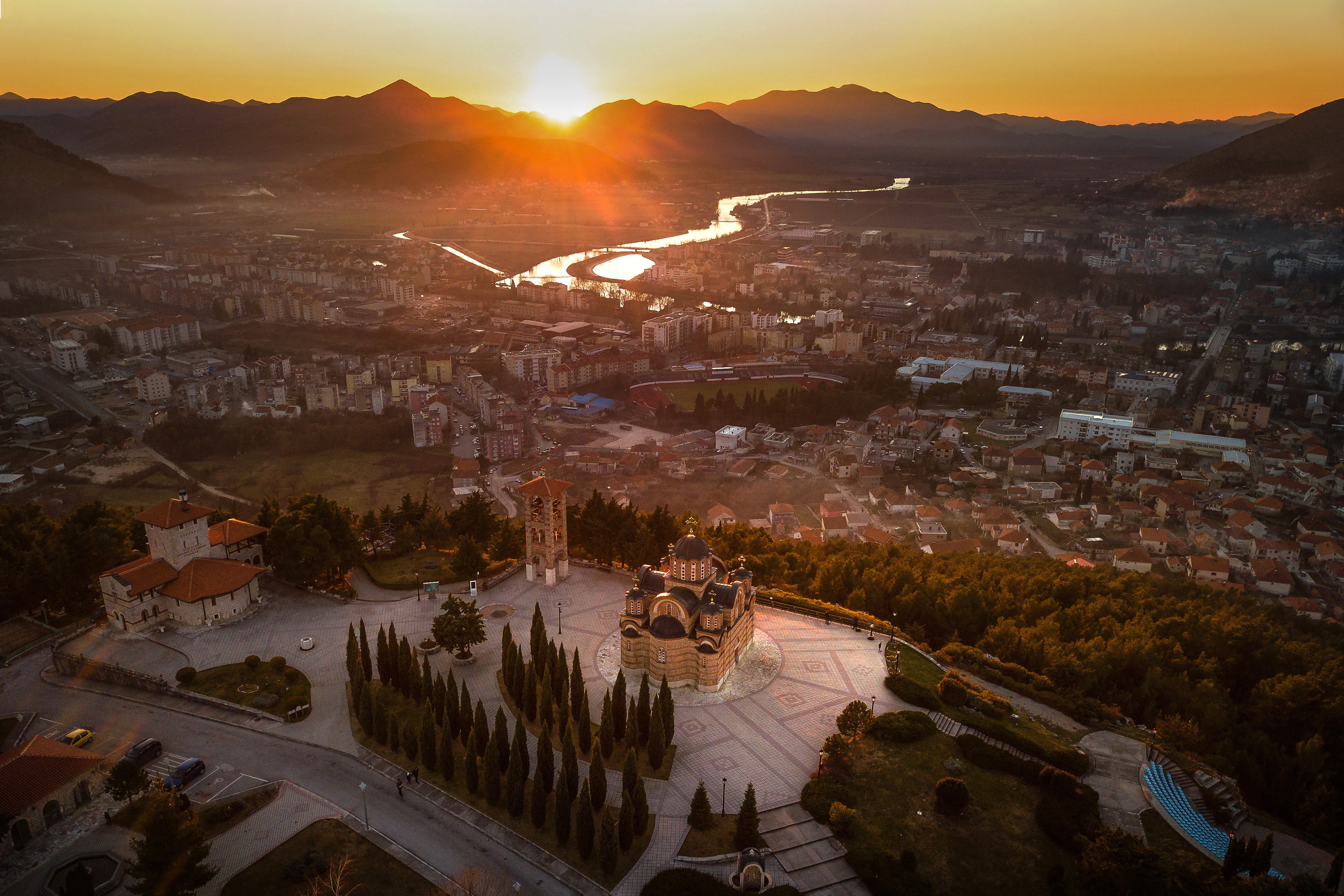
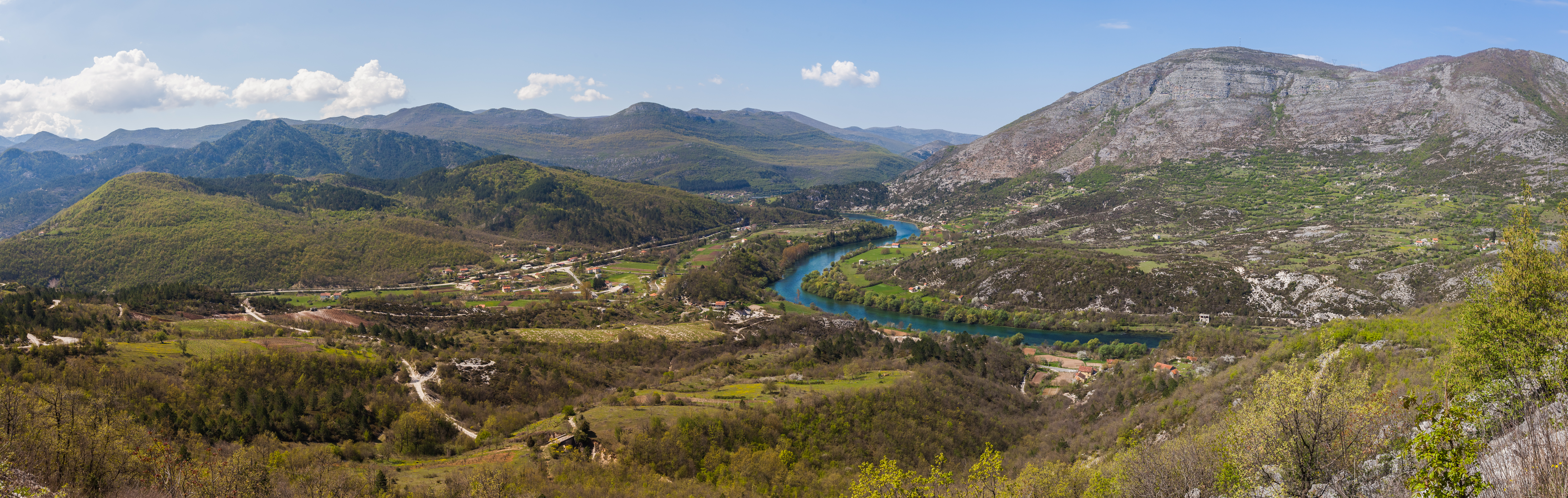
- Clockwise, from top: View of Trebišnjica from Gornji Orahovac, Sultan Ahmed's mosque, Old town, Hercegovačka Gračanica, Panorama of Trebinje, Arslanagić Bridge

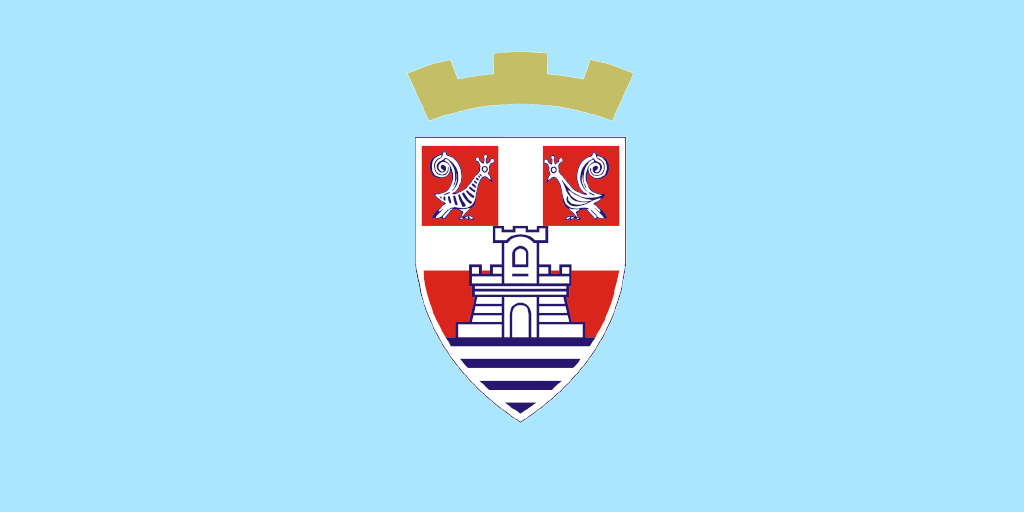
- Flag Coat of arms

- Location of Trebinje within Bosnia and Herzegovina

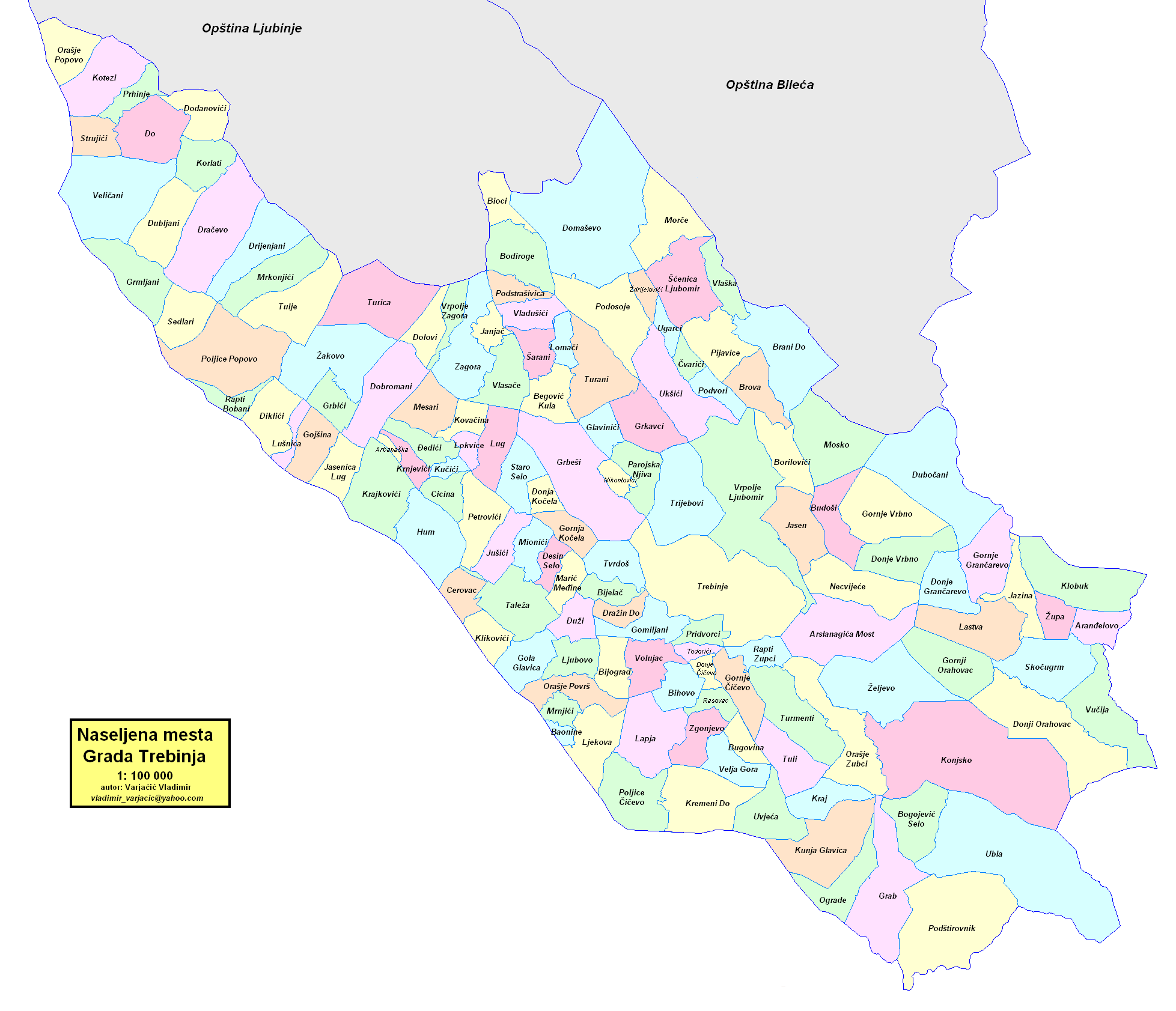

- Location within Bosnia and Herzegovina
- Coordinates: 42°42′43″N 18°20′46″E
- Country: Bosnia and Herzegovina
- Entity: Republika Srpska
- Geographical region: Herzegovina
- City status: July 2012
- Settlements: 178

Government
  - Mayor: Mirko Ćurić (SNSD)

Area
  - City: 854.05 km^{2} (329.75 sq mi)
- Elevation: 275 m (902 ft)

Population (2013 Census)
  - City: 31,433
  - Density: 36.8/km^{2} (95/sq mi)
  - Urban: 25,589
- Time zone: UTC+1 (CET)
  - Summer (DST): UTC+2 (CEST)
- Area code: +387 59
- Website: www.trebinje.rs.ba

Trebinje (Serbian Cyrillic: Требиње, pronounced [trěːbiɲe]) is a city and municipality in Republika Srpska, Bosnia and Herzegovina. It is the southernmost city in Bosnia and Herzegovina and is situated on the banks of the Trebišnjica river in the region of East Herzegovina. As of 2013, it has a population of 31,433 inhabitants. The city's old town quarter, the Walled town of Trebinje, dates to the 18th-century Ottoman period and includes the Arslanagić Bridge on the Trebišnjica River, as of recently also known as Perovića Bridge. The city is one of the region’s popular tourist spots.

== Geography ==
=== Physical geography ===
The city lies in the Trebišnjica river valley, at the foot of Leotar, in southeastern Herzegovina, some 30 km (19 mi) by road from Dubrovnik, Croatia, on the Adriatic coast. There are several mills along the river, as well as several bridges, including three in the city of Trebinje itself, as well as a historic Ottoman Arslanagić Bridge nearby. The river is heavily exploited for hydro-electric energy. After it passes through the Popovo Polje area southwest of the city, the river – which always floods in the winter – naturally runs underground to the Adriatic, near Dubrovnik. Trebinje is known as "the city of the sun and plane-trees", and it is said to be one of the most beautiful cities in Bosnia and Herzegovina. The city is the economic and cultural center of the region of East Herzegovina.

=== Political geography ===
The Trebinje municipality is located in the most southern part of Republika Srpska and borders the municipalities of Bileća, Ljubinje, and Ravno in Herzegovina-Neretva Canton of the Federation of Bosnia and Herzegovina. The Trebinje municipality has an area of 904 km^{2} and makes up 3.68% of the total territory of the Republic of Srpska.

=== Climate ===
Trebinje experiences a humid subtropical climate (Cfa) with heavy precipitation, typical of the southern Adriatic coastal areas.

Climate data for Trebinje (1991–2020)
Month	Jan	Feb	Mar	Apr	May	Jun	Jul	Aug	Sep	Oct	Nov	Dec	Year
Record high °C (°F)	20.6 (69.1)	21.9 (71.4)	25.3 (77.5)	28.5 (83.3)	33.5 (92.3)	39.0 (102.2)	41.1 (106.0)	42.5 (108.5)	36.5 (97.7)	31.5 (88.7)	26.3 (79.3)	20.9 (69.6)	42.5 (108.5)
Mean daily maximum °C (°F)	10.5 (50.9)	11.7 (53.1)	14.9 (58.8)	18.5 (65.3)	23.6 (74.5)	28.5 (83.3)	31.5 (88.7)	31.9 (89.4)	26.0 (78.8)	21.3 (70.3)	16.1 (61.0)	11.6 (52.9)	20.5 (68.9)
Daily mean °C (°F)	5.9 (42.6)	6.8 (44.2)	9.7 (49.5)	13.2 (55.8)	17.8 (64.0)	22.7 (72.9)	25.3 (77.5)	25.4 (77.7)	19.8 (67.6)	15.6 (60.1)	11.2 (52.2)	7.0 (44.6)	15.0 (59.1)
Mean daily minimum °C (°F)	2.3 (36.1)	2.8 (37.0)	5.6 (42.1)	8.8 (47.8)	12.9 (55.2)	17.4 (63.3)	19.8 (67.6)	20.0 (68.0)	15.0 (59.0)	11.3 (52.3)	7.5 (45.5)	3.6 (38.5)	10.6 (51.0)
Record low °C (°F)	−10.5 (13.1)	−8.4 (16.9)	−7.0 (19.4)	−2.7 (27.1)	4.5 (40.1)	6.4 (43.5)	9.0 (48.2)	10.0 (50.0)	7.0 (44.6)	1.8 (35.2)	−4.8 (23.4)	−7.4 (18.7)	−10.5 (13.1)
Average precipitation mm (inches)	164.4 (6.47)	157.6 (6.20)	150.2 (5.91)	110.4 (4.35)	83.6 (3.29)	62.6 (2.46)	51.8 (2.04)	68.3 (2.69)	137.6 (5.42)	182.4 (7.18)	206.7 (8.14)	200.6 (7.90)	1,576.2 (62.05)
Mean monthly sunshine hours	130	133	176	194	249	289	336	312	236	184	133	112	2,484
Source 1:
Source 2: World Meteorological Organization

== History ==
=== Middle Ages ===
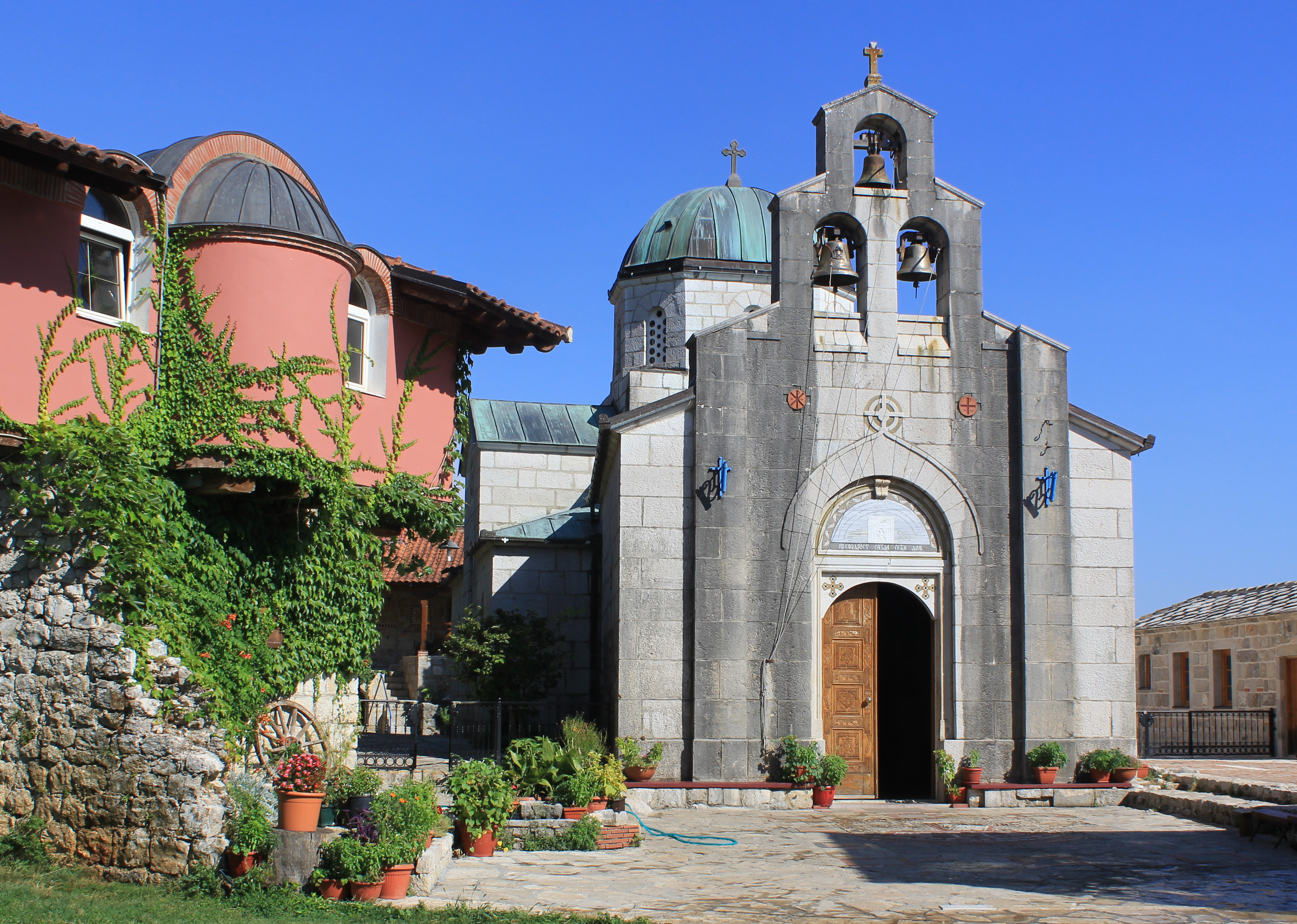
Serbian Orthodox Tvrdoš Monastery, founded in the 15th century.

Tribulium was the original name for this settlement, and the etymology of it may be analyzed as tri-bulium, or the place of the 'three hills', from the numeral 'three' (*trei-) and an appellative derived from the IE root *b(h)eu- 'to swell, puff.

De Administrando Imperio by Constantine VII (913–959) mentioned Travunija (Τερβουνια). Serbian Prince Vlastimir (r. 830–51) married his daughter to Krajina, the son of Beloje, and that family became hereditary rulers of Travunija. By 1040, Stefan Vojislav's state stretched in the coastal region from Ston in the north, down to his capital, Skadar, set up along the southern banks of the Skadar Lake, with other courts set up in Trebinje, Kotor, and Bar.

The town commanded the road from Ragusa to Constantinople, which was traversed in 1096 by Raymond IV of Toulouse and his crusaders. Trebinje diocese has its episcopal seat in Polje near Trebinje. At the end of the 12th century Stefan Nemanja conquered provinces that include Trebinje. Under the name of Tribunia or Travunja it belonged to the Serbian Kingdom and the Serbian Empire. In 1373, Trebinje was taken by the Balšić noble family, and later it was incorporated into the expanded medieval Bosnian state under Tvrtko I in 1377. There is a medieval tower in Gornje Police whose construction is often attributed to Vuk Branković. The old Tvrdoš Monastery dates back to the 15th century.

Under Bosnian rule, Trebinje became part of Kosača noble family domains. It was conquered by Ottoman forces for the first time in 1465, but already in 1470 it was returned to Vlatko Hercegović Kosača. By 1478, the town was finally captured and incorporated into the Ottoman Empire. The Old Town-Kastel was built by the Ottomans on the location of the medieval fortress of Ban Vir, on the western bank of the Trebišnjica River. The city walls, the Old Town square, and two mosques were built in the beginning of the 18th century by the Resulbegović family. The 16th-century Arslanagić bridge was originally built at the village of Arslanagić, 5 kilometres (3.1 mi) north of the town, by Mehmed-Paša Sokolović, and was run by Arslanagić family for centuries. The Arslanagić Bridge is one of the most attractive Ottoman-era bridges in Bosnia and Herzegovina. It has two large and two small semicircular arches.

Among noble families in the Trebinje region mentioned in Ragusan documents were Ljubibratić, Starčić, Popović, Krasomirić, Preljubović, Poznanović, Dragančić, Kobiljačić, Paštrović, Zemljić and Stanjević.

=== Ottoman era ===
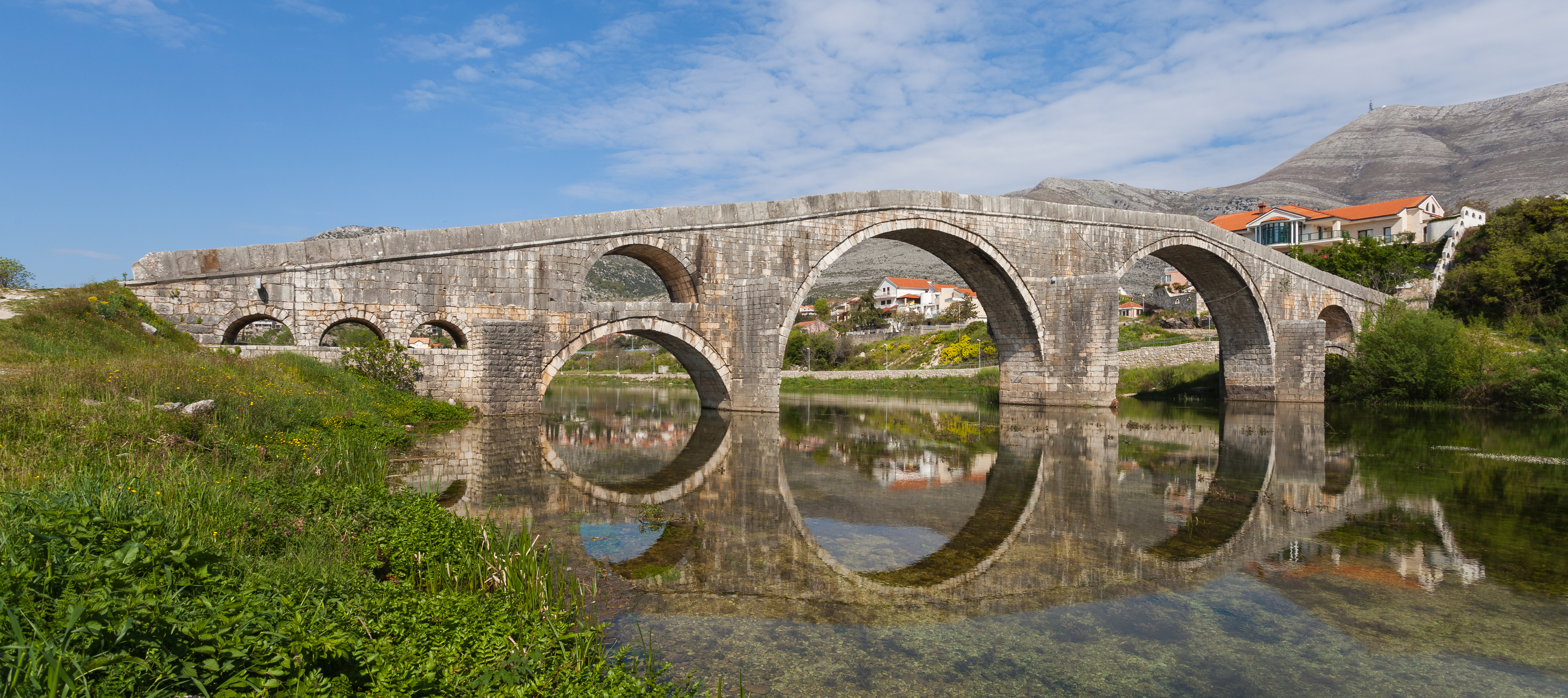
Arslanagića Ćuprija, built in the 17th century

After the fall of Bosnian medieval state, and subsequent Ottoman conquest and capture of Herzegovina in December 1482, Trebinje became part of the Ottoman administrative system, and its urban development gradually reshaped in accordance with the new administrative, military and economic circumstances. Enclosed with the ramparts from the west and the Trebišnjica from the east, the town's walled historical core, also known as the Old Town (Kastel) was formed during the 17th century.

During the Ottoman period, Trebinje began to take shape of an urban settlement, acquiring the characteristics of an Oriental-Mediterranean town, with a čaršija, stone bridges, religious buildings and mahalas. The development of settlements outside the city walls was of particular importance. Siniša Cvijić and Jasna Guzijan state that the mahala Krš, which emerged in the first half of the 18th century, was the first settlement to develop outside the city walls; it grew spontaneously, in accordance with the local relief, and represented a mixture of Mediterranean and Oriental urban life style and cultural influences.

The Ottoman era left a crucial mark on Trebinje's identity, with some of the most recognizable monuments of Trebinje's heritage, such as the Arslanagić Bridge, date back to the Ottoman period. During this period, the town's role grew fast and was consolidated as a local center on the southern communications of Herzegovina.

==== Turmoils and revolts ====
Ottoman Empire rule lasted from 1466 until 1878. The Trebinje region suffered especially in the 16th century, mostly from the hand of uskoks of Senj and various local hajduk bands. The calmer period during the Ottoman rule was the 18th century. On one instance in March 1655, the hajduks in Herzegovina had carried out one of their largest and most devastating operations, raiding Trebinje, taking many slaves and carrying with them out much loot.

The burning of Saint Sava's remains after the Banat Uprising provoked the Serbs in other regions to revolt against the Ottomans. Grdan, the vojvoda of Nikšić, organized revolt with Serbian Patriarch Jovan Kantul. From 1596, the center of anti-Ottoman activity in Herzegovina was the Tvrdoš Monastery in Trebinje, where Metropolitan Visarion was seated. The uprising that broke out in 1596 in Bjelopavlići, spread to Drobnjaci, Nikšić, Piva and Gacko. The rebels were quickly defeated at the field of Gacko the following year.

On 26 November 1716, Austrian general Nastić with 400 soldiers and c. 500 hajduks attacked Trebinje, but did not take it over. A combined Austro-Venetian-Hajduk force of 7,000 stood before the Trebinje walls, defended by 1,000 Ottomans. The Ottomans were busy near Belgrade and with hajduk attacks towards Mostar, and were thus unable to reinforce Trebinje. The conquest of Trebinje and Popovo field were given up to fight in Montenegro. The Venetians took over Hutovo and Popovo, where they immediately recruited militarily from the population.

The Serb elders from Trebinje, together with the people of Nikšić, planned a great uprising in the summer of 1805, under the influence of the First Serbian Uprising. Their project was suppressed by the Ottoman pasha and probably with the help from the local Slavic Muslims.

The Christians of Trebinje, together with the Montenegrins, fought against Napoleon's troops and in several conflicts they managed to defeat the French troops, such as the knife fight which took place on 2–3 October 1806 leaving several thousands of French soldiers dead, after which the French withdrew for a while.

Notable participants in the Herzegovina Uprising (1852–62) from Trebinje include Mićo Ljubibratić.

During the Herzegovina Uprising (1875–77), the Bileća and Trebinje region was led by serdar Todor Mujičić, Gligor Milićević, Vasilj Svorcan and Sava Jakšić.

=== Austria-Hungary ===
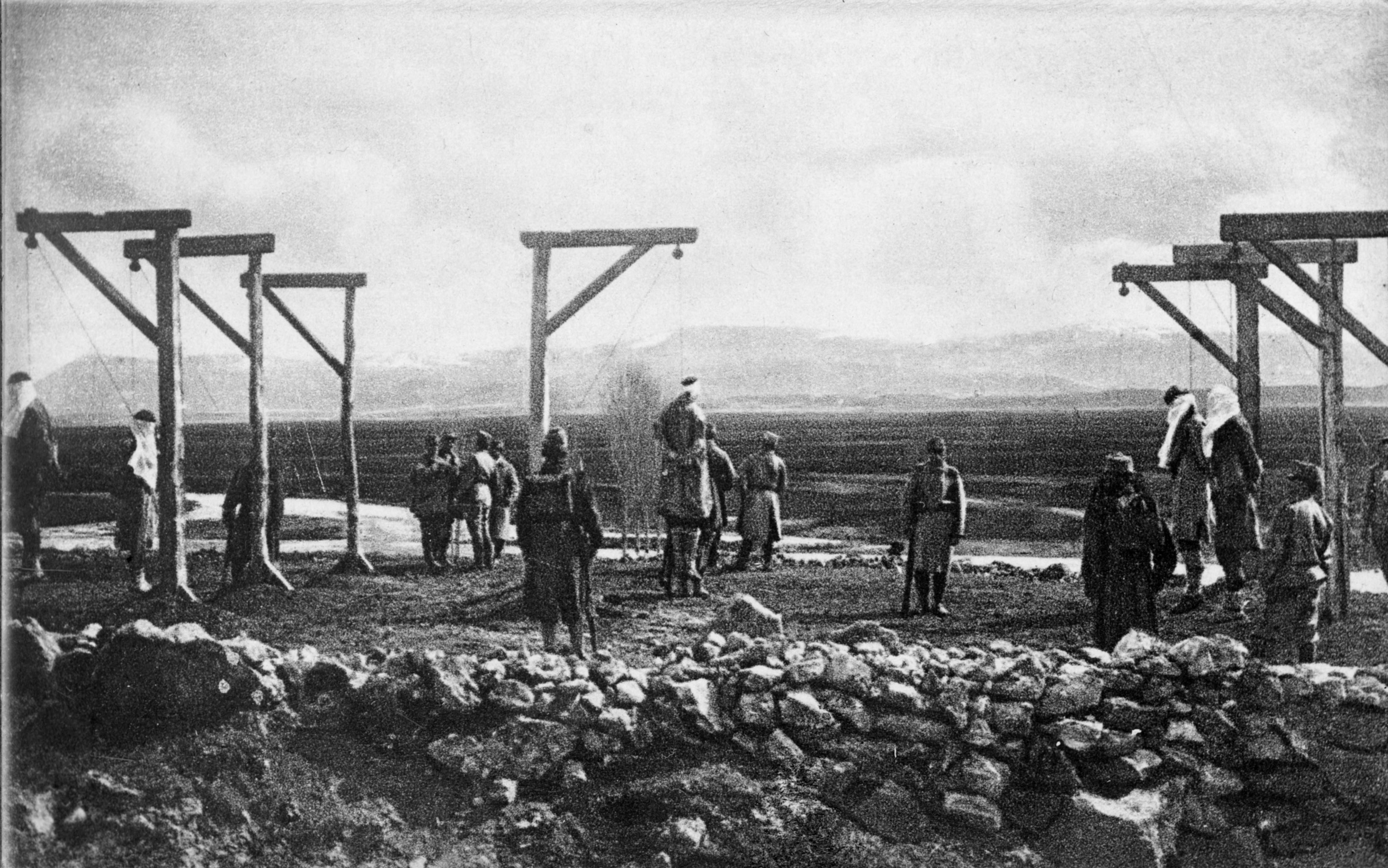
Austro-Hungarian soldiers hanging Serb civilians, 1914

With the Austro-Hungarian occupation of Bosnia and Herzegovina, many reforms took place. New administrative division was introduced and a large number of Austro-Hungarian troops were located in Trebinje, which was seen as a city of strategic value and position. No factories or bigger investments were made in Trebinje during the AU rule.

After the Assassination of Archduke Franz Ferdinand Croat-Muslim volunteer corps (German: Schutzcorp) terrorized Serb civilians of Bogojevići and other villages in Trebinje, which resulted in 83 children killed and 85 adults hanged. Those and related actions resulted in migrations of the local population to Serbia.

During the period of Austro-Hungarian administration (1878–1918), several fortifications were built on the surrounding hills, and there was a garrison based in the town. The imperial administrators also modernized the town, expanding it westwards, building the present main street, as well as several squares, parks, schools, tobacco plantations, etc.

=== SFR Yugoslavia (1945–92) ===
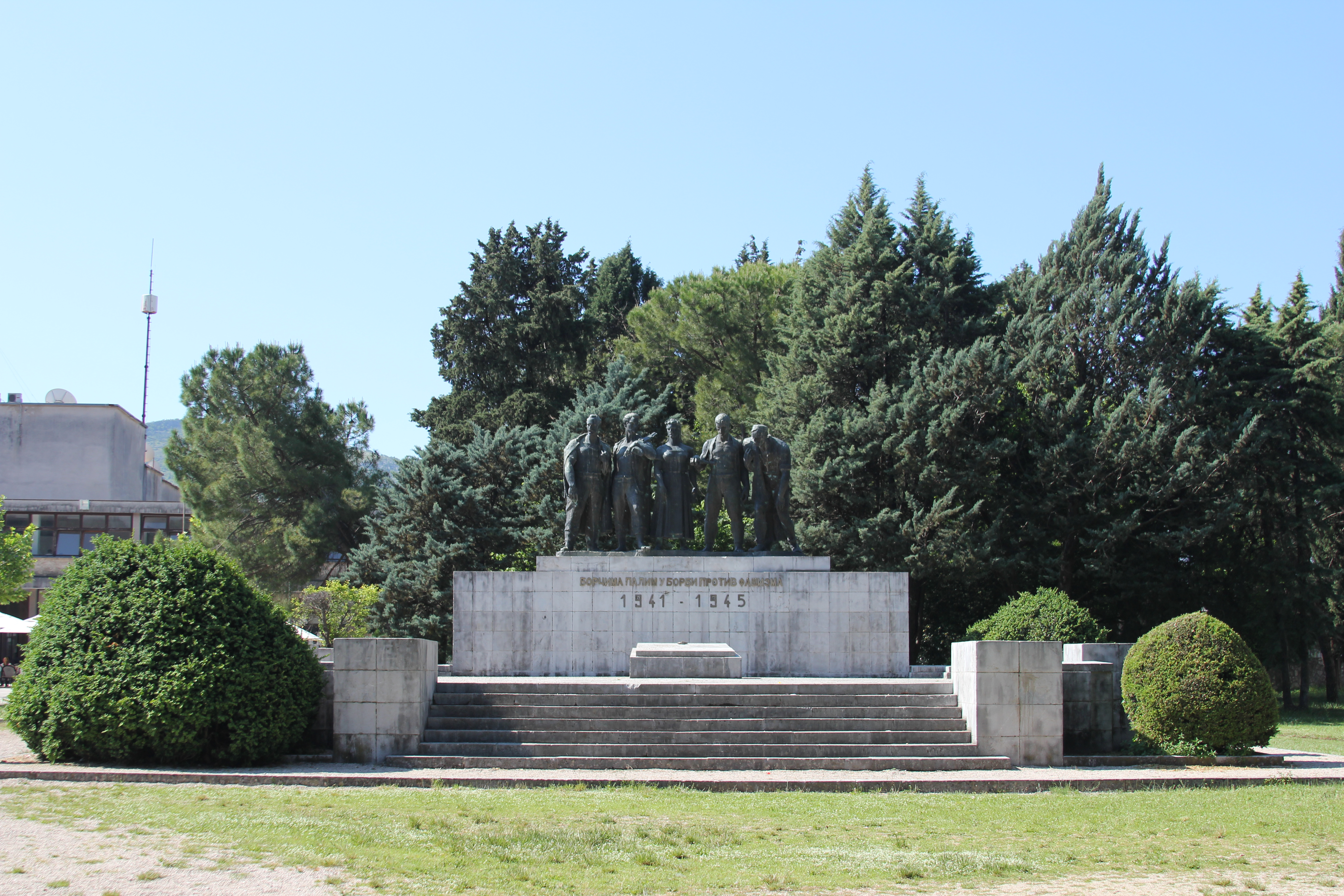
Monument dedicated to the fighters who died during the struggle against fascism in 1941–1945

Trebinje grew rapidly in the era of Josip Broz Tito's Socialist Federal Republic of Yugoslavia between 1945 and 1980. It especially developed its hydroelectric potential with dams, artificial lakes, tunnels, and hydroelectric plants. This industrial development brought a large increase in the urban population of Trebinje.

=== Bosnian War (1992–95) ===
Trebinje was the largest town in Serb-held eastern Herzegovina during the Bosnian War. It was controlled by Bosnian Serb forces from the fall of 1991, and was used as a major command and artillery base by Yugoslav People's Army (JNA) troops besieging the Croatian town of Dubrovnik. In 1992 Trebinje was declared the capital of the self-proclaimed Serbian Autonomous Region of Herzegovina (Serbian: Српска аутономна област Херцеговина). Bosniak residents were subsequently conscripted to fight with the JNA. Some remained in the first year of the war while others began to leave. A purported instruction dated 20 January 1993, attributed to the Party of Democratic Action (SDA) and its former secretary-general Hasan Čengić, called upon party activists to encourage their own Muslim residents, particularly prominent and wealthy individuals, to leave Trebinje for Rožaje, Montenegro. The document also instructed: "Do not shy away from using pressure or even force against Muslims who do not observe this order." The appeal described Trebinje as "our dear and always Bosniak-Muslim Trebinje" and declared that its supporters would "triumphantly return" with the help of Allah, Bosnia and Herzegovina, and their allies.

Even though there was no fighting in immediate vicinity, ten of the town's mosques were deliberately razed to the ground with explosives during this period.

==== Trebinje Front ====
Statue of Nedeljko Vidaković (1966–1994), commander of the Bobani Company of the Trebinje Brigade. The monument was unveiled in 2014.

Considerable fighting also took place in the mountainous countryside west and southwest of Trebinje during 1992. Following the withdrawal of the Yugoslav People's Army from much of the area in May, the Croatian Army (HV) launched operations intended to push Bosnian Serb forces away from Dubrovnik and secure the surrounding high ground. During Operation Tiger in July 1992, Croatian forces captured several important positions, but further advances toward Popovo Polje and Trebinje encountered sustained resistance from the Army of Republika Srpska (VRS).

The Trebinje Brigade, originally designated the 472nd Motorized Brigade and operating within the VRS Herzegovina Corps, defended an extensive front approximately 40 kilometres long with limited reserves. Particularly intense fighting occurred around Rapti Bobani, the southern edge of Popovo Polje, and the strategic heights near Vlaštica. In August 1992, a major Bosnian Serb counterattack temporarily drove back Croatian units near Bobani before Croatian reinforcements recovered much of the lost territory. Renewed Croatian attacks in September achieved only limited gains, and VRS forces retained most of the hill positions protecting Popovo Polje. In its military history of the conflict, the United States Central Intelligence Agency described the brigade's resistance to repeated attacks along such an extensive front as an achievement that "speaks volumes about the tenacity of the Serb defence".

Following the Dayton Agreement in 1995, the Inter-Entity Boundary Line divided the former Trebinje municipality between Republika Srpska and the Federation of Bosnia and Herzegovina along the former frontline.

=== Bosnia and Herzegovina (1995-present) ===
During the late 2010s and the 2020s, Trebinje underwent a notable boom in new apartment construction, with property prices increasing.

In January 2026, a new modern hospital, “Saint Archdeacon Stephen – the 9th January,” was opened in Trebinje, built in cooperation between Republika Srpska entity and Serbia.

== Settlements ==
Trebinje is one of two municipalities created from the former Yugoslav municipality of Trebinje of the 1991 census, the other being Ravno in the Federation of Bosnia and Herzegovina. As of 2018, it has a total of 178 settlements that compose it (including city proper area of Trebinje):

- Aranđelovo
- Arbanaška
- Arslanagića Most
- Baonine
- Begović Kula
- Bihovo
- Bijelač
- Bijograd
- Bioci
- Bodiroge
- Bogojević Selo
- Borlovići
- Brani Do
- Brova
- Budoši
- Bugovina
- Cerovac
- Čvarići
- Desin Selo
- Diklići
- Djedići, Do
- Dobromani
- Dodanovići
- Dolovi
- Domaševo
- Donja Kočela
- Donje Čičevo
- Donje Grančarevo
- Donje Vrbno
- Donji Orahovac
- Dračevo
- Dražin Do
- Drijenjani
- Dubljani
- Dubočani
- Duži
- Glavinići
- Gojšina
- Gola Glavica
- Gomiljani
- Gornja Kočela
- Gornje Čičevo
- Gornje Grančarevo
- Gornje Vrbno
- Gornji Orovac
- Grab
- Grbeši
- Grbići
- Grkavci
- Grmljani
- Hum
- Janjač
- Jasen
- Jasenica Lug
- Jazina
- Jušići
- Klikovići
- Klobuk
- Konjsko
- Korlati
- Kotezi
- Kovačina
- Kraj
- Krajkovići
- Kremeni Do
- Krnjevići
- Kučići
- Kunja Glavica
- Kutina
- Lapja
- Lastva
- Lokvice
- Lomači
- Lug
- Lušnica
- Ljekova
- Ljubovo
- Marić Međine
- Mesari
- Mionići
- Morče
- Mosko
- Mrkonjići
- Mrnjići
- Necvijeće
- Nevada
- Nikontovići
- Ograde
- Orašje Popovo
- Orašje Površ
- Orašje Zubci
- Parojska Njiva
- Petrovići
- Pijavice
- Podosoje
- Podstrašivica
- Podštirovnik
- Podvori
- Poljice Čičevo
- Poljice Popovo
- Prhinje Pridvorci
- Prosjek
- Rapti Bobani
- Rapti Zupci
- Rasovac
- Sedlari
- Skočigrm
- Staro Slano
- Strujići
- Šarani
- Šćenica Ljubomir
- Taleža
- Todorići
- Trebijovi
- Tuli
- Tulje
- Turani
- Turica
- Turmenti
- Tvrdoš
- Ubla
- Ugarci
- Ukšići
- Uskoplje
- Uvjeća
- Veličani
- Velja Gora
- Vladušići
- Vlaka
- Vlasače
- Vlaška
- Volujac
- Vrpolje Ljubomir
- Vrpolje Zagora
- Vučija
- Zagora
- Zavala
- Zgonjevo
- Žakovo
- Ždrijelovići
- Željevo
- Župa
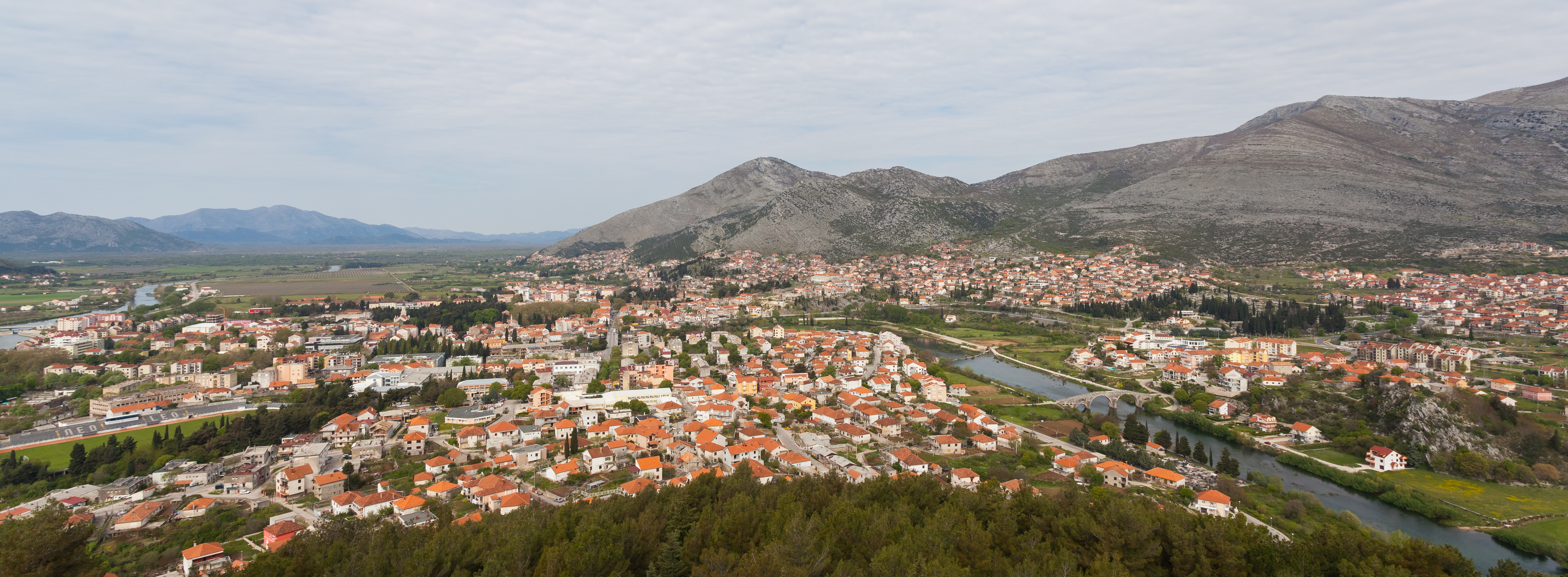
Panorama of Trebinje

== Demographics ==
According to the 2013 census results, the city of Trebinje has 31,433 inhabitants.

=== Population ===
Population of settlements – Trebinje municipality
	Settlement	1948	1953	1961	1971	1981	1991	2013
	Total	27,401	27,720	24,176	29,024	30,372	30,996	31,433
1	Bihovo						658	305
2	Donje Čičevo						258	497
3	Lastva						523	368
4	Pridvorci						419	632
5	Todorići						121	260
6	Trebinje				3,530	17,271	21,870	25,589
7	Vrpolje Ljubomir						73	278

=== Ethnic composition ===
Ethnic composition – Trebinje city
	2013	1991	1981	1971
Total	25,589 (100,0%)	21,870 (100,0%)	17,271 (100,0%)	3,530 (100,0%)
Serbs	22,344 (94%)	14,915 (68,20%)	9,489 (54,94%)	1,788 (50,65%)
Bosniaks	676 (2,8%)	4,228 (19,33%)	3,039 (17,60%)	1,211 (34,31%)
Yugoslavs		1,470 (6,722%)	3,364 (19,48%)	124 (3,513%)
Others	549 (2,3%)	910 (4,161%)	158 (0,915%)	51 (1,445%)
Croats	201 (0,8%)	347 (1,587%)	412 (2,386%)	208 (5,892%)
Montenegrins			727 (4,209%)	120 (3,399%)
Albanians			31 (0,179%)	7 (0,198%)
Macedonians			29 (0,168%)	2 (0,057%)
Slovenes			22 (0,127%)	19 (0,538%)

Ethnic composition – Trebinje municipality
	2013	1991	1981	1971
Total	31,433 (100,0%)	30,966 (100,0%)	30 372 (100,0%)	29,024 (100,0%)
Serbs	27,276 (93,42%)	21,349 (68,94%)	18,123 (59,67%)	19,362 (66,71%)
Bosniaks	995 (3,408%)	5,571 (17,99%)	4,405 (14,50%)	4,846 (16,70%)
Others	632 (2,165%)	1 158 (3,740%)	199 (0,655%)	157 (0,541%)
Croats	295 (1,010%)	1 246 (4,024%)	2,309 (7,602%)	3,350 (11,54%)
Yugoslavs		1 642 (5,303%)	4,280 (14,09%)	424 (1,461%)
Montenegrins			865 (2,848%)	776 (2,674%)
Albanians			119 (0,392%)	59 (0,203%)
Macedonians			36 (0,119%)	18 (0,062%)
Slovenes			22 (0,072%)	32 (0,110%)
Roma			14 (0,046%)	

== Culture ==
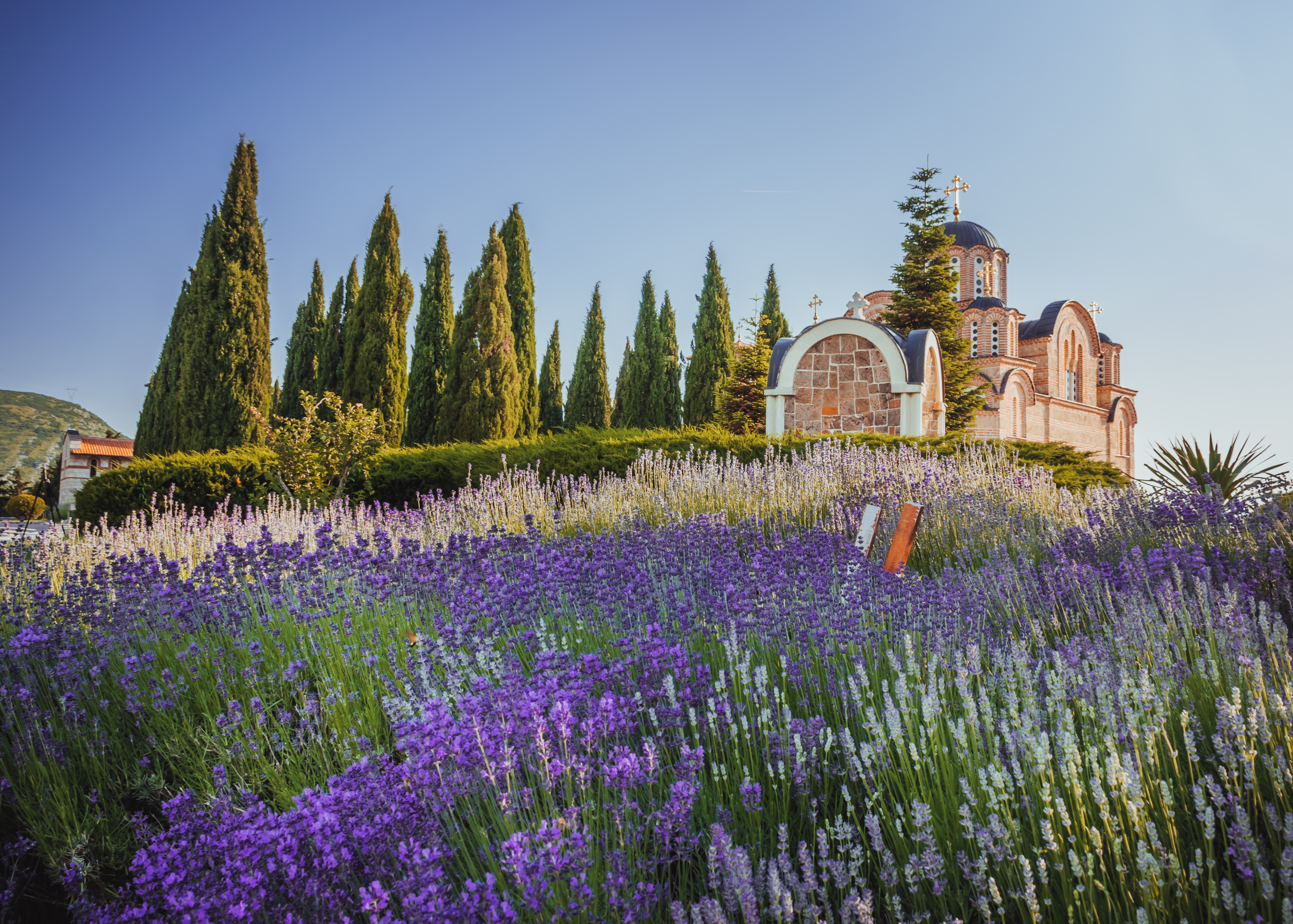
Hercegovačka Gračanica, a Serbian Orthodox monastery located on the Crkvina Hill overlooking the town.

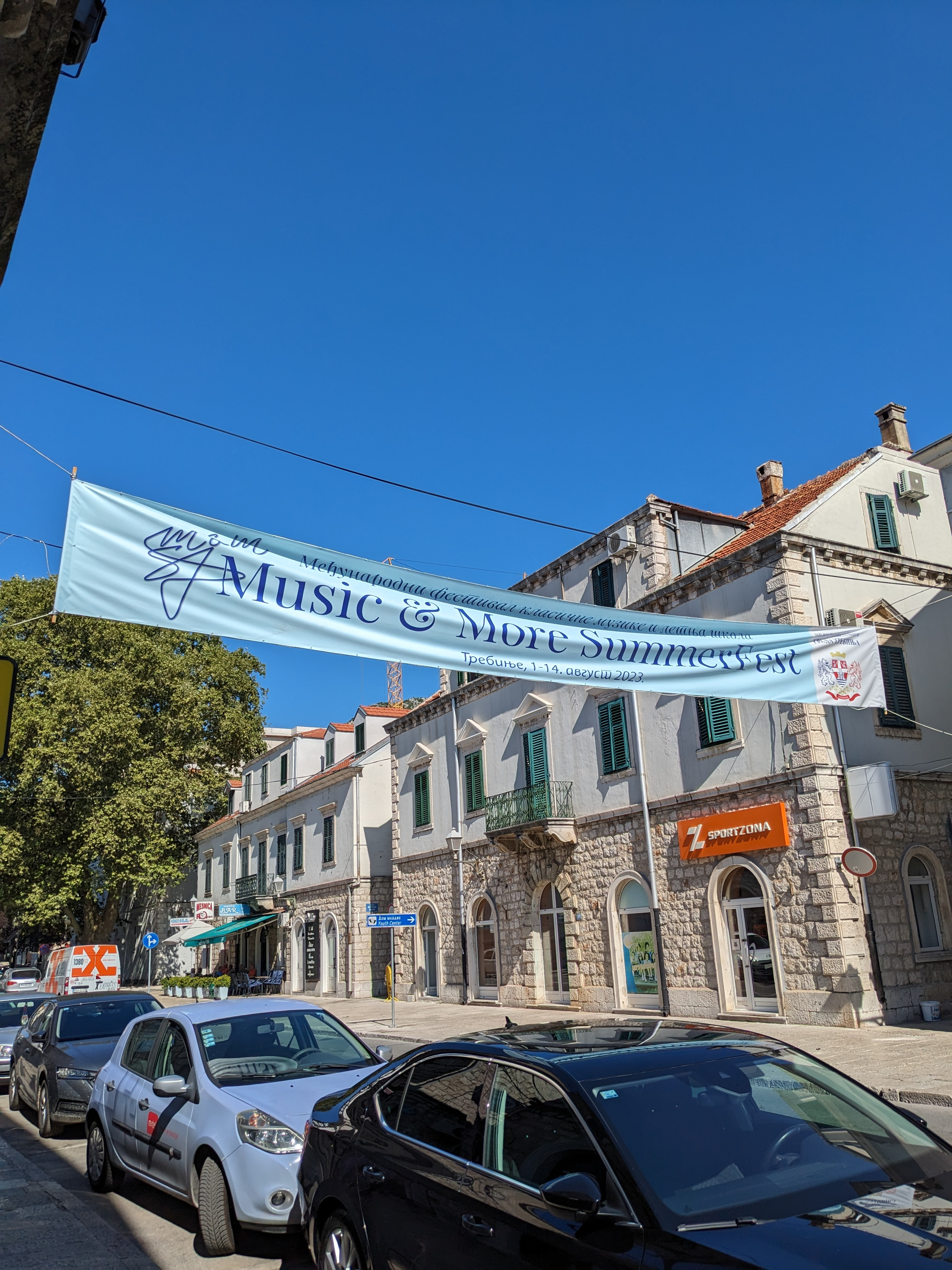
A banner emblazoned with ‘Music and More Summer Festival 2023’ adorns the road “Kralja Petra I Oslobodioca” in Trebinje

The Serbian Orthodox church in Trebinje, Saborna Crkva, was built between 1888 and 1908. The Hercegovačka Gračanica monastery, a loose copy of the Gračanica monastery in Kosovo, was completed in 2000. The churches are located above the city, on the historic Crkvina Hill. The 15th-century Tvrdoš monastery is located two kilometres south-west of Trebinje, including a church which dates back to late antiquity. The Duži Monastery is located 10 kilometres west of Trebinje. There is also the Roman Catholic Cathedral of the Birth of Mary in the town centre. The Osman-Paša Resulbegović mosque, located in the Old Town, was originally built in 1726 and fully renovated in 2005.

Monuments dedicated to acclaimed poets Njegoš and Jovan Dučić (who was from the town) are located in the city centre.

The Old Town walls are well preserved. The Arslanagić Bridge (1574) is located 1 km north of the town center.

The Music & More SummerFest has recently become an annual tradition in Trebinje, spanning approximately two weeks in August. The festival is held at a variety of venues, including the Amphitheater Crkvina, KCT culture center Trebinje, local music school, Villa Lastva, and the Museum of Herzegovina.

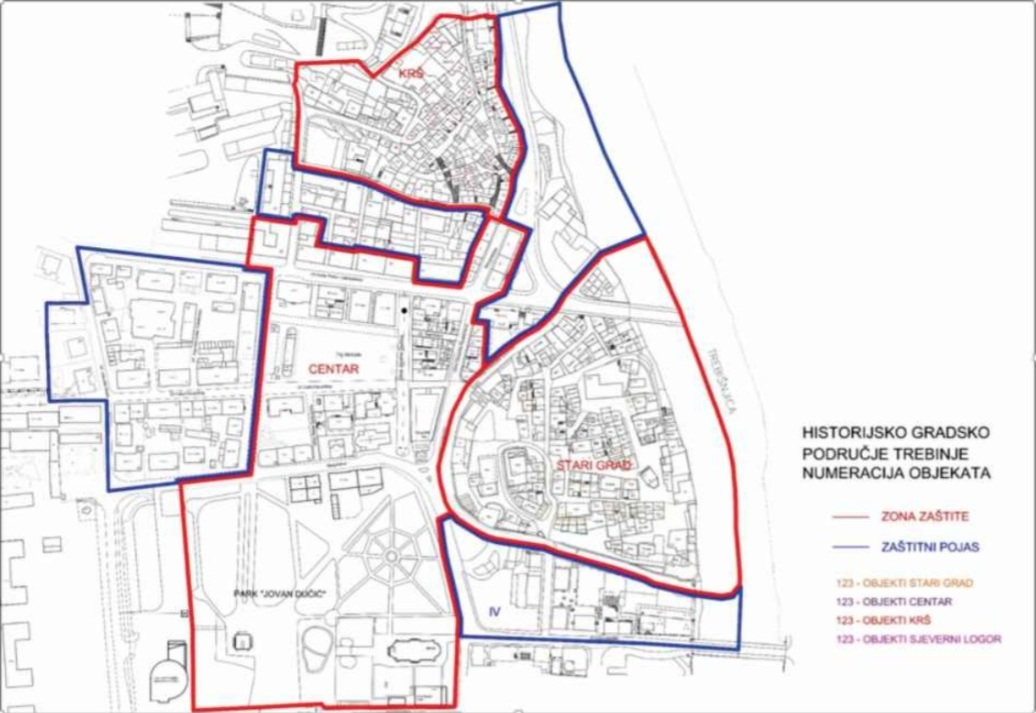
Zones of protection - Trebinje walled town and the rest of the protected historic urban zone by KONS

== Heritage designation ==
Historic urban center of Trebinje, including zones of Walled town of Trebinje, also known as Stari Grad (Old Town), Krš, Centar, and Sjeverni Logor, are declared a National Monument of Bosnia and Herzegovina by KONS.

== Sports ==
The local football club, FK Leotar Trebinje, plays in the First League of the Republika Srpska, the second-tier competition in Bosnia and Herzegovina.

== Economy ==
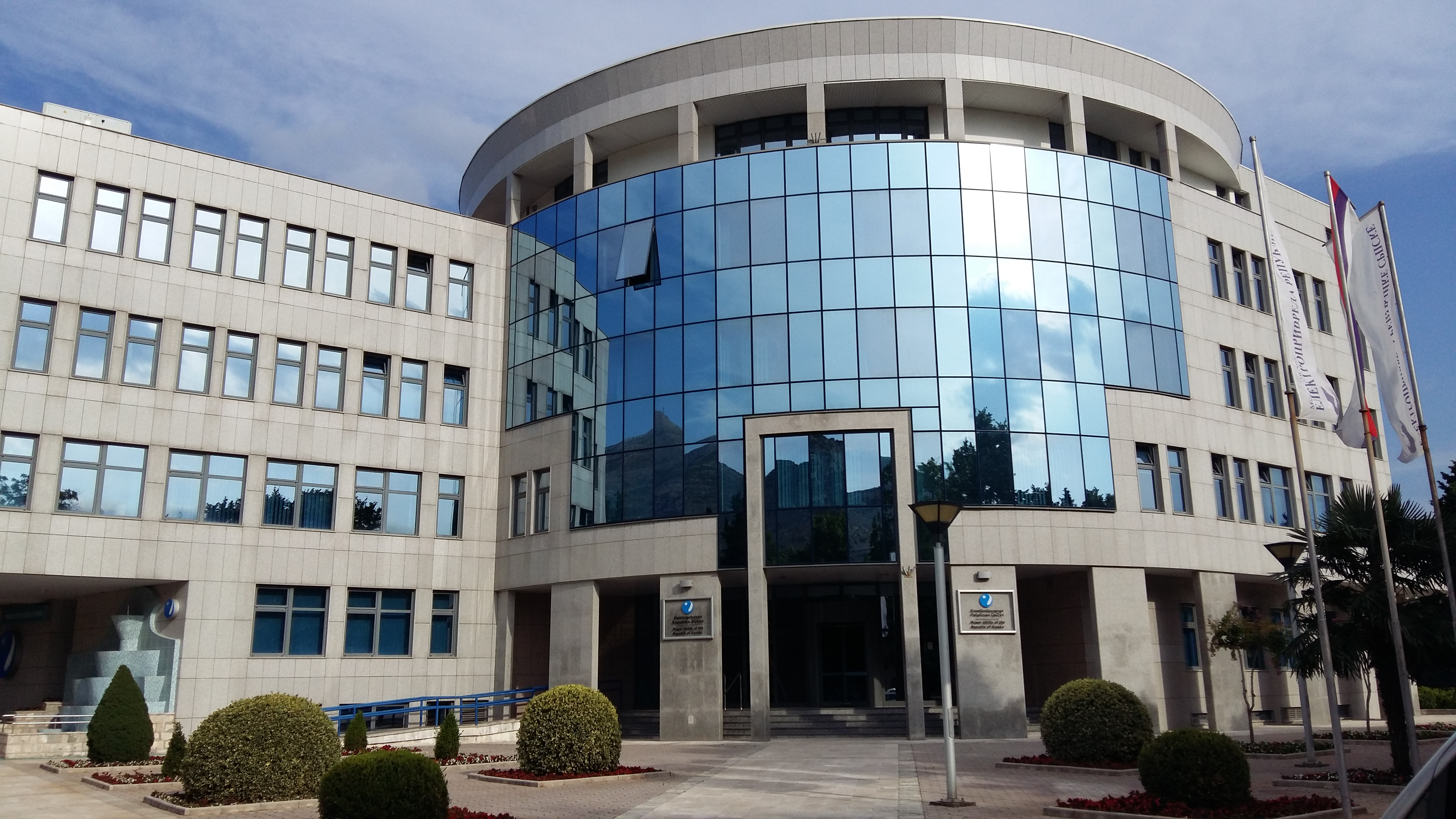
Elektroprivreda Republike Srpske headquarters

The headquarters of Elektroprivreda Republike Srpske, which is the largest employer in Republika Srpska (as of 2016), is located in Trebinje. As of 2016, most of its economy is based on services.

The following table gives a preview of total number of registered people employed in legal entities per their core activity (as of 2018):

Activity	Total
Agriculture, forestry and fishing	152
Mining and quarrying	9
Manufacturing	1,440
Electricity, gas, steam and air conditioning supply	1,286
Water supply; sewerage, waste management and remediation activities	214
Construction	362
Wholesale and retail trade, repair of motor vehicles and motorcycles	1,157
Transportation and storage	151
Accommodation and food services	521
Information and communication	134
Financial and insurance activities	128
Real estate activities	1
Professional, scientific and technical activities	174
Administrative and support service activities	136
Public administration and defense; compulsory social security	972
Education	635
Human health and social work activities	601
Arts, entertainment and recreation	124
Other service activities	157
Total	8,354

== International relations ==
Twin towns – sister cities

Trebinje is twinned with:

- (Serbia) Vršac
- (Serbia) Gornji Milanovac
- (Serbia) Lučani
- (Serbia) Zrenjanin
- (Serbia) Čačak
- (Serbia) Medijana
- (Montenegro) Herceg Novi
- (Montenegro) Nikšić
- (United States) Jackson
- (Russia) Orekhovo-Zuyevo
- Štrpce

== Notable people ==
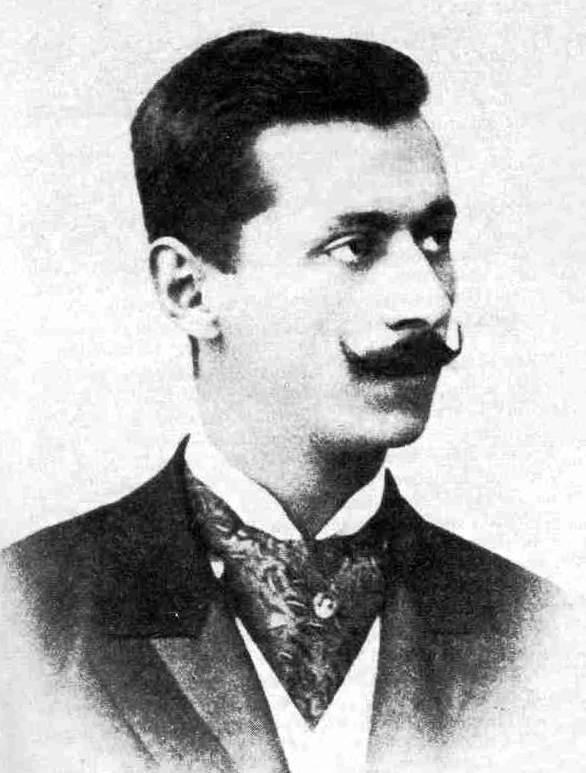
Jovan Dučić

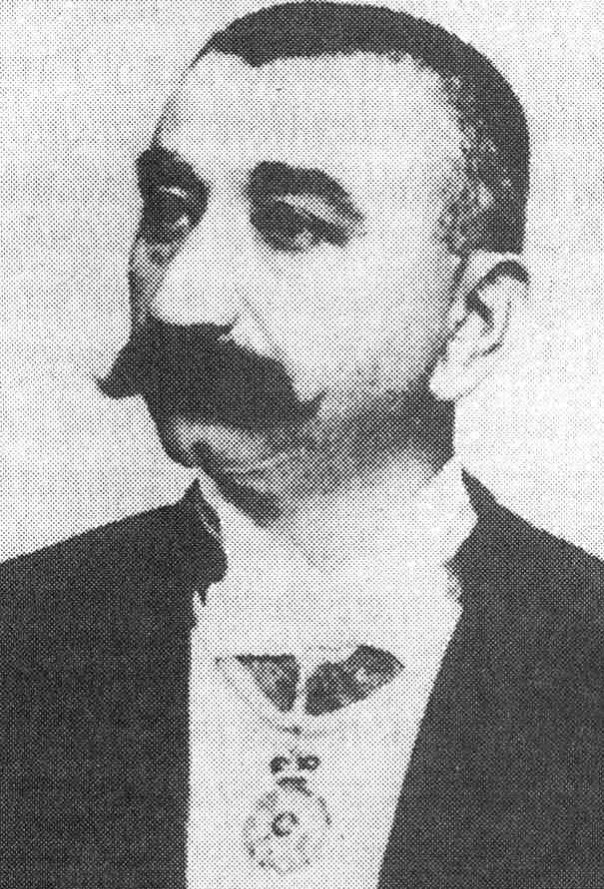
Luka Ćelović

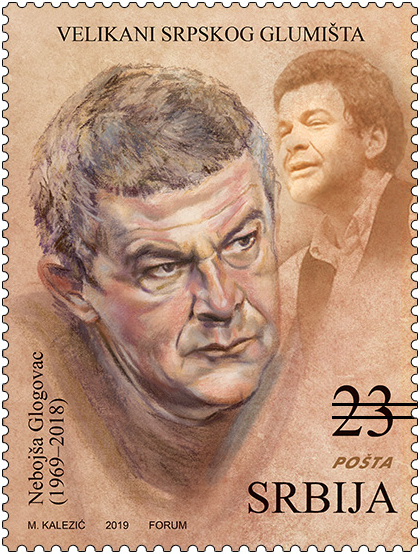
Nebojša Glogovac

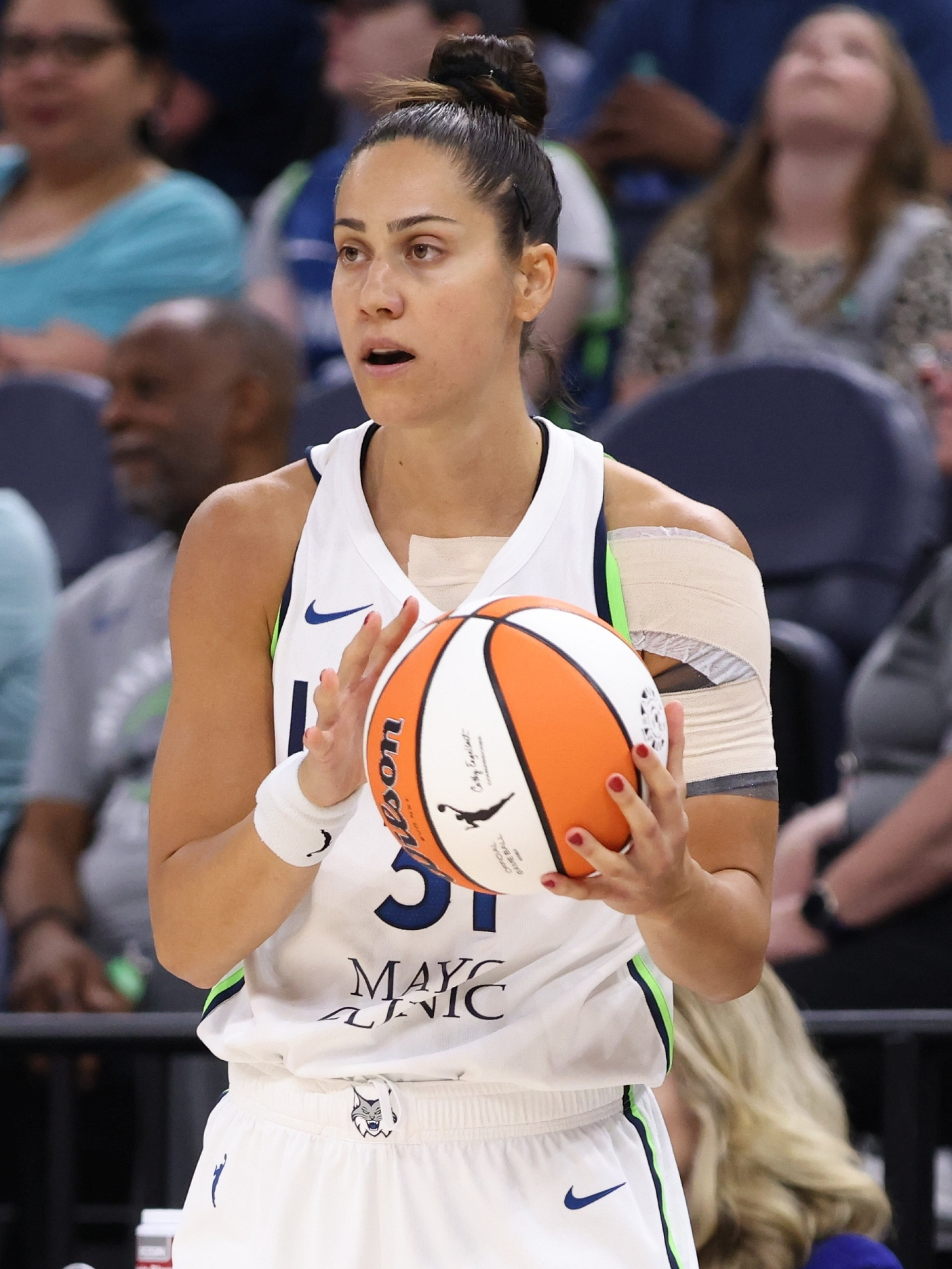
Nikolina Milić

- Basil of Ostrog, bishop and saint
- Mićo Ljubibratić, voivode
- Jovan Dučić, poet and diplomat
- Luka Ćelović, businessman and philanthropist
- Jovan Deretić, historian
- Nebojša Glogovac, actor
- Nataša Ninković, actress
- Atanasije Popović, painter
- Rista Vukanović, painter
- Srđan Aleksić, soldier
- Beba Selimović, sevdalinka singer
- Dzeny, singer and philanthropist
- Asmir Begović, football goalkeeper
- Boris Savović, basketball player
- Branislav Krunić, footballer
- Milena Nikolić, footballer
- Ivana Ninković, Olympic swimmer
- Uroš Đerić, footballer
- Semjon Milošević, footballer
- Igor Joksimović, footballer
- Nikolina Milić, WNBA player
- Siniša Mulina, footballer
- Vladimir Gudelj, footballer
- Arnela Odžaković, karateka
- Sanja Starović, volleyball player
- Igor Butulija, handball player
- Vladimir Radmanović, NBA player, World champion
- Sabahudin Bilalović, basketball player
- Bogić Vučković, rebel leader
- Mijat Gaćinović, football player, World U-20 and European U-19 champion
- Marko Mihojević, footballer
- Tijana Bošković, volleyball player, World and European champion
- Momčilo Mrkaić, footballer
- Ratomir Dugonjić, politician

== Gallery ==
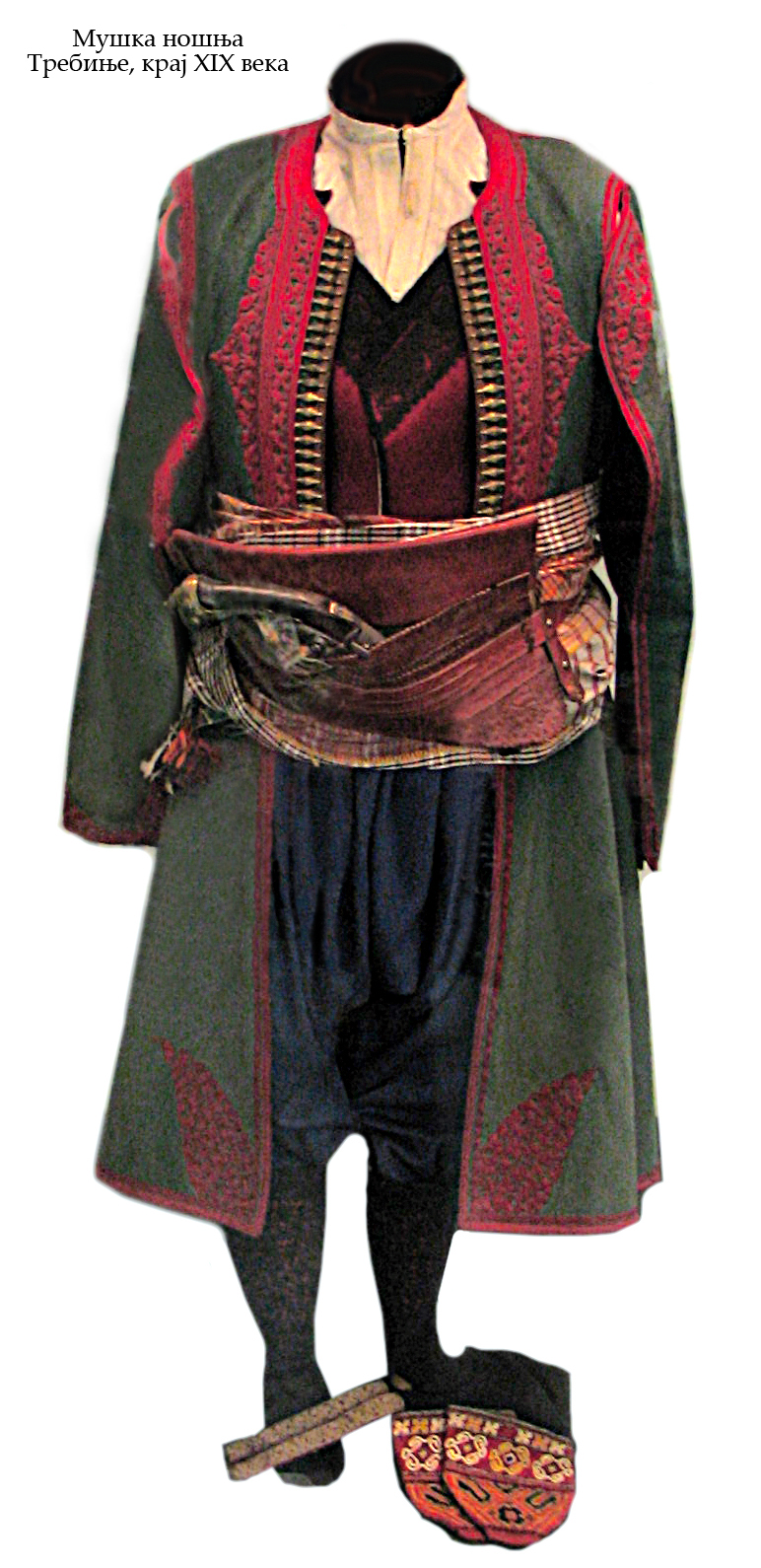
Serb national costume, 19th century

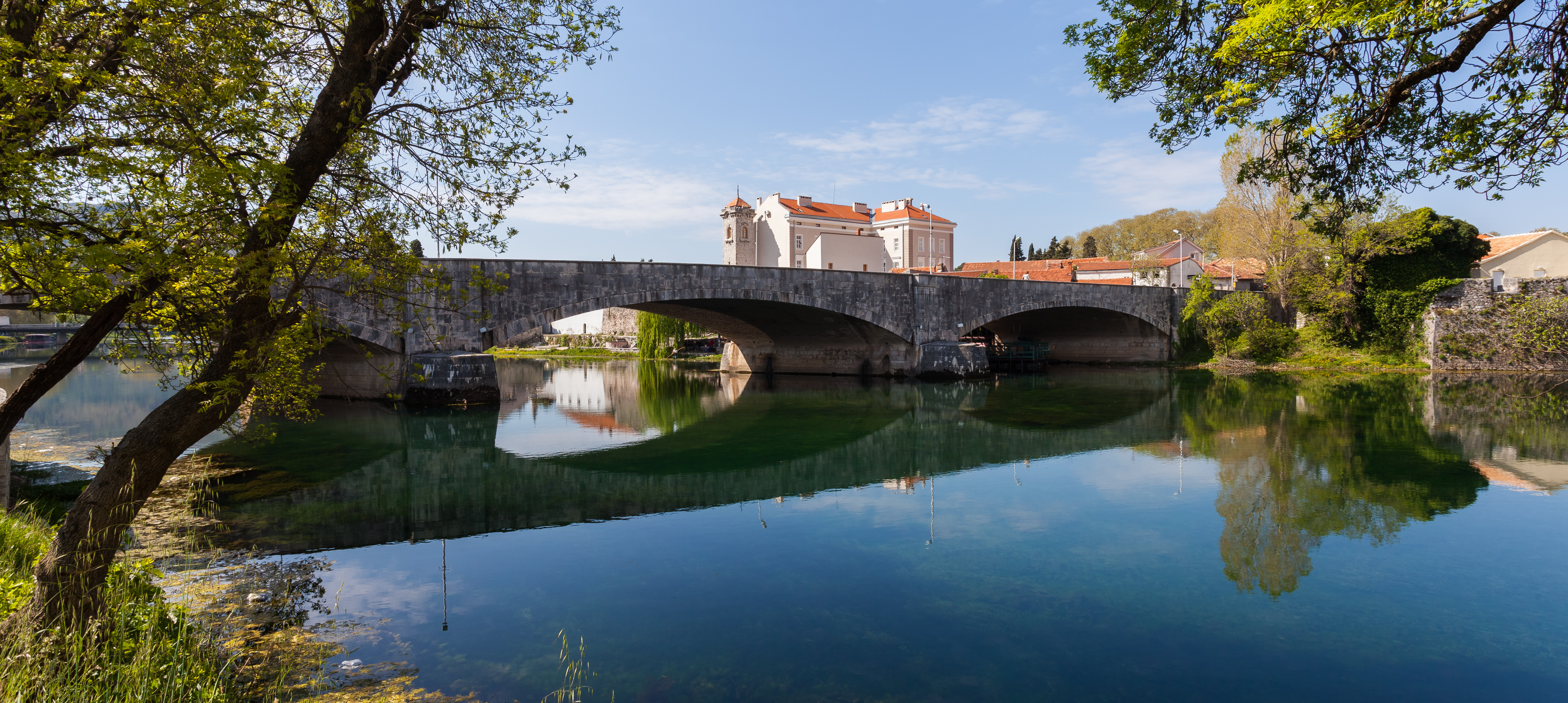
Trebišnjica river in Trebinje

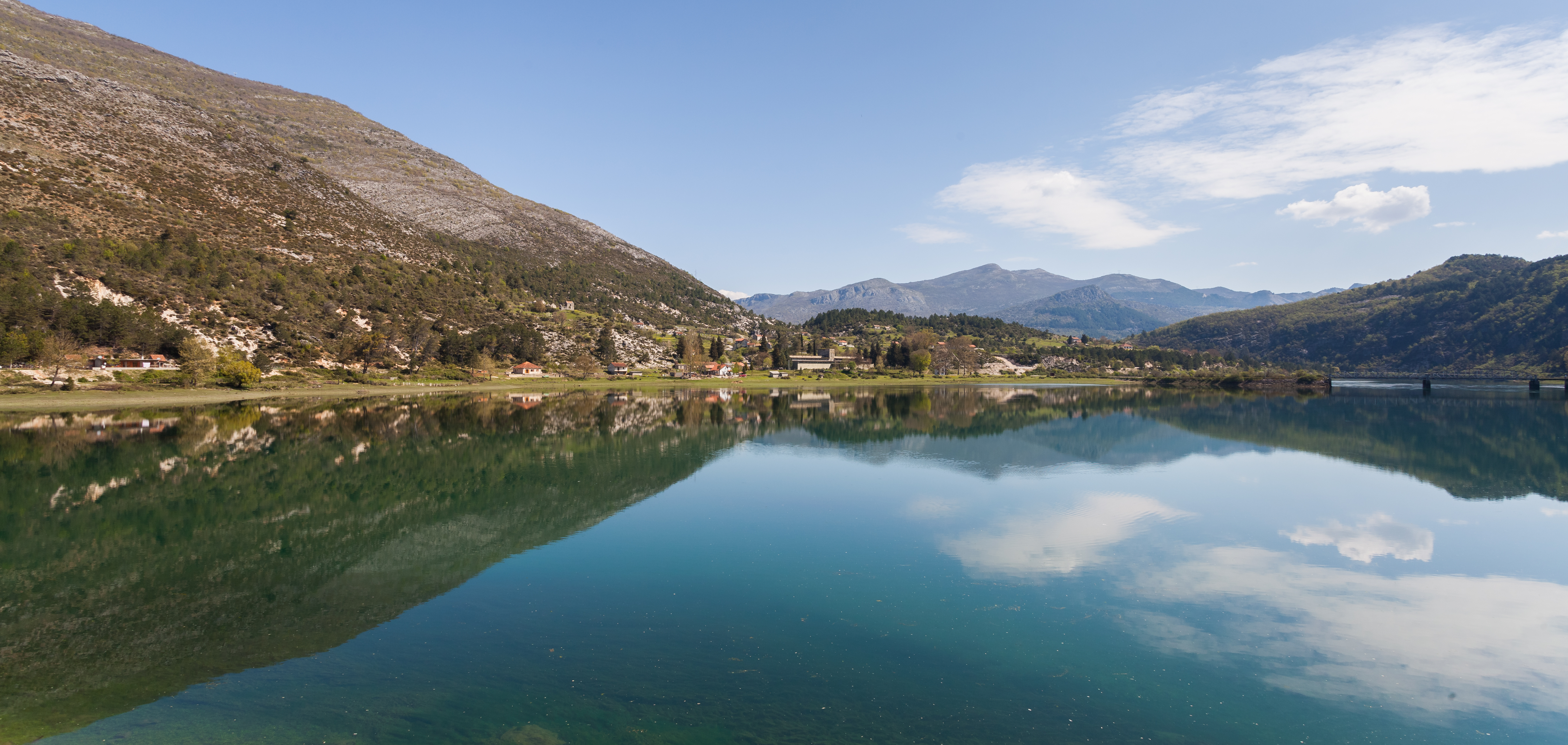
View of Orovac, village belonging to the municipality of Trebinje

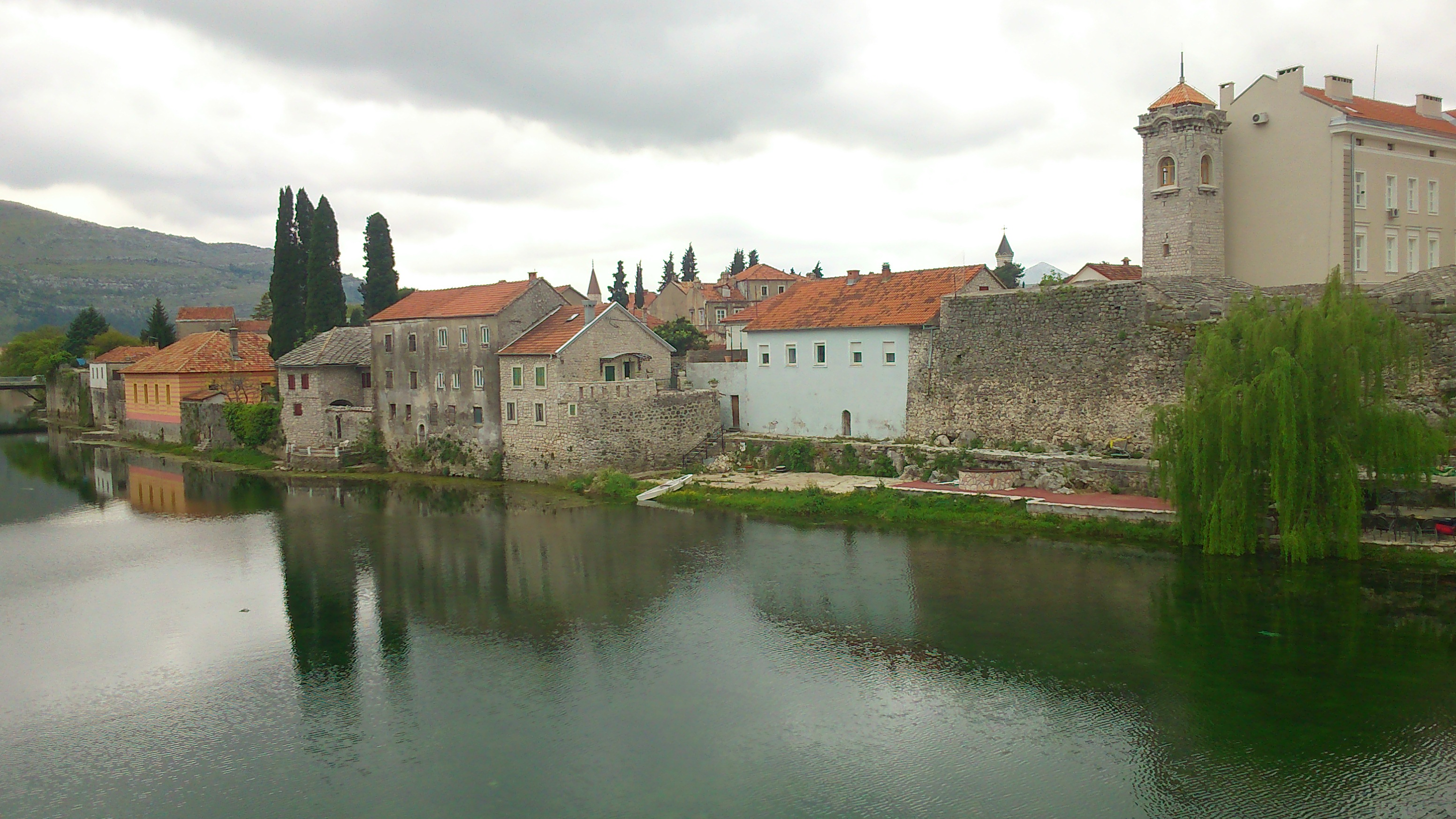
Old Town

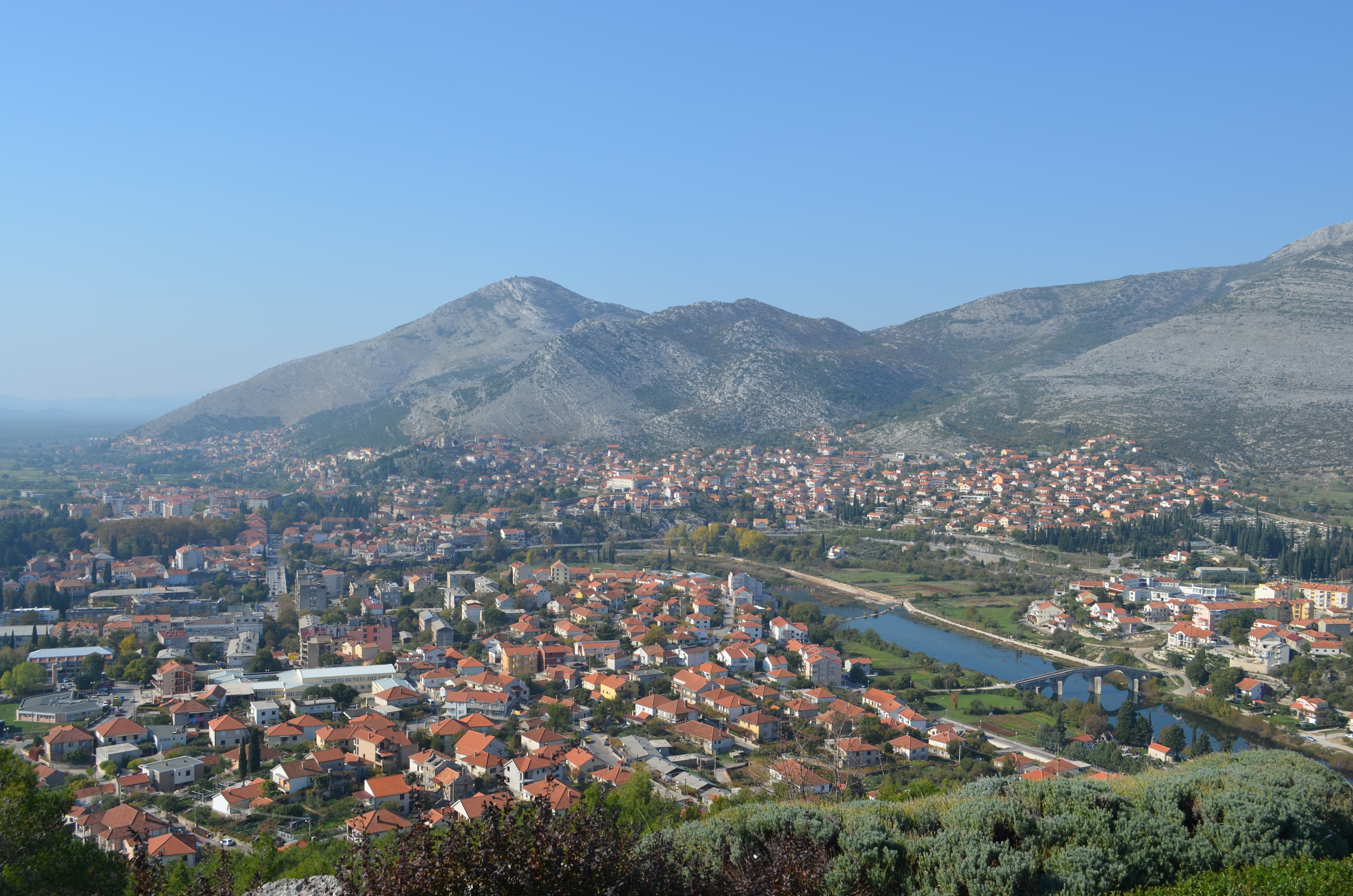
View from the hill

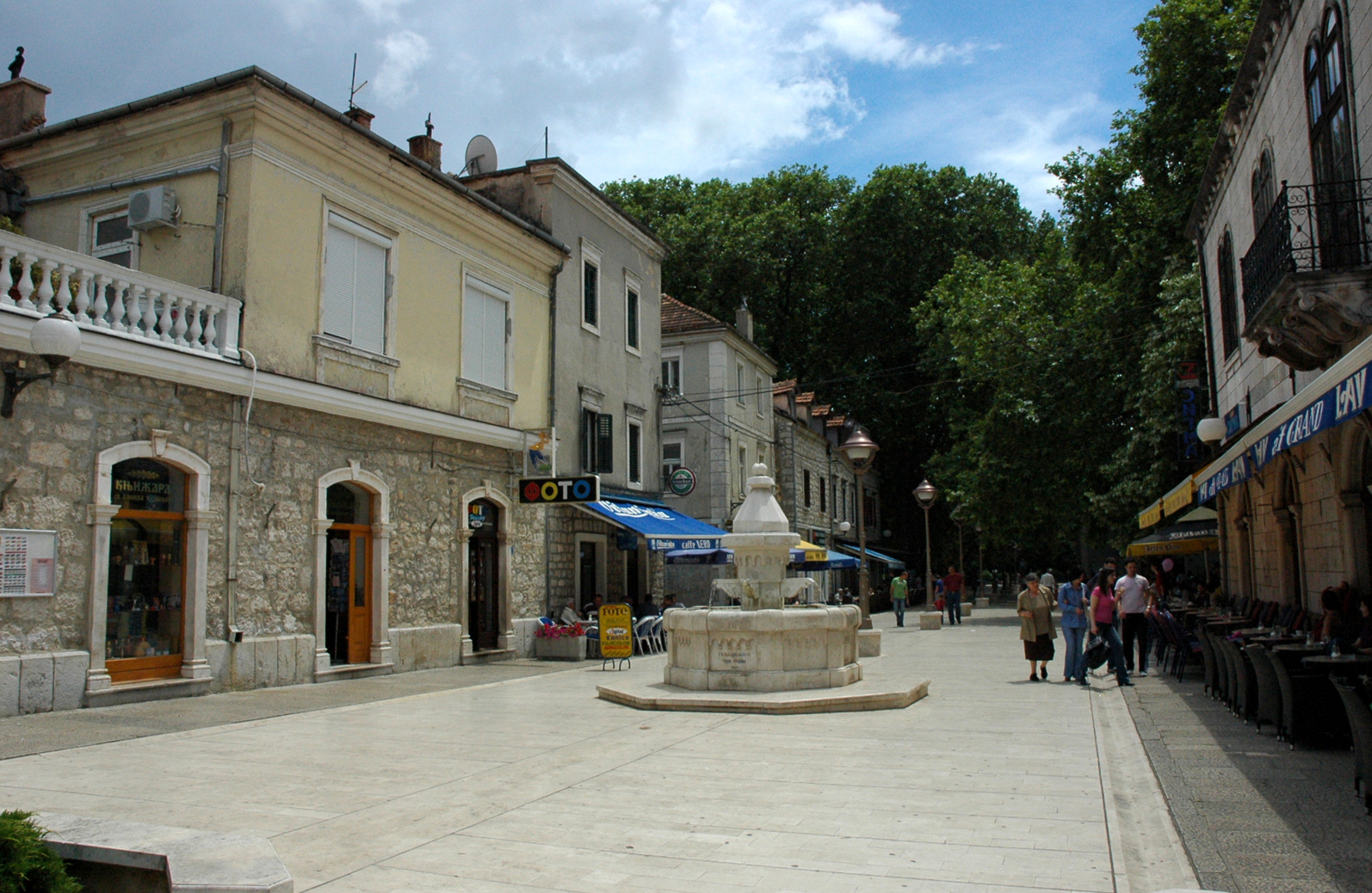
Old stone houses in Central street

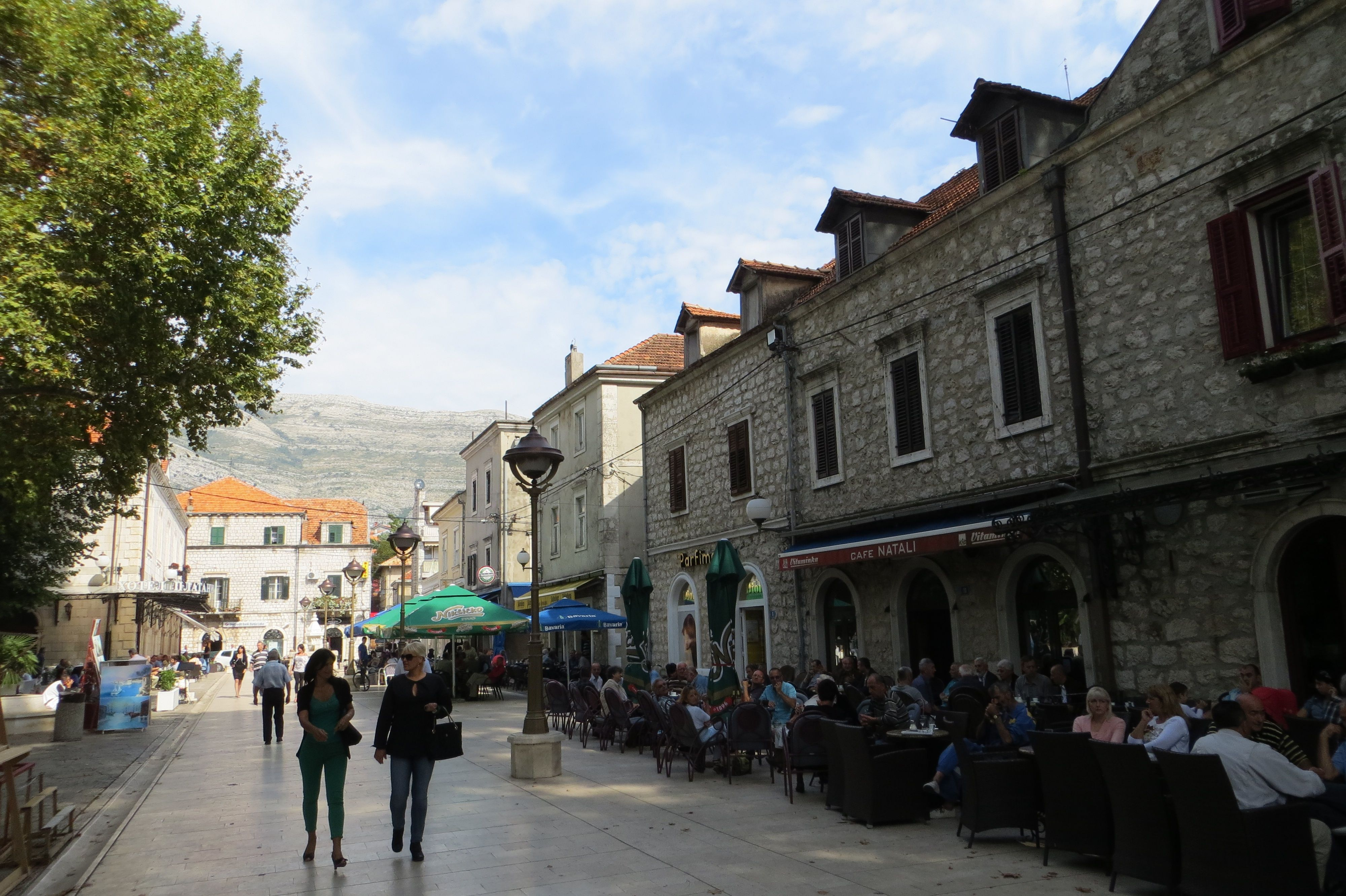
Jovan Dučić street

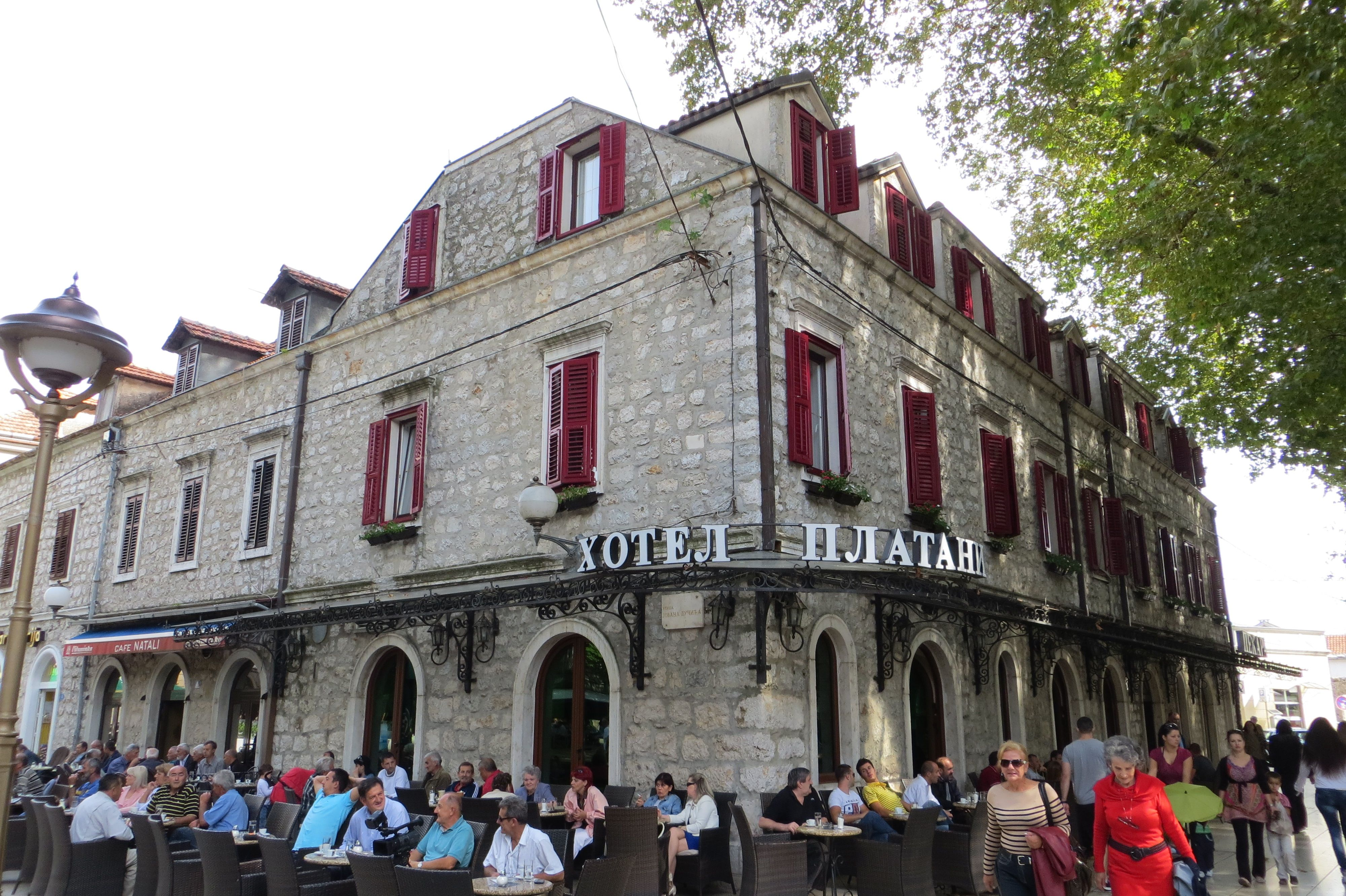
Hotel Platani

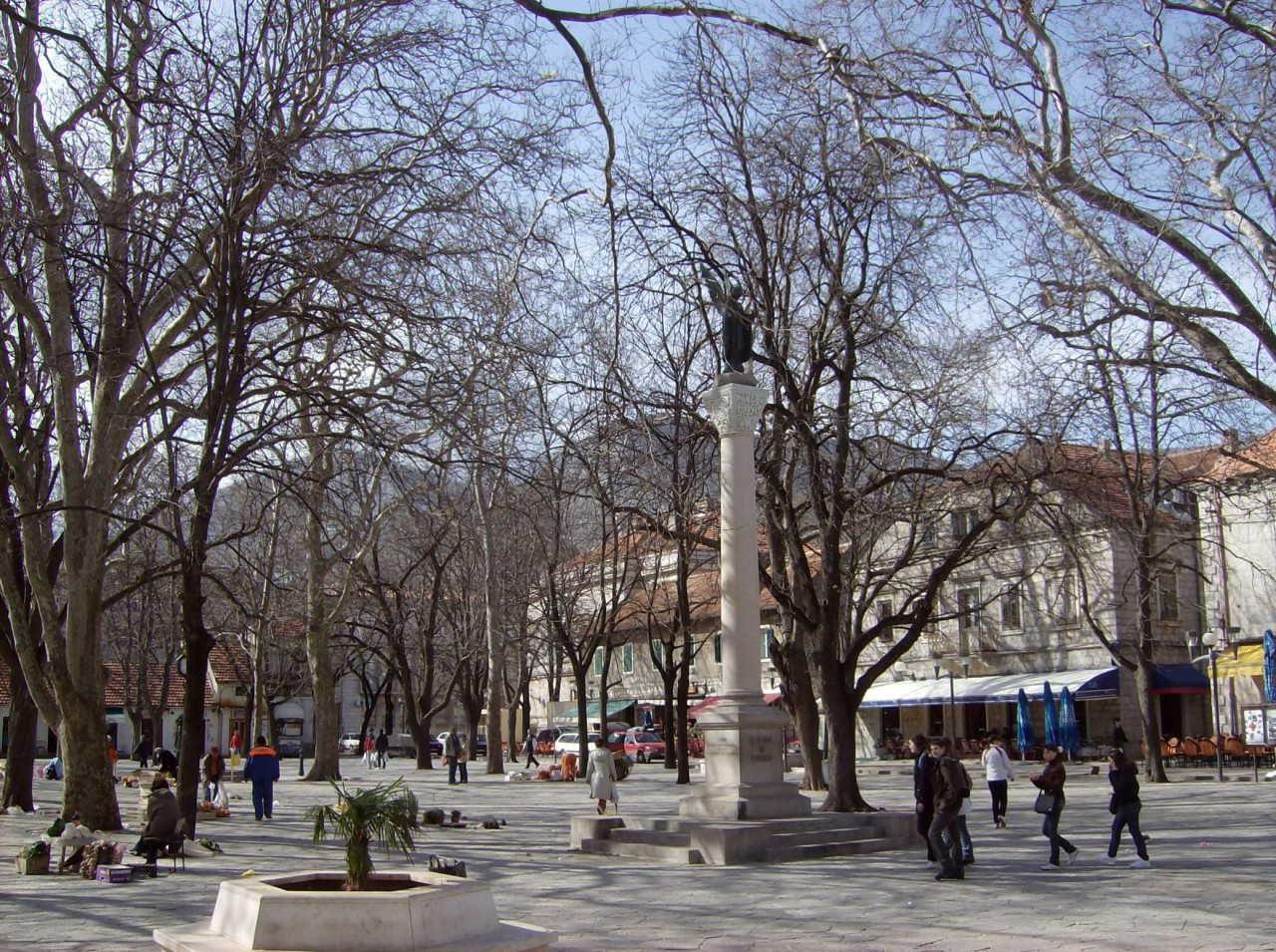
Monument to the Liberators and 120 years old platans

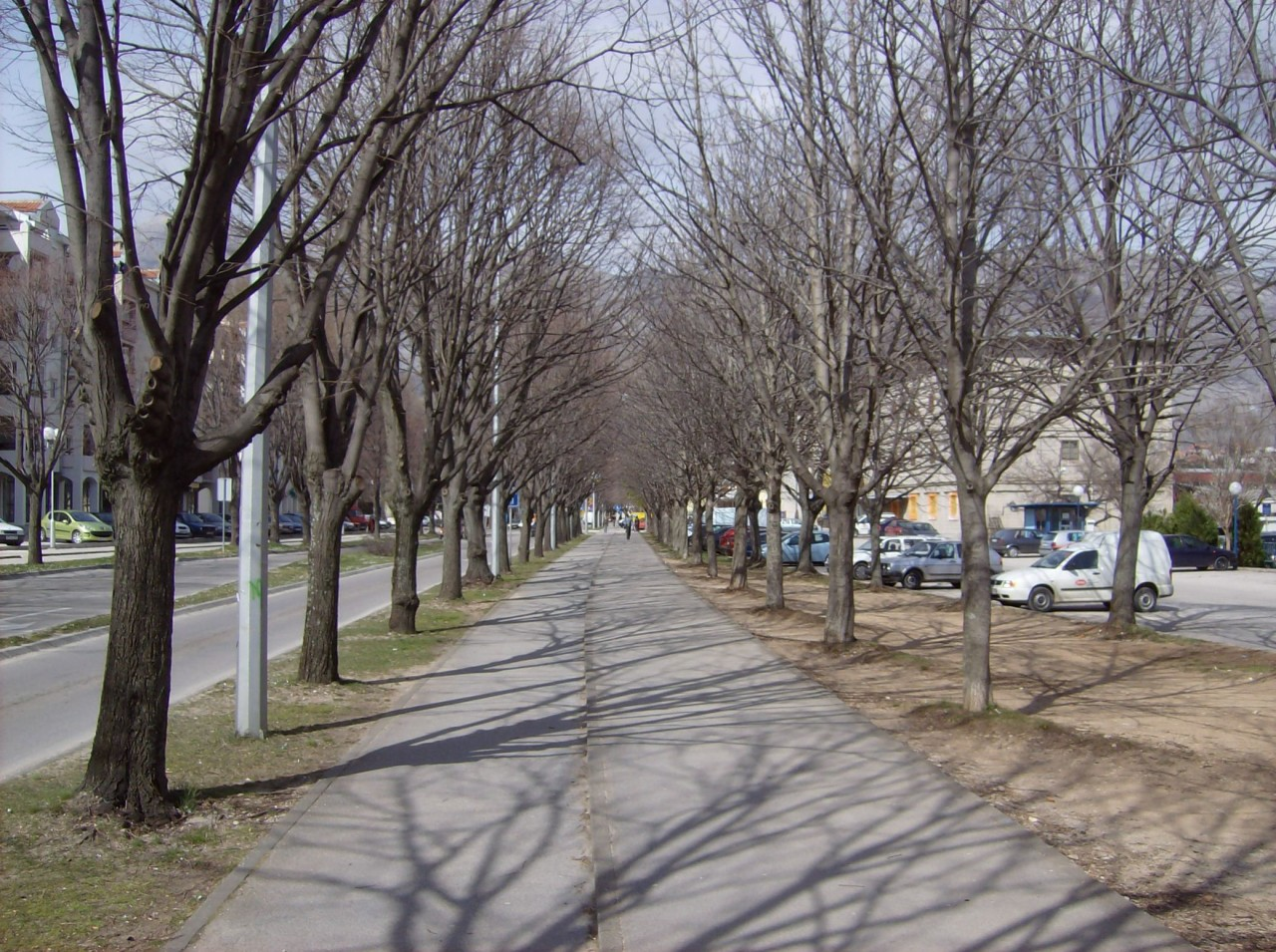
Pedestrian area

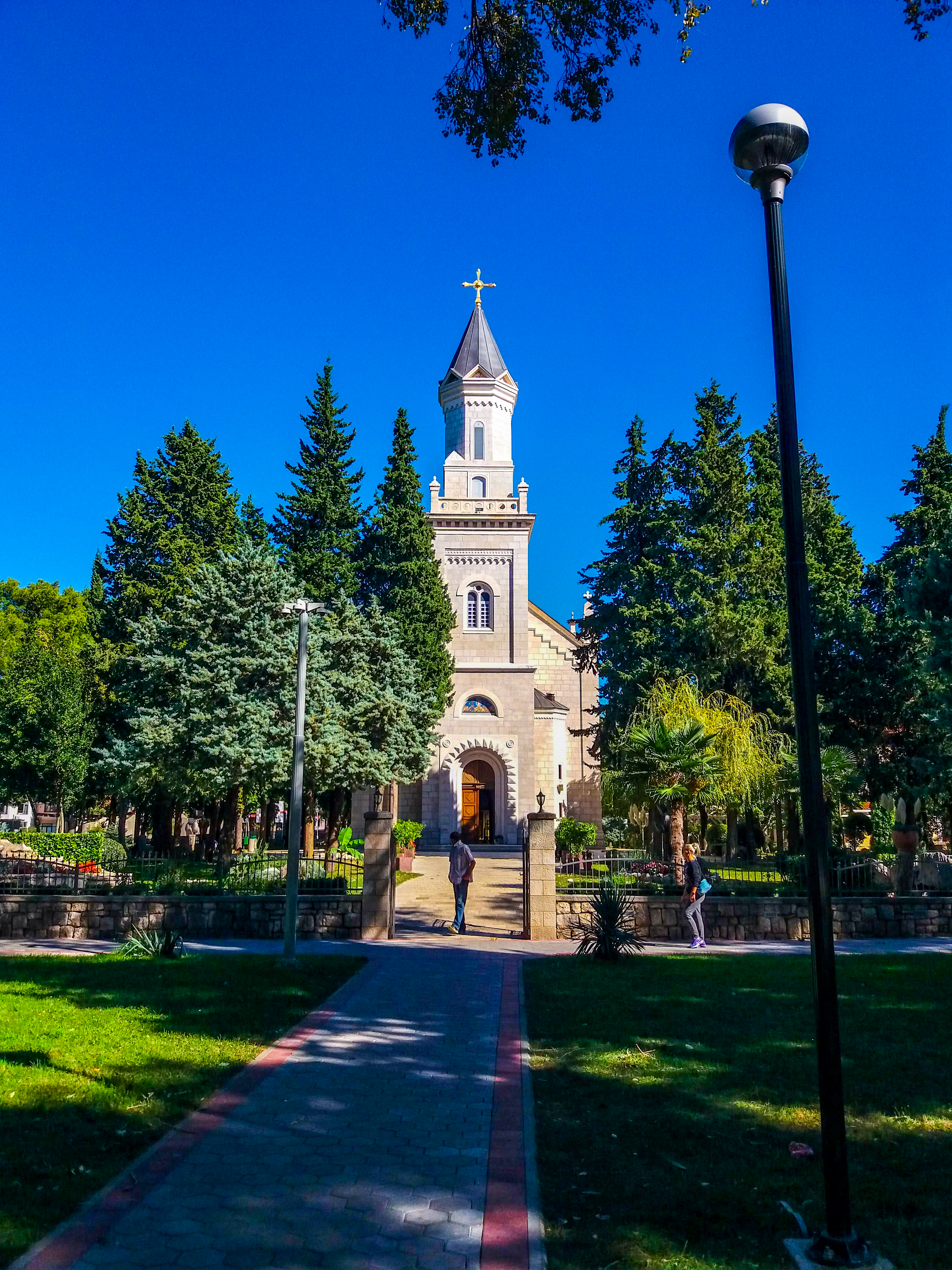
Church in Trebinje

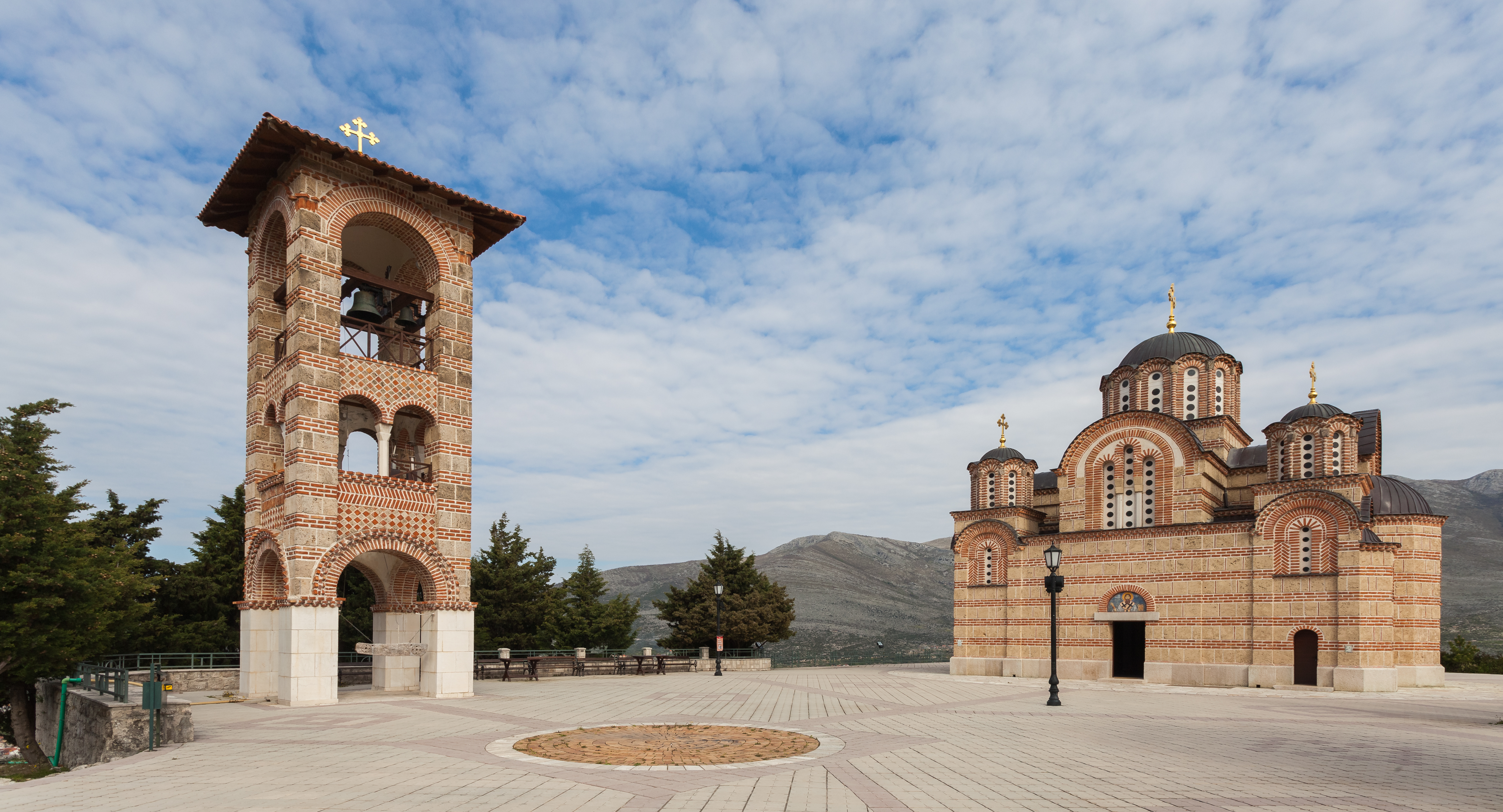
Nova Gračanica church

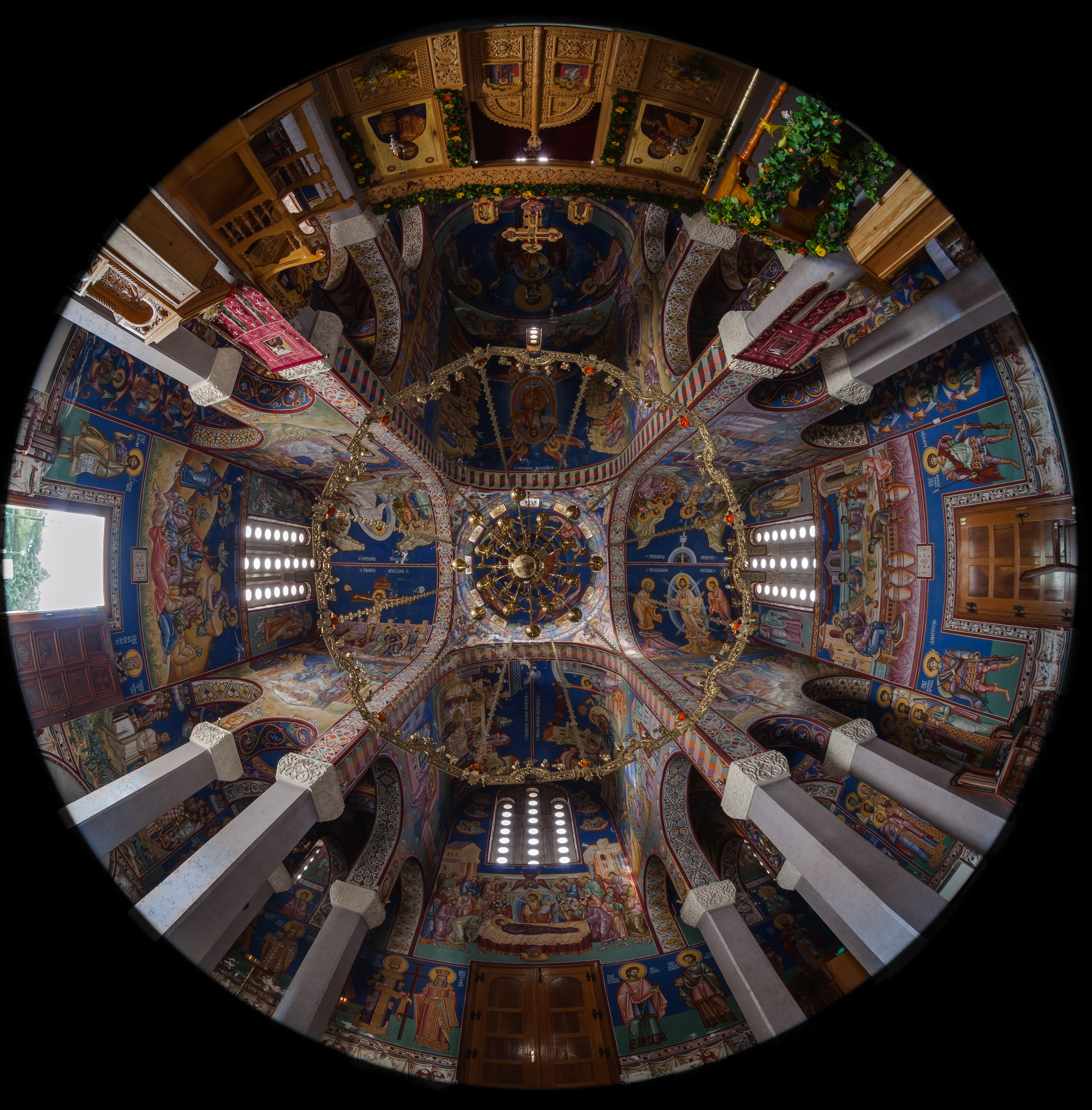
Spheric view of the interior of the Nova Gračanica church

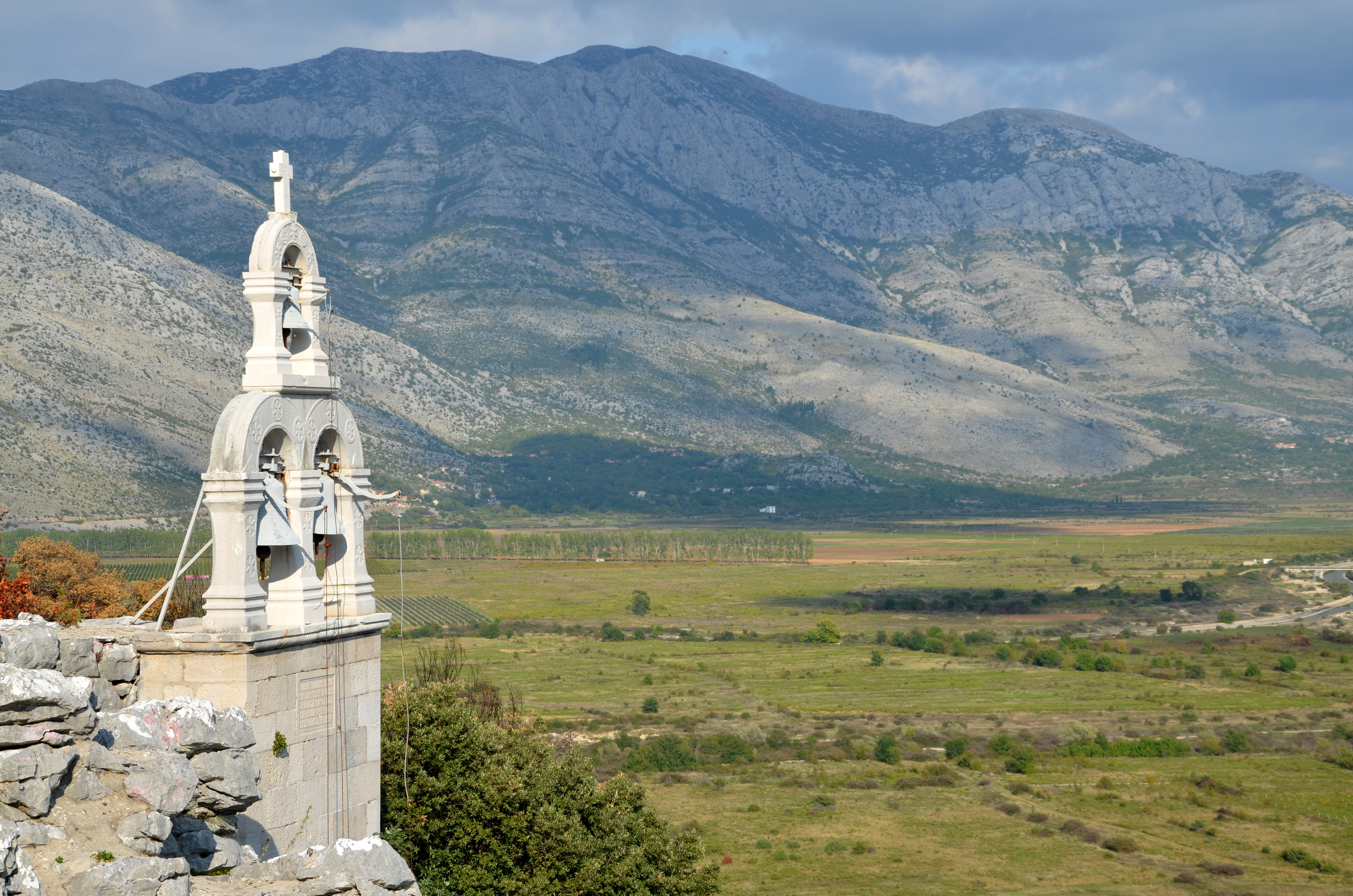
Zavala monastery (founded in the 16th century) and the surrounding landscape

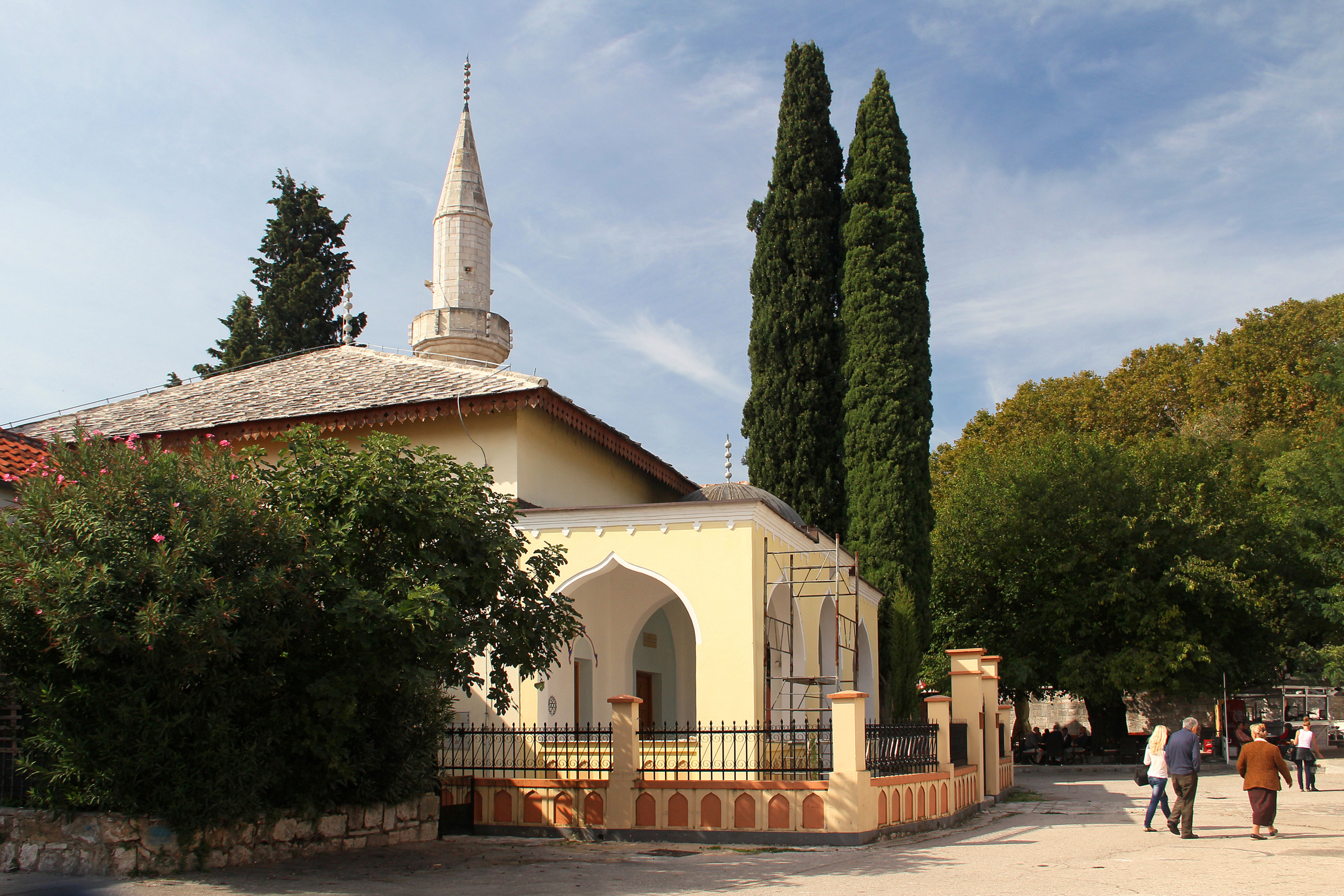
Osman-pasha's mosque

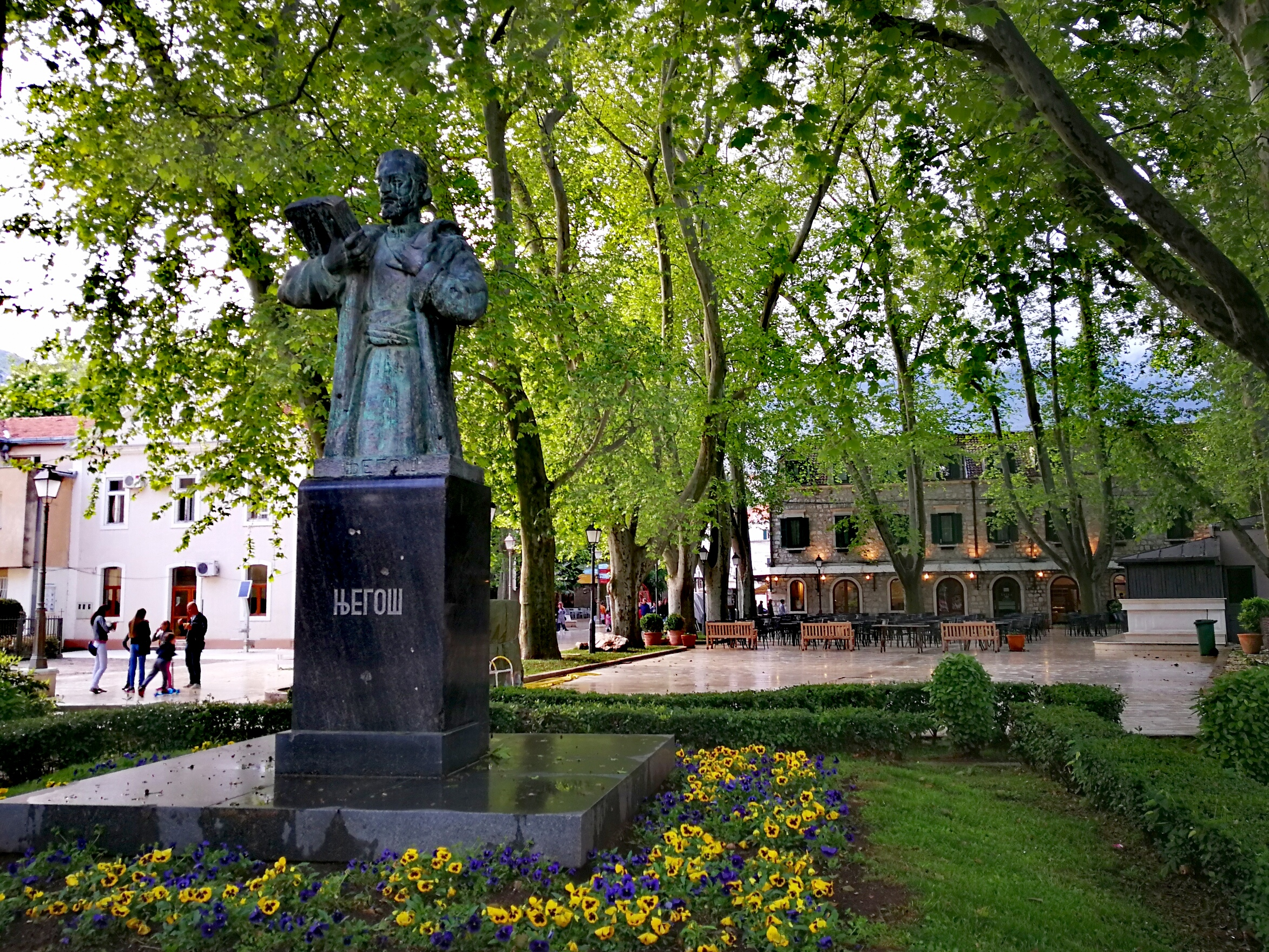
Monument dedicated to Petar II Petrović Njegoš

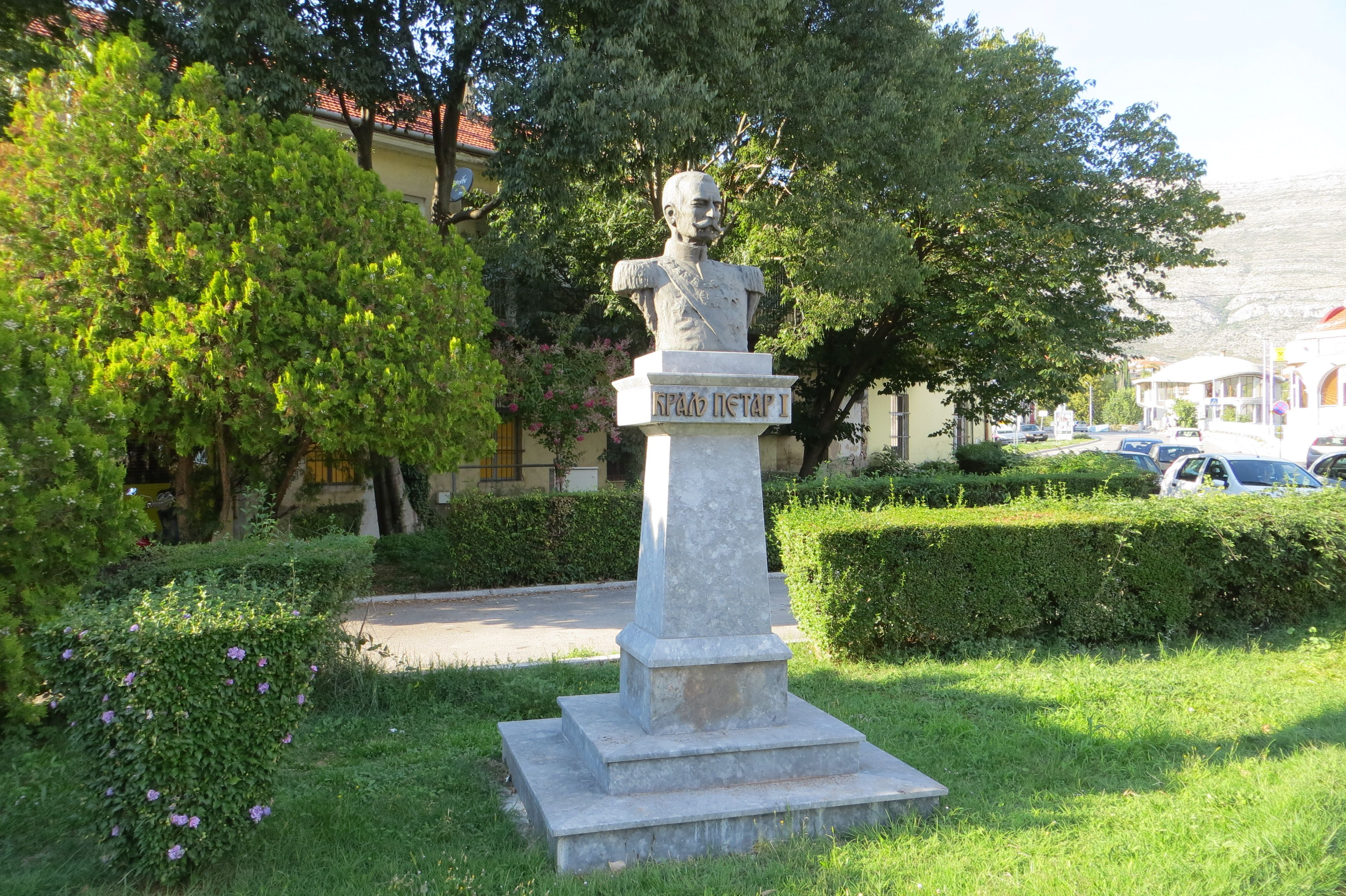
Bust of king Peter I of Serbia

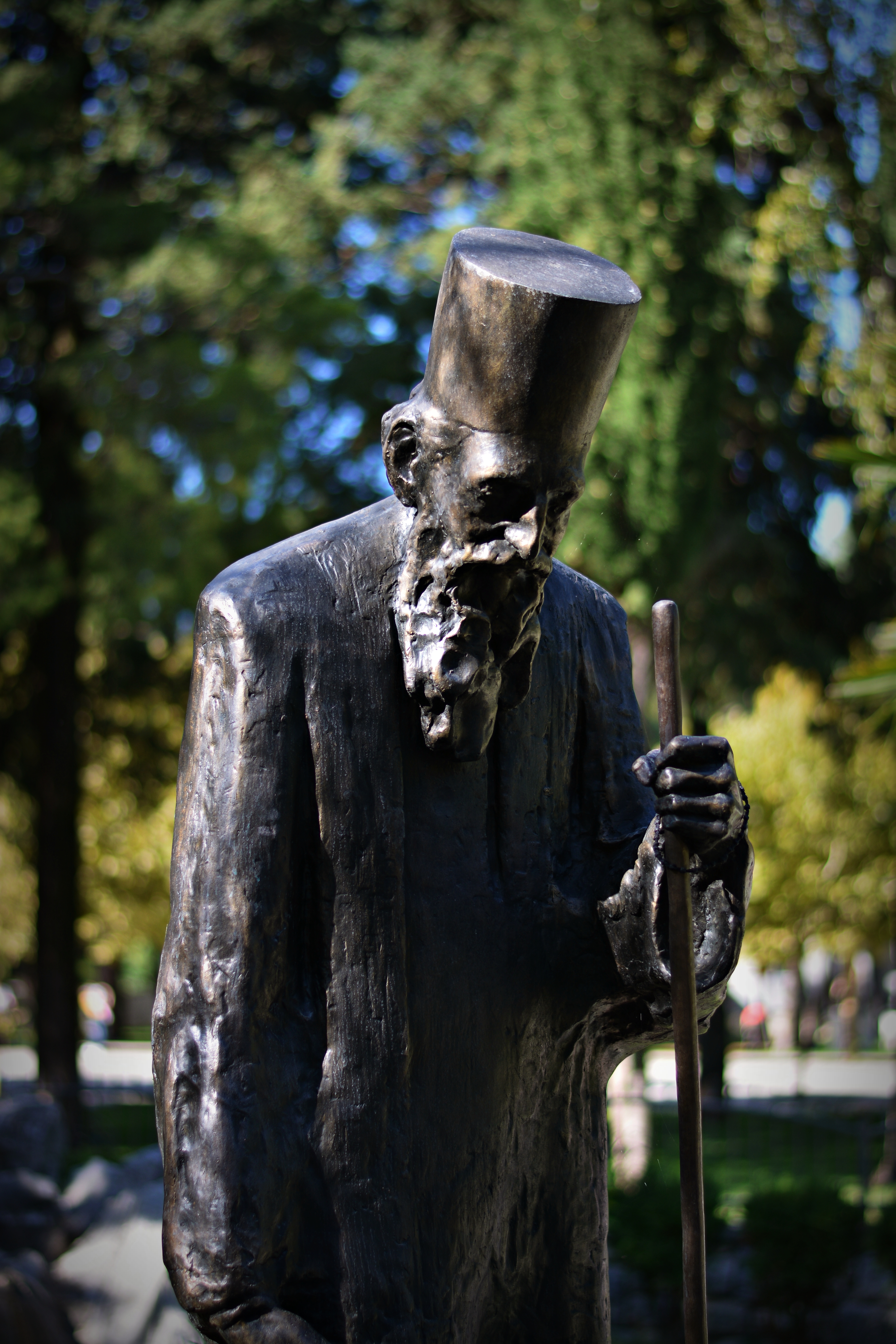
Monument dedicated to Pavle, Serbian Patriarch

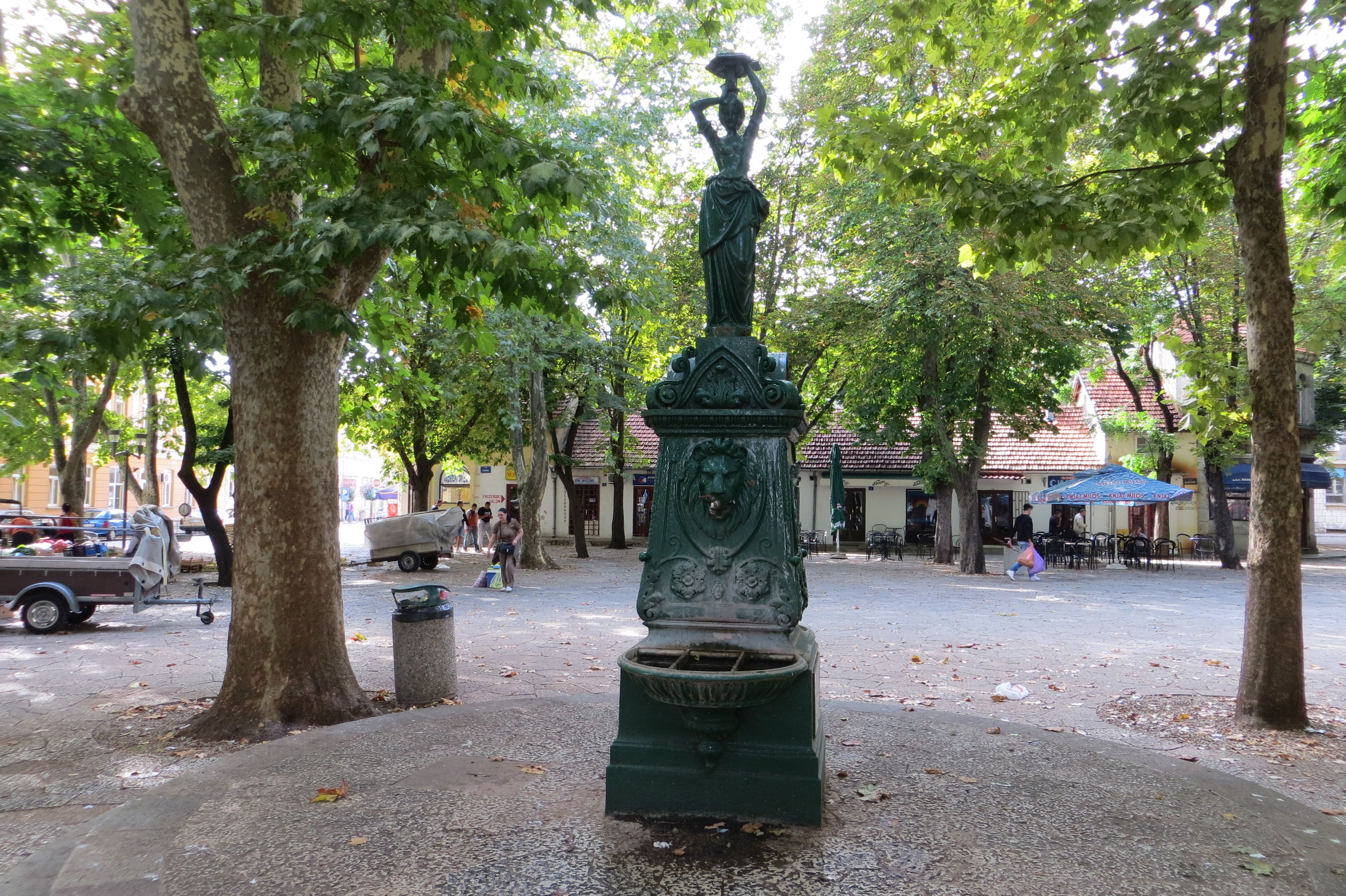
A fountain in the city

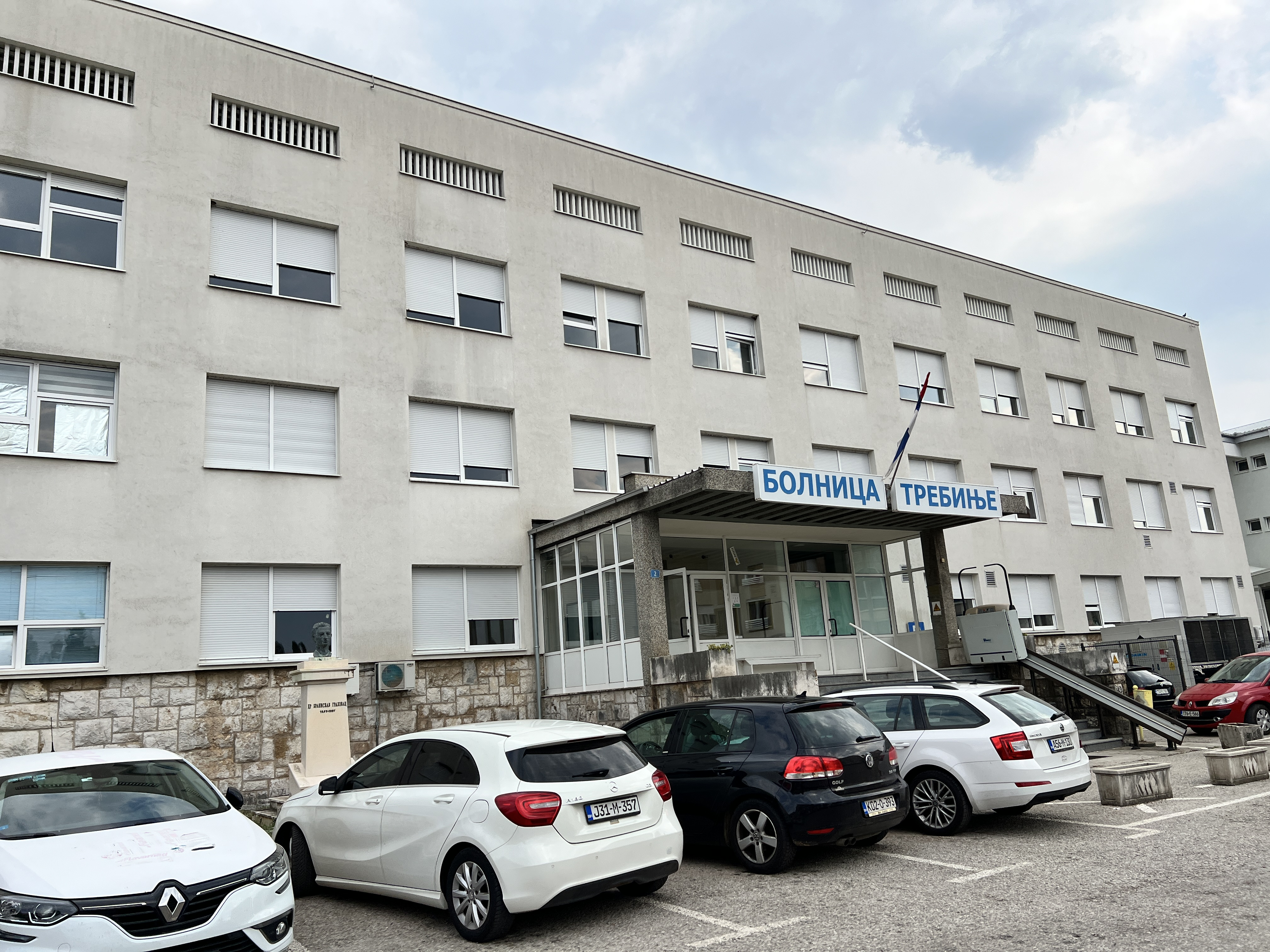
The hospital

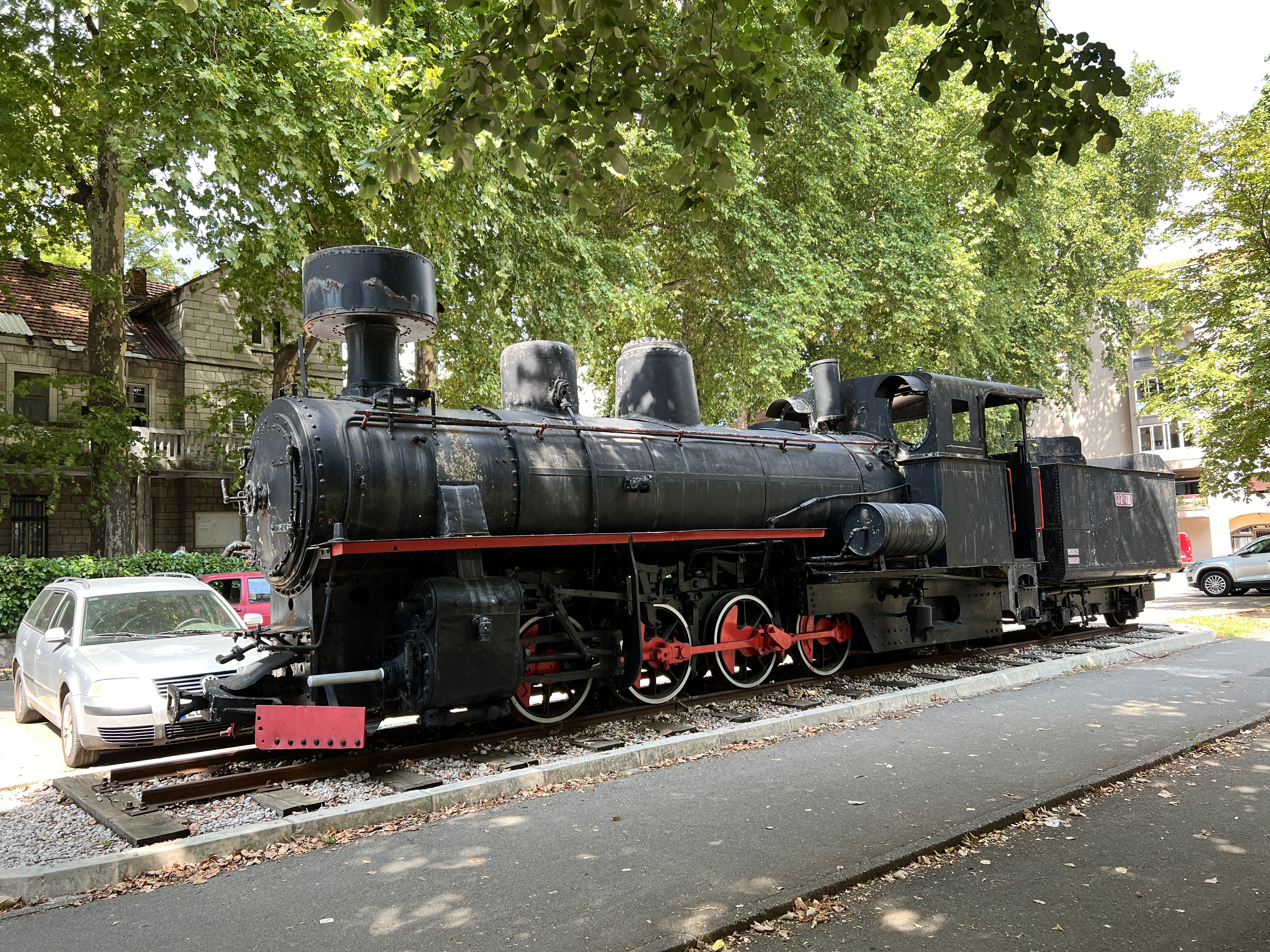
An old locomotive in front of the former train station

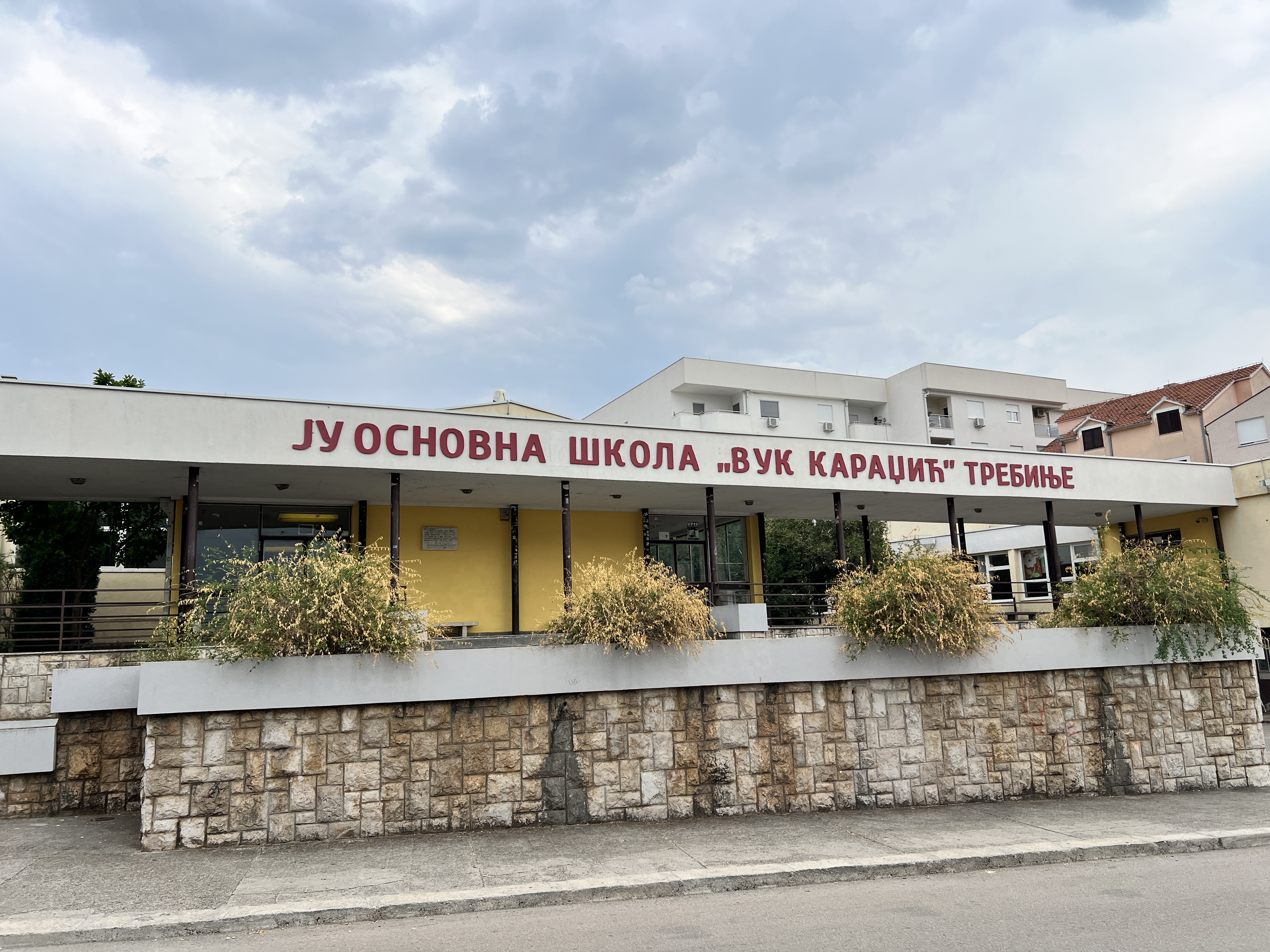
"Vuk Karadžić" Primary School

== Sources ==
- Cvijić, Siniša; Guzijan, Jasna (2016). "Urban regeneration as an instrument of identity preservation: A case study of Trebinje's Krš district" (html, pdf). Archives for Technical Sciences. 14 (1): 19–27. doi:10.7251/AFTS.2016.0814.019C.
- Toshikj, Marija; Zsembery, Ákos (2023). "Theoretical and practical issues regarding relocation of monuments – The case of Arslanagić Bridge in Trebinje" (PDF). Megaron. 18 (2): 127–141.
- "Historic urban center of Trebinje". Sarajevo: Commission to preserve national monuments KONS. 5 March 2003.
- Beldiceanu-Steinherr, Irène; Bojović, Boško I. (1993). "Le traité de paix conclu entre Vlatko et Mehmed II" (PDF). Balcanica. 24: 75–86. Archived from the original on 9 March 2022.
- Bataković, Dušan T. (1996). The Serbs of Bosnia & Herzegovina: History and Politics. Dialogue Association. ISBN 9782911527104.
- Bose, Sumantra (2002). Bosnia After Dayton: Nationalist Partition and International Intervention. Oxford: Oxford University Press. ISBN 978-0-19-515848-9.
- Ćirković, Sima (2004). The Serbs. Malden: Blackwell Publishing.
- Fine, John V. A. Jr. (1991) [1983]. The Early Medieval Balkans: A Critical Survey from the Sixth to the Late Twelfth Century. Ann Arbor: University of Michigan Press. ISBN 0-472-08149-7.
- Human Rights Watch (1993). War Crimes in Bosnia-Hercegovina, Volume 2. New York: Human Rights Watch. ISBN 978-1-56432-097-1.
- Mihić, Ljubo (1975). Ljubinje sa okolinom. Dragan Srnic.
