= Zalomka =

Zalomka Zalomska River, Đerope, Kolješka River
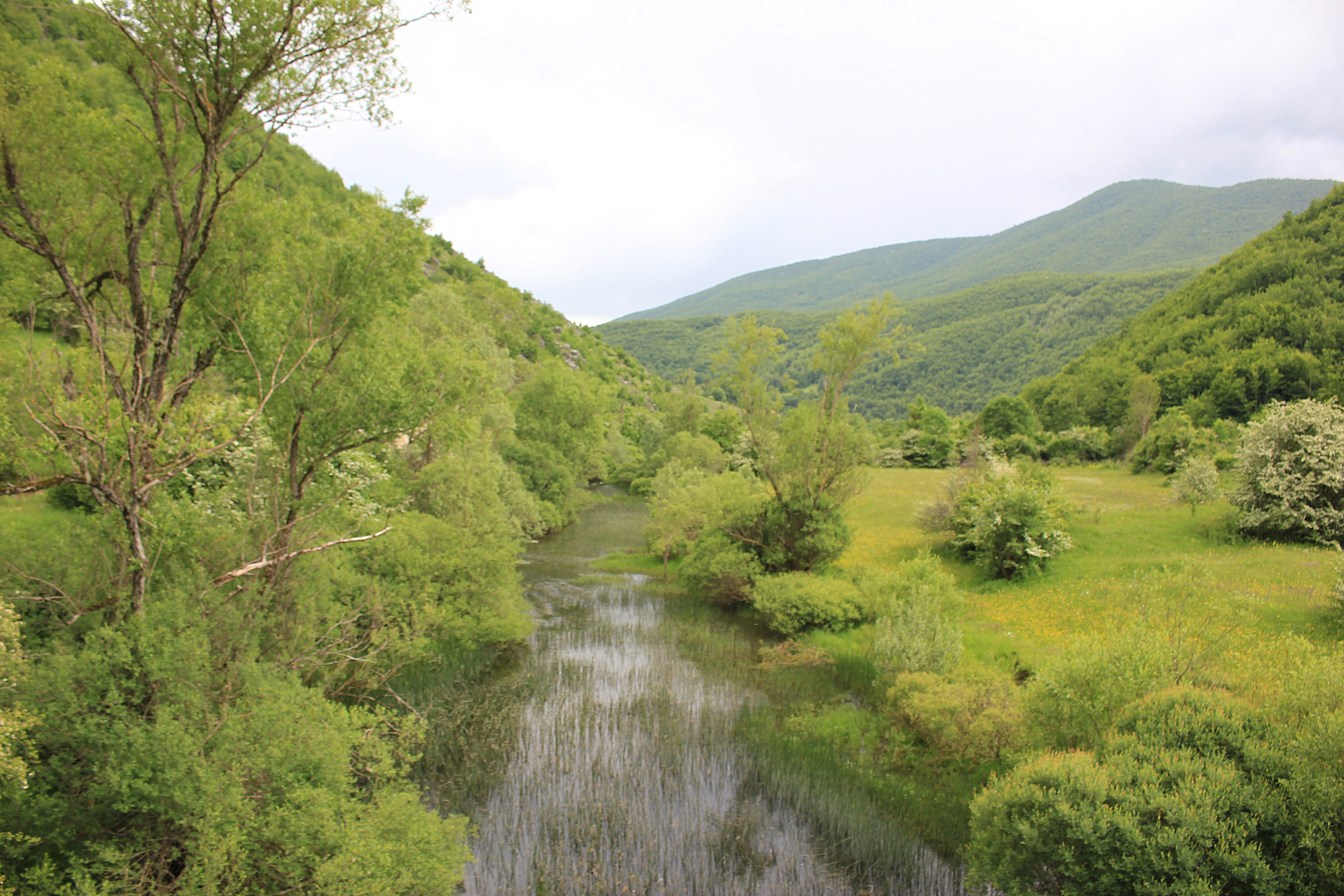
- Zalomka in gorge between Gacko and Nevesinje

- Location within Bosnia and Herzegovina

Location
- Country: Bosnia and Herzegovina
- Municipality: Gacko, Nevesinje

Physical characteristics
- Source
  - location: Brajićevići
  - coordinates: 43.231768°N 18.487102°E
- Mouth
  - location: estavelle in Biograd
  - coordinates: 43.182488°N 18.125078°E
- Discharge
  - location: estavelle in Biograd, Nevesinje
  - average: 110 m^{3}/s (3,900 cu ft/s)

Basin features
- River system: Neretva-Trebišnjica
- Landmarks: Ovčiji Brod bridge
- Tributaries
  - left: Batuša, Markov Creek, Novaci, Jamnik, Sopiljski Creek a.k.a. "Babova pit", Zovidol River, Bukovik, Vučine
- Waterbodies: Alagovac Lake
- Bridges: Ovčiji Brod bridge

The Zalomka (Serbian Cyrillic: Заломка) is a karstic river in the southern part of Bosnia and Herzegovina, and as part of the Neretva river system it is one of the largest sinking rivers in the country and Dinarides. It rises under the Morine plateau, near Brajićevići village in Gacko municipality, but also collects its upper course waters from Gatačko Polje.

== Geography ==
The Zalomka is a karstic sinking river and part of the Neretva river system that collect its waters in the southeastern Bosnia and Herzegovina. Its main feature is intermittent nature of its flow, which depends on seasons and precipitations. It is one of the largest sinking rivers in the country and Dinaric Alps. The Zalomka River in its upper course runs through western fringes of Gatačko Polje, and in a section from Rašćelice to Fojnica is called Đerope. After passing through shallow gorge the river enters another large karst field or polje, namely Nevesinjsko Polje, where it is also called the Kolješka River.

The Zalomka's major tributaries are the Batuša, Markov Creek, Novaci, Jamnik, Sopiljski Creek a.k.a. "Babova Jama" (Jama=pit), Zovidol River, Bukovik, Vučine.

The Zalomka River basin, particularly as part of the Nevesinjsko Polje, is a tectonic depression that is bounded by mountain ranges of different heights and highlands. The southern reaches of the polje is framed by relatively low mountains, while bordering on the Velež (mountain) on the east, in the north with the Crvanj mountain and the Morine plateau on the northeast, on the east-southeast are the mountains of Bjelasnica and Bab. The exact boundaries of the plateau and watersheds are difficult to determine in the karst due to the extreme porosity and cracking of the limestone that drains water underground.

== Hydrology ==
Throughout its course the Zalomka empties certain part of its waters into numerous estavelle, biggest of which is the last one near village of Biograd, which is also the lowest place of the field at 799 m a.s.l. With a swallow capacity of 110 m^{3}/s (3,900 cu ft/s), this particular estavelle is one of the largest in the Dinaric Alps' karst. It is directly linked to the source of the Bunica which is situated at 37 m a.s.l., so that the sharp difference in height is reflected in the rate of groundwater flow, whose notional (fictive) speed is up to 33.67 cm/s (13.26 in/s), making it the fastest underground flow in the Dinaric karst. The ratio between the highest and lowest water level in the underground is 312 m, which is the largest amplitude in the world.

The Zalomka retain its waters for roughly 200 days per year. During the dry season, Zalomka dries up significantly on most of its course, leaving fish-rich pools also suitable for swimming. During late winter and most of the spring, water level gets significantly higher.

== Upper Horizons Hydroelectric Power Stations System ==
Regardless of high ecological value and even higher vulnerability, the plans of harnessing hydroelectric energy from hydropower in Eastern-Herzegovina karst of Bosnia and Herzegovina are seriously considered by municipal and entity governments with revival of an old HES Upper Horizons concept, so works on the initial stage of the project are already underway with construction of water canals and tunnels, as well as a dam for reservoir of HPP Dabar in Dabarsko Polje. The location permit for construction has been issued.

Ombla catchment area between Bosnia and Croatia feed of Trebišnjica waters Ombla River course and proposed power plant site catchment area, limestones limestones dolomites flysch Adriatic Sea

The basic concept of the HES "Upper Horizons" project consists of diversion of most of the waters from Gatačko Polje into the Zalomka River. Then, a dam will be constructed on the river in Nevesinjsko Polje at Pošćenje, just three kilometers upstream of the main estavelle (sinkhole) in Biograd. A part of the Nevesinjsko Polje will end up submerged, but most importantly the Biograd sinkhole will be left dry. Part of water from this reservoir should be used for planned HPP Nevesinje, and part should be diverted through a planned tunnel to existing spring of Vrijeka in Dabarsko Polje, where another power plant, HPP Dabar, will be constructed. From the Dabarsko Polje, these waters would go through another tunnel to Fatničko Polje and then channeled through the polje to the tunnel that will finally divert these waters to Bileća and existing Bilećko Lake on the Trebišnjica river.
HPP Dabar and HPP Nevesinje are practically the principal facilities of the HES "Upper Horizons" project, however, it is planned that construction of HPP Bileća would follow, as well as an upgrade of the existing facilities on Trebišnjica River, since diversion would maximize and stabilize annual discharge of the river, namely HPP Trebinje 1, HPP Trebinje 2, and HPP Dubrovnik in Plat near Cavtat in Croatia, with construction of yet another power plant, Dubrovnik-2 Hydroelectric Power Station, on Ombla deep within its wellspring cave. This attempt was criticized already by Dubrovnik region community, with several NGO's leading the way – their main argument is too high of a cost, if ecological value and high biodiversity of the Ombla's wellspring cave system is going to be destroyed in exchange for some additional electricity produced.

=== Hydropower projects and threats of karst-environmental degradation ===
In addition to the usual multiple negative effects of hydro-technical and hydro-engineering projects undertaken in karst, where karst-environmental degradation has occurred as a result, with the main concern being destruction of underground ecosystems by drying or submerging, and the destruction of the highly endemic biodiversity, HES Upper Horizons will take from the Neretva direct flow cca 15 m^{3}/s (530 cu ft/s) through tributaries the Buna, the Bunica and the Bregava (that's average discharge of Bregava River alone). This will affect the Lower Neretva, where eventual destruction of the ecosystem has become an obvious threat to the lives of people.
The main argument in environmental circle is that concept of HES "Upper Horizons" and decision on its feasibility is based on researches and opinions made more than seventy years ago.(Kraška polja... 1967).

== See also ==
- Neretva
- Gatačko Polje
- Dinaric Alps
- Subterranean river
