= Dobrićevo Monastery =

Serbian Orthodox monastery near Bileća, Bosnia and Herzegovina

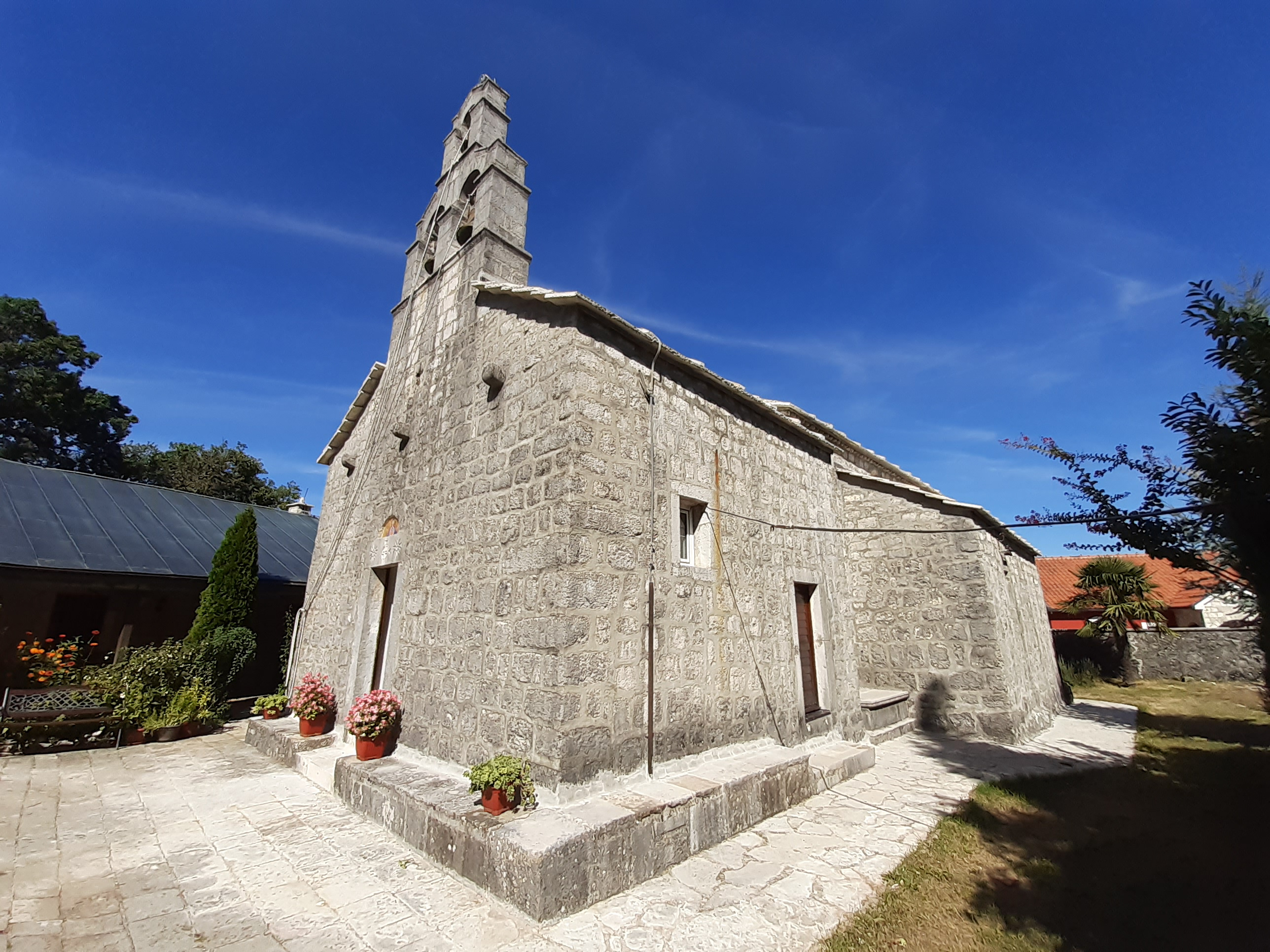

- Location within Bosnia and Herzegovina

Religion
- Affiliation: Serbian Orthodox Church
- Ecclesiastical or organisational status: Eparchy of Zachlumia, Herzegovina, and the Littoral
- Patron: Dormition of the Theotokos

Location
- Location: Orah
- Municipality: Bileća
- State: Bosnia and Herzegovina
- Interactive map of Dobrićevo Monastery
- Coordinates: 42.817801°N 18.413198°E

Architecture
- Completed: late 15th - early 16th century

Specifications
- Length: 15.5 metres (51 ft)
- Width: 8 metres (26 ft)
- Height (max): 8 metres (26 ft)
- Materials: stone
- Designated as NHL

KONS of Bosnia and Herzegovina
- Official name: Monastery of the Presentation of the Virgin in Dobrićevo, the architectural ensemble
- Type: Category I cultural and historical property
- Criteria: A, B, C i.ii.iii.iv.v.vi, D i.ii.iii.iv.v, E i.ii.iii.iv.v,, F.iii., G i.ii.iii.iv.
- Designated: 17 May 2006
- Part of: List of National Monuments of Bosnia and Herzegovina
- Reference no.: 2823
- Decision No.: 06.1-2-64/06-7

The Dobrićevo Monastery (Serbian: Манастир Добрићево, romanized: Manastir Dobrićevo), the Presentation of the Virgin, is a Serbian Orthodox monastery located in Orah, Bileća municipality, Bosnia and Herzegovina. The monastery was originally built in the 15th or 16th century by the river Trebišnjica and then moved in 1964 upstream to Orah village, near town of Bileća in the eponymous municipality, because its original location was flooded after the completion of the Grančarevo Dam in 1965.
In 2006, the KONS of Bosnia and Herzegovina designated Dobrićevo Monastery a National Monument of Bosnia and Herzegovina.

== History ==
There is no written record of the exact date when the Dobrićevo church was built, but two most frequent scholarly opinions put it between the first half of the 15th and early 16th century respectively. Architect Marica Šuput recognized the characteristic architectural elements of the church and the oldest layer of frescoes, which she concluded are placing the Dobrićevo church in the early 16th century. Zdravko Kajmaković has also addressed this problem by comparing the church to one other old cruciform church in Sopotnica near Goražde, concluding that it is the only "analogous" to the one in Dobrićevo, thus placing Dobričevo into the first half of the 15th century, and its renovation to the early 16th.

During its history the monastery was destroyed or damaged several times. It was looted twice, in 1649 and 1680. The same year cistern was built, 1672, the fire swept through the church.damaging the frescoes. From around this period the monastery was abandoned and left unattended until at least 1730, a date of earliest information of its renovation. During the 1875–78 uprising, the monastery was plundered. On 5 August 1914, the monastery was seriously damaged by Austro-Hungarian troops, who set the church on fire, destroying the entire iconostasis with many other valuables, such as books and relics, only a portion of which were saved by the monks; the murals were heavily damaged or destroyed.

=== Local oral traditions ===
According to the local legend, the monastery was built on the foundations of earlier Christian basilica which was, built by Constantine the Great and Helena. The legend says that narthex was built after the main church building by members of the Aleksić family whose descendants still lived in nearby Oputna Rudina village at the beginning of the 20th century.

== Relocation ==
The monastery was originally built some 20 kilometres (12 mi) upstream from Trebinje, on the right bank of the Trebišnjica river, above the village of Dubočani at the location called Manastirska Greda (328 m. a.s.l.). The original location was flooded with the creation of the Bilećko lake, a reservoir created after construction of the Grančarevo dam and Trebinje-1 Hydroelectric Power Station in 1967. The relocation upstream to a new location near the village of Orah, approximately 7 kilometres (4.3 mi) to the south-southwest of Bileća, on the Bilećko Lake shore, was carried out in 1964-65 in parallel with the construction of the dam for the Trebinje-1 hydroelectric power station.

Adjacent to the Dobrićevo Monastery was the Kosijerevo Monastery, just on the other side across the Trebišnjica river which today belongs to Montenegro. Like Dobrićevo, Kosijerevo has also been moved to another location, to Petrovići village, near Nikšić in the region of the Banjani tribe.

== Holydays and anniversaries ==
Slava of Dobrićevo Monastery is Presentation of Mary.

== Heritage designation ==
On 17 May 2006, the KONS of Bosnia and Herzegovina designated Dobrićevo Monastery a National Monument of Bosnia and Herzegovina.

== Gallery ==
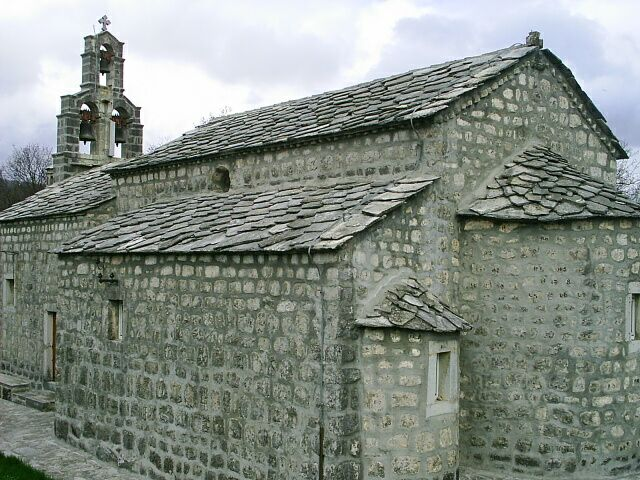
Outside

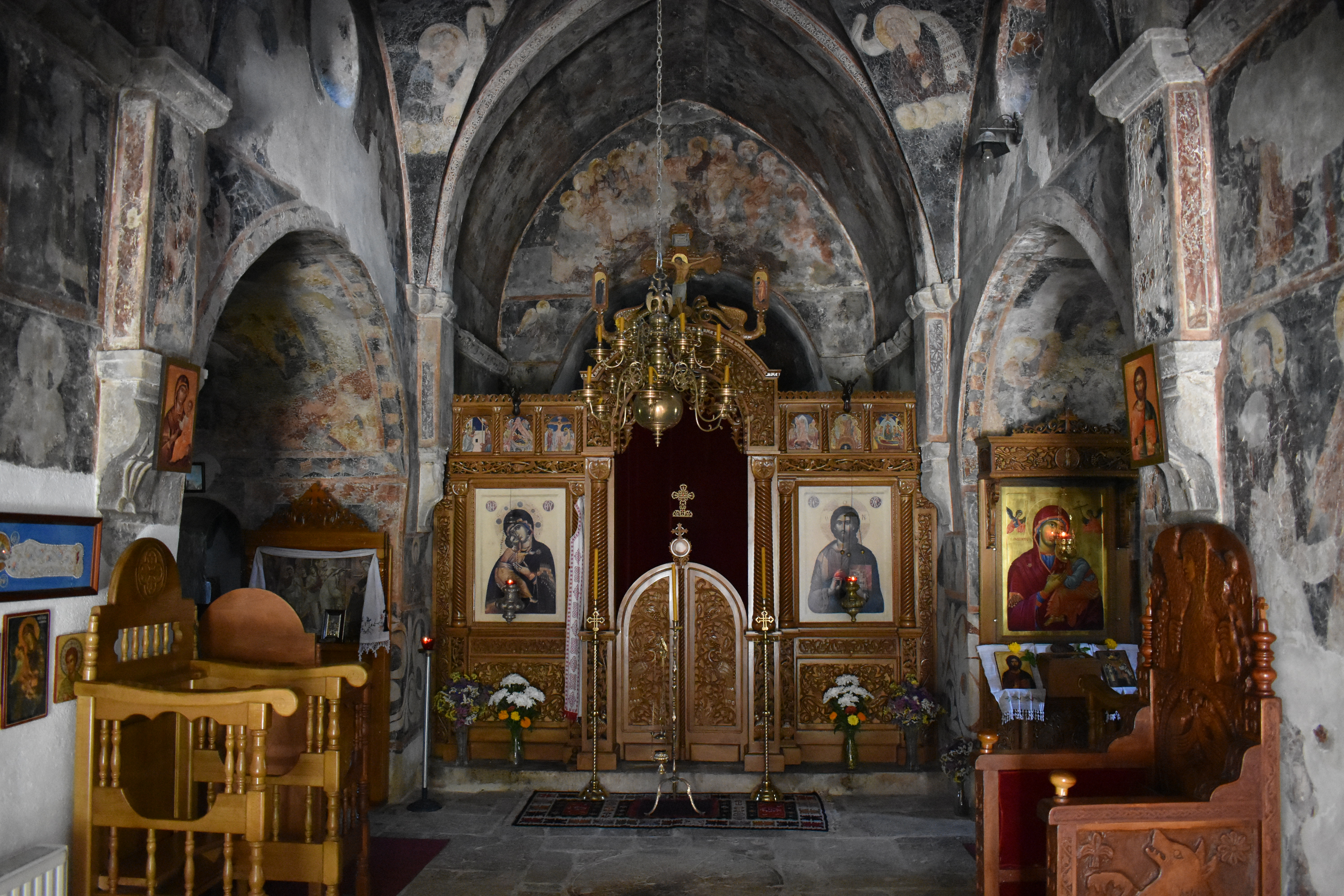
Inside

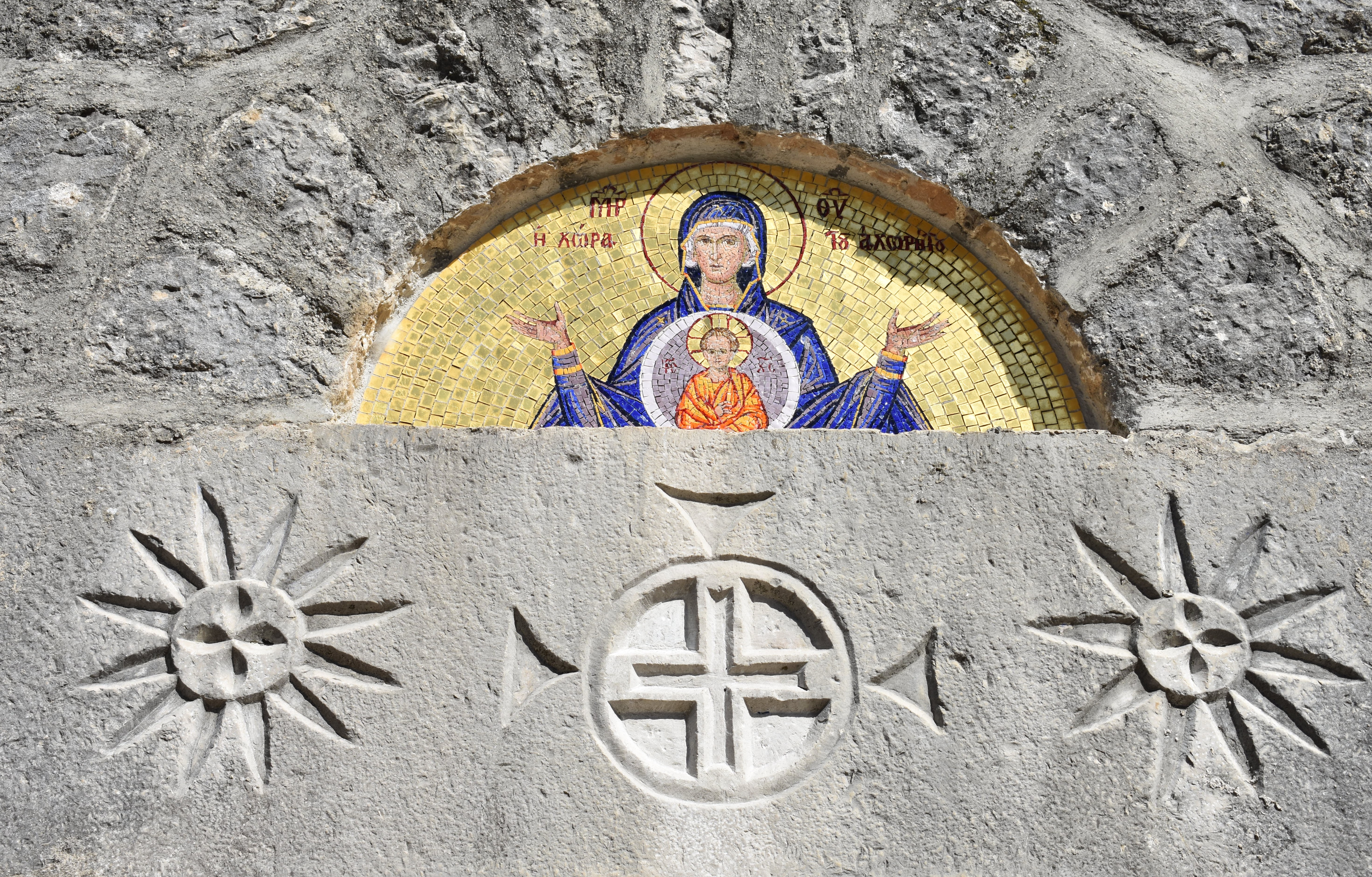
Virgin, patron

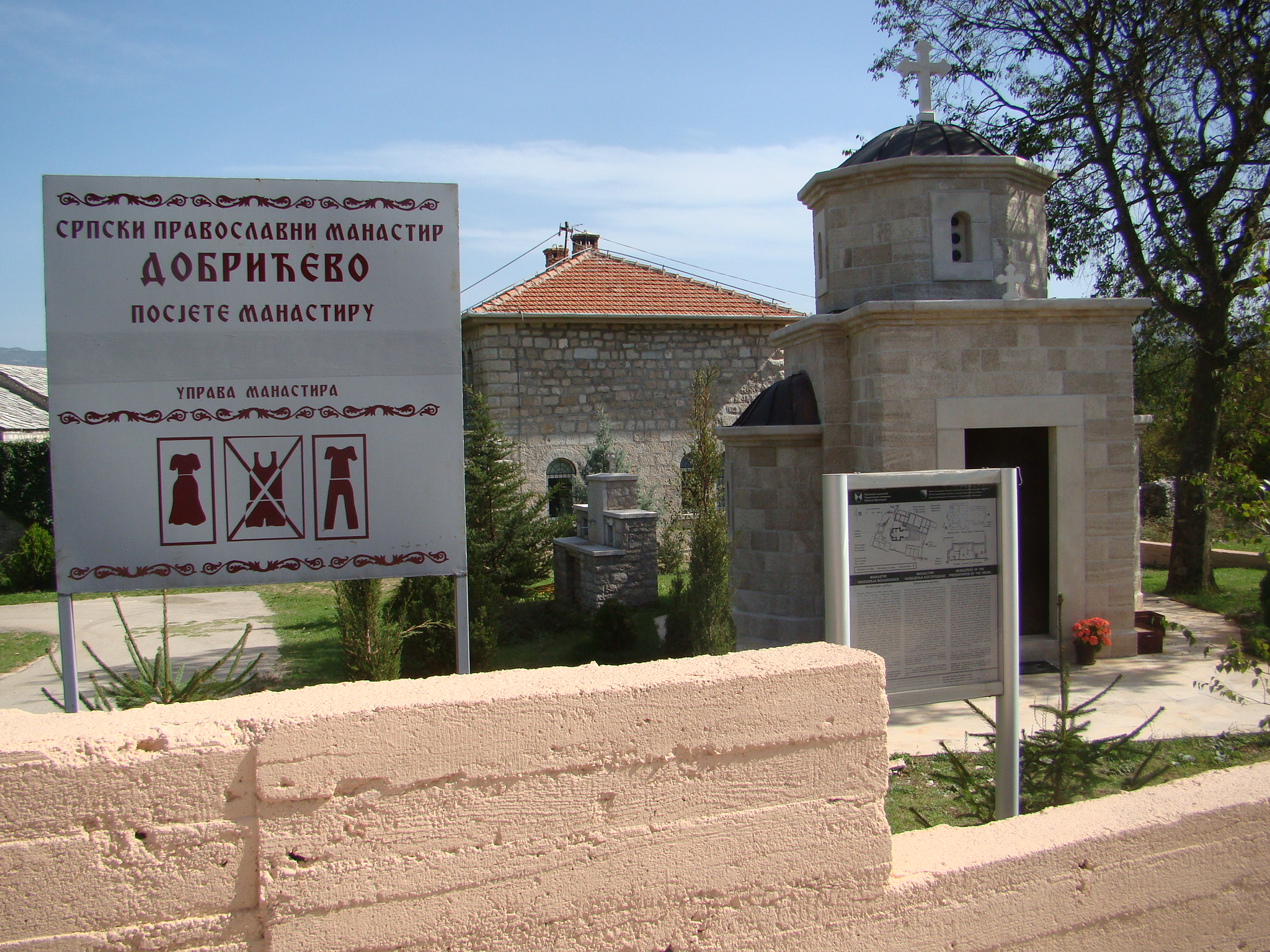
Signs at the entrance

== See also ==
- List of Serb Orthodox monasteries

== Bibliography ==
- P. Jovićević, Andrija (2011) [1930—1939], Drevni srpski Manastiri [Ancient Serbian monasteries] (in Serbian), Nikšić: Izdavački centar Matice srpske – Društva članova u Crnoj Gori, ISBN 978-9940-580-05-6
