= Trebinje-2 Hydroelectric Power Station =

Gorica Dam
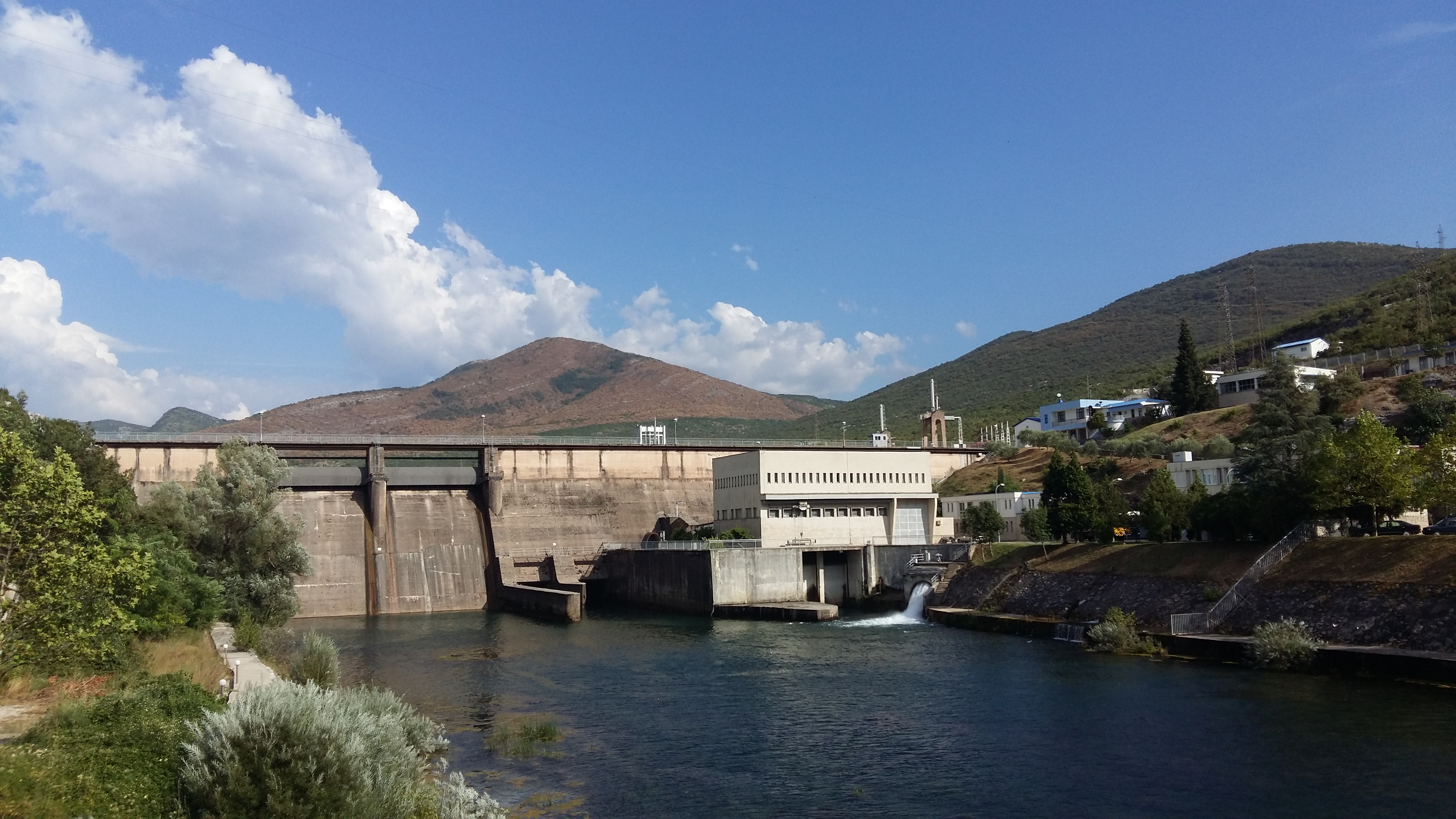
- Interactive map of Gorica Dam
- Official name: Trebinje II Hydroelectric Power Plant
- Country: Bosnia and Herzegovina
- Location: Trebinje
- Purpose: compensation basin, water distribution, electricity generation
- Status: Operational
- Opening date: 1981
- Owner: Government of RS

Dam and spillways
- Type of dam: Gravity dam, Diversion dam
- Impounds: Trebišnjica
- Height: 33.5 m (110 ft)
- Length: 185 m (607 ft)

Reservoir
- Creates: Lake Gorica

Trebinje-2 Hydroelectric Power Station
- Operator: JP "Elektroprivreda RS"
- Commission date: 1979
- Type: Run-of-the-river
- Turbines: 1x8 MW Kaplan
- Installed capacity: 8 MW
- Annual generation: 14.5 GW
- Website; HE na Tatrebisnjici.sistem - HE Trebinje-2

Trebinje-2 Hydroelectric Power Station is located on the Trebišnjica River, in the municipality of Trebinje, Bosnia and Herzegovina. It was put into operation in 1981. It is located about 4 km upstream from Trebinje.

== Reservoir ==
The Trebinje-2 hydroelectric power plant is located directly below the Gorica Dam, which is the water distribution hub in the Lower Horizons System, i.e. this is where the optimization of the use of available water is planned. Water comes here from Lake Bileća, located 13.5 km upstream.

Trebinje Lake, as a compensation basin, with a total volume of 15.74 x 106 m3, enables daily equalization of water from the Trebinje I HPP and its tributary Sušica. The Gorica reinforced concrete dam is 33.5 m high and 185 m long. The facility organizationally includes a canal, i.e. a regulated 67.8 km long river bed, which is concreted for 61 km. This canal drains part of the water towards the Čapljina pumped-storage HPP, with a capacity of 45 m3/s. These waters are also used for irrigation of Trebinje and Popovo Polje. The second tunnel serves to drain water towards the Dubrovnik Hydroelectric Power Station and is one of the most impressive facilities in the HET system (System of Hydroelectric Power Statins on Trebišnjica or Lower Horizons System). It consists of:

- intake structures with a threshold elevation of 275.82 m.a.s.l.;
- one tunnel with a diameter of 6 meters, a length of 15.4 kilometers, a lining thickness of 0.50 m;
- concrete pipeline (Mokro Polje) with a diameter of 5.40 m, a length of 1.20 km and a lining thickness of 0.40 m;
- water level of the upper chamber volume 10,000 m3;
- pipeline (vertical steel concreted in rock) with a diameter of 3.90 m to 3.30 m.

At the Gorica Dam, there are two main outlets on the left side of the dam and two spillways in the middle of the dam, which enable the evacuation of high waters.

== Characteristics ==
The power plant is connected to the 35 kV voltage network and has a local character because the average annual production is less than the needs of the city of Trebinje:

- number of turbines: 1
- installed power: 8 MW
- turbine type: Kaplan
- average annual power output: 14,5 GWh.

== See also ==
- List of power stations in Bosnia-Herzegovina
- Lower and Upper Horizons
