= Trebišnjica wellsprings group =

Groupings of springs in Bosnia and Herzegovina

- Karst spring
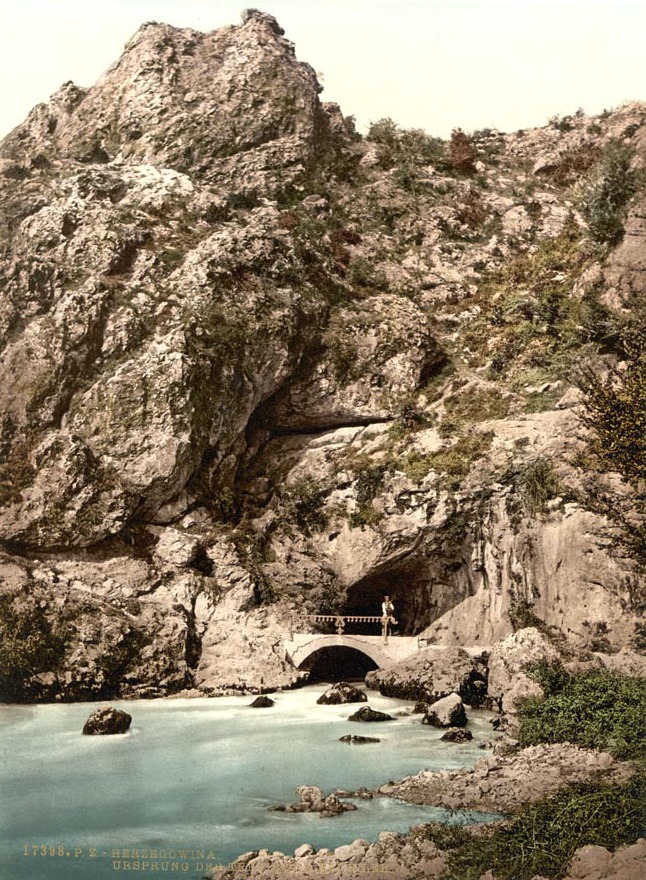
- Dejanova Pećina, primary outlet in the Trebišnjica wellspring system - photochrome cca 1890

- Location within Bosnia and Herzegovina
- Interactive map of Trebišnjica wellsprings group
- Location: Bileća, Bosnia and Herzegovina
- Coordinates: 42.864452°N 18.421261°E
- Spring source: Trebišnjica river
- Elevation: 325 m 1,066 ft a.s.l.
- Type: Karst spring
- Discharge: 125 m^{3}/s 4,400 cu ft/s to 220 m^{3}/s 7,800 cu ft/s

Trebišnjica wellspring-group is a system of two geographically and hydrologically distinct principal groupings of strong karstic springs, Trebišnjica and Čeplica, which together constitute source of the Trebišnjica river. Wellsprings are located just below town of Bileća in Bosnia and Herzegovina. The entire area where founts are situated is submerged under Bilećko Lake since 1967, formed after the construction of Trebinje-1 Hydroelectric Power Station and its large arch dam at Grnčarevo village.

== Springs ==
The Trebišnjica river emerges under the karstic plateau on which town of Bileća sits. There are two main spring-groups, first in immediate proximity of town itself, and second little more than 3 kilometers downstream at Čepelica village.

=== Trebišnjica spring-group ===
The Trebišnjica spring-group at Bileća, at 325 m (1,066 ft) a.s.l., is composed of three major wellspring outlets, "Dejanova Pećina", "Vrelo Oko", and "Nikšičko Vrelo".

=== Čepelica spring-group ===
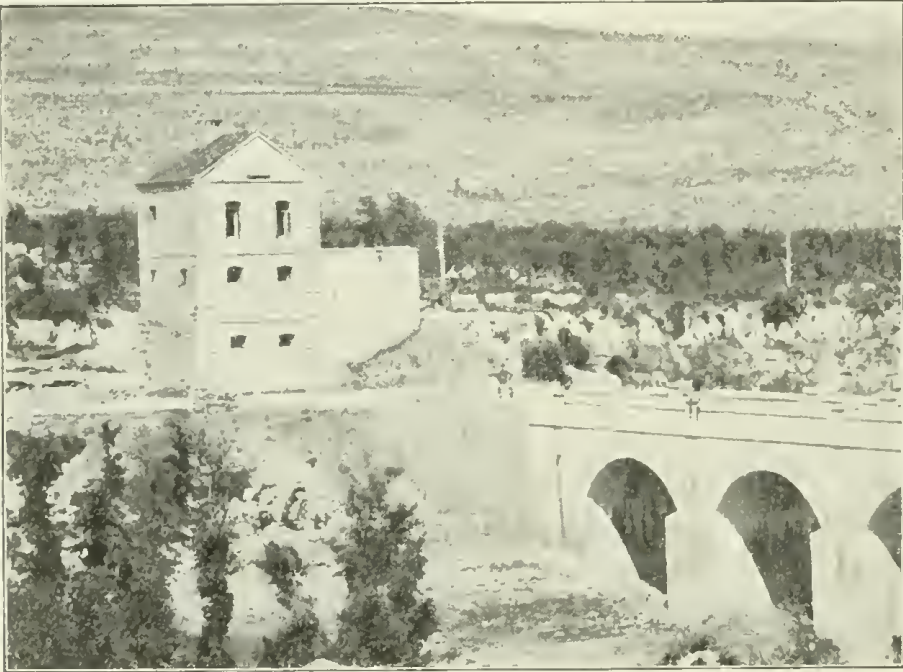
Čepelica in 1896

Another submerged springs are Čepelica river spring-group ("Čepelica spring-group"), located at Ćepelica village, 3.25 kilometres (2.02 mi) further down the stream from first group, at 324 m (1,063 ft) a.s.l. The Čepelica river itself was less than 2 kilometres (1.2 mi) long seasonal river, and flowed through valley of "Luke" (literally transl. Bay, Haven, Harbour; figuratively transl. glade(s), meadow(s)) before it meet Trebišnjica at "Mistialj" confluence. The Čepelica spring-group consists of two main karst hydrological features, Wellspring Čepo (Vrelo "Čepo") with three main outlets, and group of smaller estavelles (sinkholes) and springs on the left-bank side of the Čepelica river streambed.

=== Bileća Lake environmental and ecological impact ===
Both groups were part of the characteristic Dinaric karst landscape with significant aesthetic value. However, entire region surrounding the Trebišnjica headwaters, together with its sources, many villages and productive land, is flooded in 1967 by the Bilećko Lake, formed after construction of the Grnčarevo dam, whose primary purpose is to serve as an artificial water reservoir for the Trebinje-1 Hydroelectric Power Station turbines.

== See also ==
- List of caves in Bosnia and Herzegovina
- Neretva
- Dinaric Alps
- Karstic wellspring
