= Lake Vrutak =

Reservoir in Hutovo, Bosnia and Herzegovina

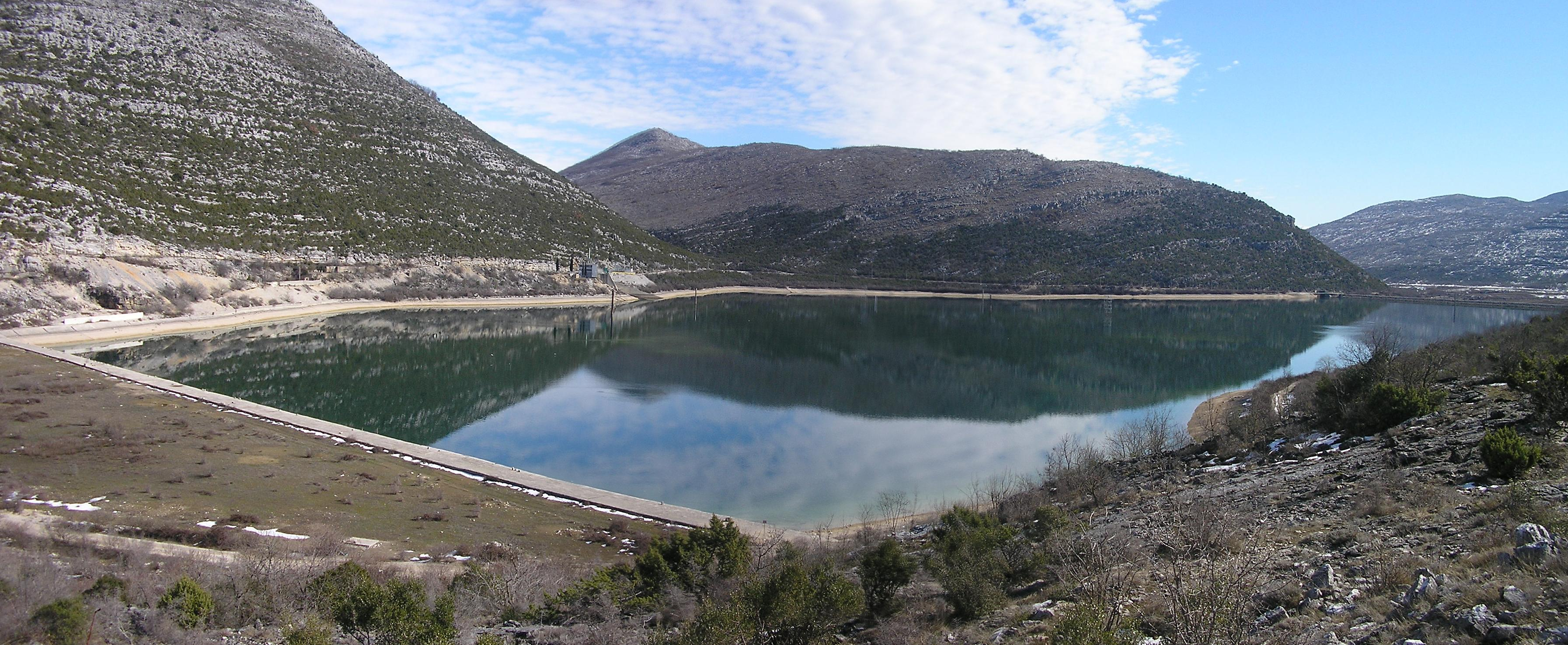
- Upper compensation basin for Pump-Storage Hydroelectric Power Plant "Čapljina"

- Location in Southern Bosnia and Herzegovina
- Interactive map of Lake Vrutak
- Location: Hutovo village in Popovo Polje
- Coordinates: 42.934681°N 17.831044°E
- Type: Compensation basin for Pump-Storage Hydroelectric Power Plant "Čapljina" (part of Hydroelectric Power System "Donji Horizonti" (English: "Lower Horizons") on Trebišnjica river)
- Catchment area: Trebišnjica/Neretva
- Basin countries: Bosnia and Herzegovina
- Surface area: 1 km^{2} (0.39 sq mi)
- Water volume: 1 million cubic metres (810 acre⋅ft)
- Surface elevation: 270 m (890 ft)
- Settlements: Hutovo village, Čapljina

Lake Vrutak is artificial reservoir on the Trebišnjica river in Popovo Polje, near Hutovo village, Bosnia and Herzegovina. The lake serves as compensation and storage basin for Pump-Storage Hydroelectric Power Plant "Čapljina".

== Hydropower and irrigation system ==
Lake Vrutak is the last and smallest of three artificial reservoirs in hydroelectric power plant system Trebišnjica - HES "Donji Horizonti", and serves as compensation basin for Pump-Storage Hydroelectric Power Plant "Čapljina". Other two being Bilećko Lake, the first and largest, and flow-regulation (compensation) basin Trebinjsko Lake just upstream of Trebinje.

== See also ==
- Svitavsko Lake
- Hutovo Blato
- Popovo Polje
- Trebišnjica
- Neretva
- Čapljina Hydroelectric Power Station
- List of lakes in Bosnia and Herzegovina
