= Kosijerevo Monastery =

Herzegovinian Serbian Orthodox monastery

Coordinates: 42°46′24″N 18°29′54″E

The Kosijerevo Monastery is a Serbian Orthodox monastery, part of the Eparchy of Budimlja and Nikšić, and located on the right bank of Trebišnjica, in the place after which it is named, in the extreme southwest of Banjani. The monastery church is dedicated to the Nativity of the Blessed Virgin Mary, and was built in the first half of the 14th century.

It was built in the first half of the 14th century. In 1966 the monastery was moved to the village of Petrovići due to the flooding of the village of Kosijerevo from Lake Bileć. During the Ottoman period, the monastery served as a cultural and political center, playing an important role in the Old Herzegovina rebellions. During the Herzegovina Uprising two assemblies were held at the monastery, in 1875 and 1878. The relics of Saint Arsenije of Serbia were held at the monastery from 1884 to 1914. Later they were transferred to the Ždrebaonik monastery. Currently, the foot of Saint Luke the Apostle is located in the monastery. Sources mention hegumen Dionisije in 1592, prohegumen Maksim who came to Paštrovići in 1714, prohegumen Stefan who in 1775 ordered a panagia made by master Đorđe Kruščević. The Turks destroyed the monastery in 1807, and it was rebuilt by Hadji Dionisije Dobrićevac in 1817. In the First World War, the monastery was partially destroyed again, and in the Second World War, the monastery's hieromonk Teofan Beatovich was killed by the Yugoslav Partisans.

In 1964, the woodcarving iconostasis was made by master Urošević from Belgrade, and the church was painted by Naum Andrić. In the monastery there is also a chapel dedicated to Saint Luke the Apostle, which was consecrated in 2004. The monastery chronicle records the gifts of the contributors: abbot Teodosije Koprivica who presented a silver lamp in 1863, abbot Teodosije Mišković who presented the Gospel bound in silver in 1860, an Austro-Hungarian officer who presented a bell to the monastery after his healing, Blagoje Mrkajić from Petrovići who also gifted a bell.

The restoration of the frescoes in the monastery began in 2018.

== Bibliography ==
- Томановић, Лазар (2007). Путописна проза [Travelogue prose] (in Serbo-Croatian). Градска библиотека и читаоница Херцег Нови.
