= Trebinje-1 Hydroelectric Power Station =

Grančarevo Dam
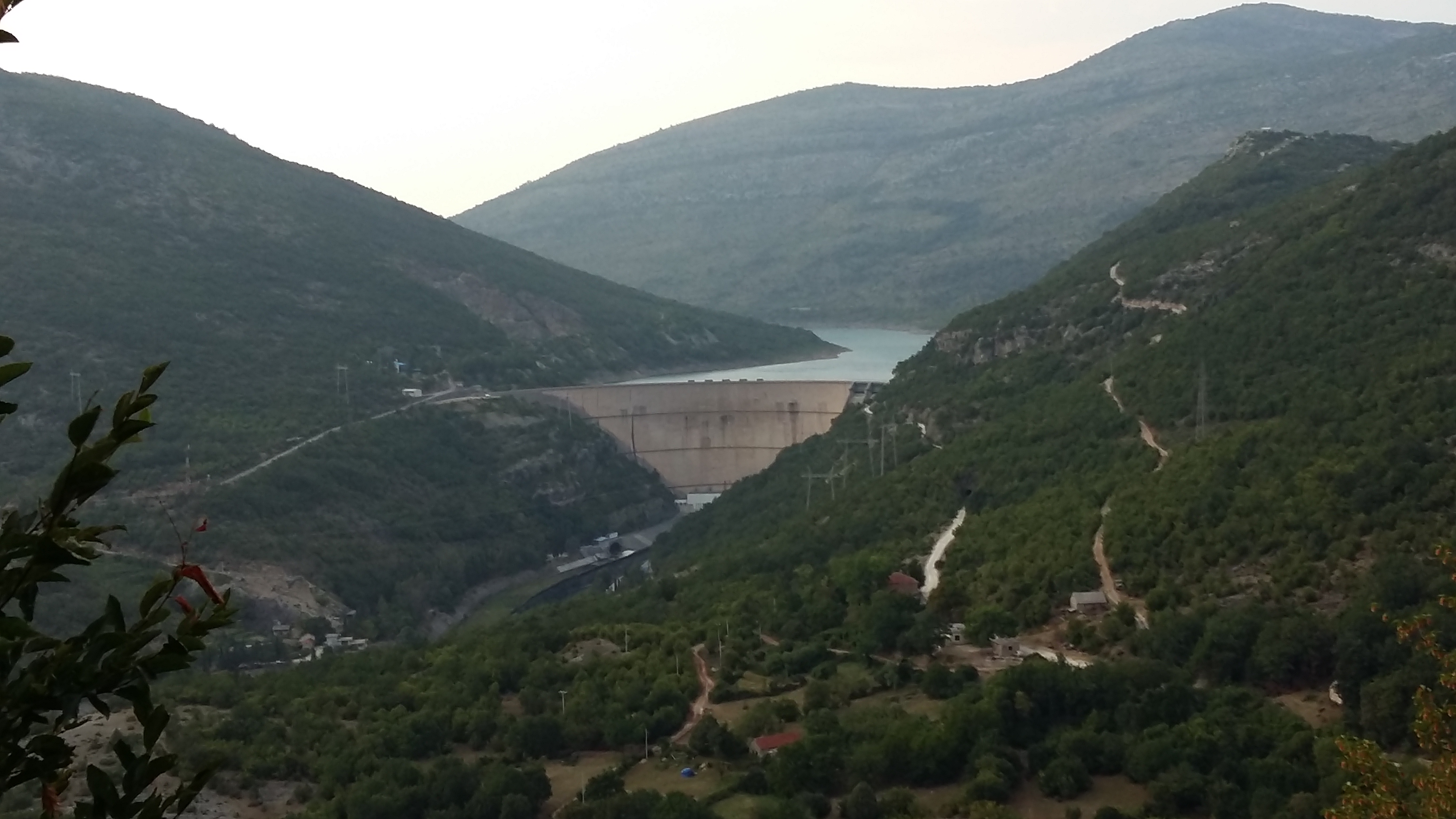
- Trebinje-1 Hydroelectric Power Station

- Location within Bosnia and Herzegovina
- Interactive map of Grančarevo Dam
- Official name: Trebinje-1 Hydroelectric Power Station
- Country: Bosnia and Herzegovina
- Location: Gornje Grančarevo, Trebinje
- Coordinates: 42°44′2.15″N 18°29′48.57″E
- Purpose: Flood control, Electricity generation
- Status: Operational
- Construction began: 1967; 59 years ago
- Opening date: 1968 (1975 expanded capacity)

Dam and spillways
- Type of dam: Arch dam
- Impounds: Trebišnjica River
- Height: 123 m (404 ft)
- Length: 439 m (1,440 ft)
- Width (crest): 4.6 m (15 ft)
- Width (base): 27 m (89 ft)

Reservoir
- Creates: Bilećko Lake
- Total capacity: 1,280,000,000 m^{3} (1,040,000 acre⋅ft)
- Active capacity: 1,082,000,000 m^{3} (877,000 acre⋅ft)

Trebinje-1 Hydroelectric Power Station
- Commission date: 1968
- Type: Conventional
- Hydraulic head: 104.5 m (343 ft)
- Turbines: 2x54, 1x63 MW Francis-type
- Installed capacity: 180 MW
- Annual generation: 1010.7 GW
- Website; HE na Tatrebisnjici.sistem - HE Trebinje-1

Trebinje I Hydroelectric Power Station or Trebinje-1 Hydroelectric Power Station is hydroelectric power plant (HPP) on the Trebišnjica River near Gornje Grančarevo in the municipality of Trebinje in Bosnia and Herzegovina. Trebinje-1 HPP is accumulation with dam toe powerhouse type of facility with a large Grančarevo arch dam. At the height of 123 m (404 ft), Grančarevo dam is the tallest dam in the country. Its reservoir, Bileća Lake, is the largest by volume in Bosnia and Herzegovina as well. The dam provides for flood control and hydroelectric power generation at Trebinje-1 HPP. The dam was completed in 1967 and its 180 MW power station, A smaller 8 MW power station, Treblinje-2, was completed downstream in 1979.

== Reservoir ==
The hydroelectric power plant is from the Pribran region and uses the water of the reservoir Bileć Lake. The Grančarevo arch dam is double-curved with a perimeter joint. The excavation of the foundation of the dam is 230,000 m3, and the volume of embedded concrete is 376,000 m3. Evacuation of large waters during operation is carried out by an open side overflow of two fields with two segmental closures, which is located on the left side of the dam. A bypass tunnel at the bottom of the right side of the dam can also be used for the eventual need for urgent emptying of the reservoir. 2 main outlets pass through the body of the dam, each with a diameter of 2.5 meters, symmetrically placed on the axis of the dam.

== Substation ==
Electric energy produced in HPP Trebinje I and HPP Dubrovnik is transmitted with two connecting transmission lines each to the 220 kV busbars of the Trebinje plant. The 220 kV plant was built with two bus systems using the mixed phase method. The connecting field enables the replacement of any switch in the power line or transformer field. With two transmission lines in the direction of TS Mostar 3 and one in the direction of HPP Perućica, the plant is connected to the 220 kV network, via 400/220 kV transformers with a 400 MVA autotransformer and 220/110 kV with a 150 MVA autotransformer with a 400 kV network and a 110 kV network. . The center of the technical information system of the Trebišnjica Hydroelectric Power Plant and the hub of the radio and HF telecommunication systems are located in the switchyard.

== Characteristics ==
The machine hall is located 35 meters downstream from the dam, from which it is separated only by the plateau of the 220 kV outlet from the power plant. It consists of turbine and generator space, rooms for diffuser shutters, control, assembly platform, as well as auxiliary rooms.

=== Power plant ===
Number of aggregates installed is 3, powered with 3 x60 MW (180 MW) Francis turbines; network voltage is 220 kV, with average annual production in excess of 370 – 420 GWh

=== Dam and lake ===
Building is 123 m in height and 439 meters in length in crown. Thickness of the dam at the bottom is 27 and at the top 4.60 meters. Reservoir volume is 1280 hm3 of surface area, at full capacity is 2764 ha. Maximum height difference, the head, is 52 m with concentrated fall of 100 m.

== Čapljina and Dubrovnik facilities ==
Reversible (pumped-storage) Čapljina Hydroelectric Power Station, using Trebišnjica waters through compensation basin Lake Vrutak, was commissioned in 1968. The river Trebišnjca also powers Dubrovnik Hydroelectric Power Station in Croatia, which receiving Trebišnjica waters from Trebinjsko Lake across the state border via derivation tunnel.

== See also ==
- List of power stations in Bosnia-Herzegovina
- Trebinje-2 Hydroelectric Power Station
