= Svitava =

Svitava may refer to:

- Svitava, Čapljina, village in Herzegovina
- Svitava (river) in the Czech Republic
