= Čapljina Hydroelectric Power Station =

Čapljina Pumped-Storage Hydroelectric Power Plant
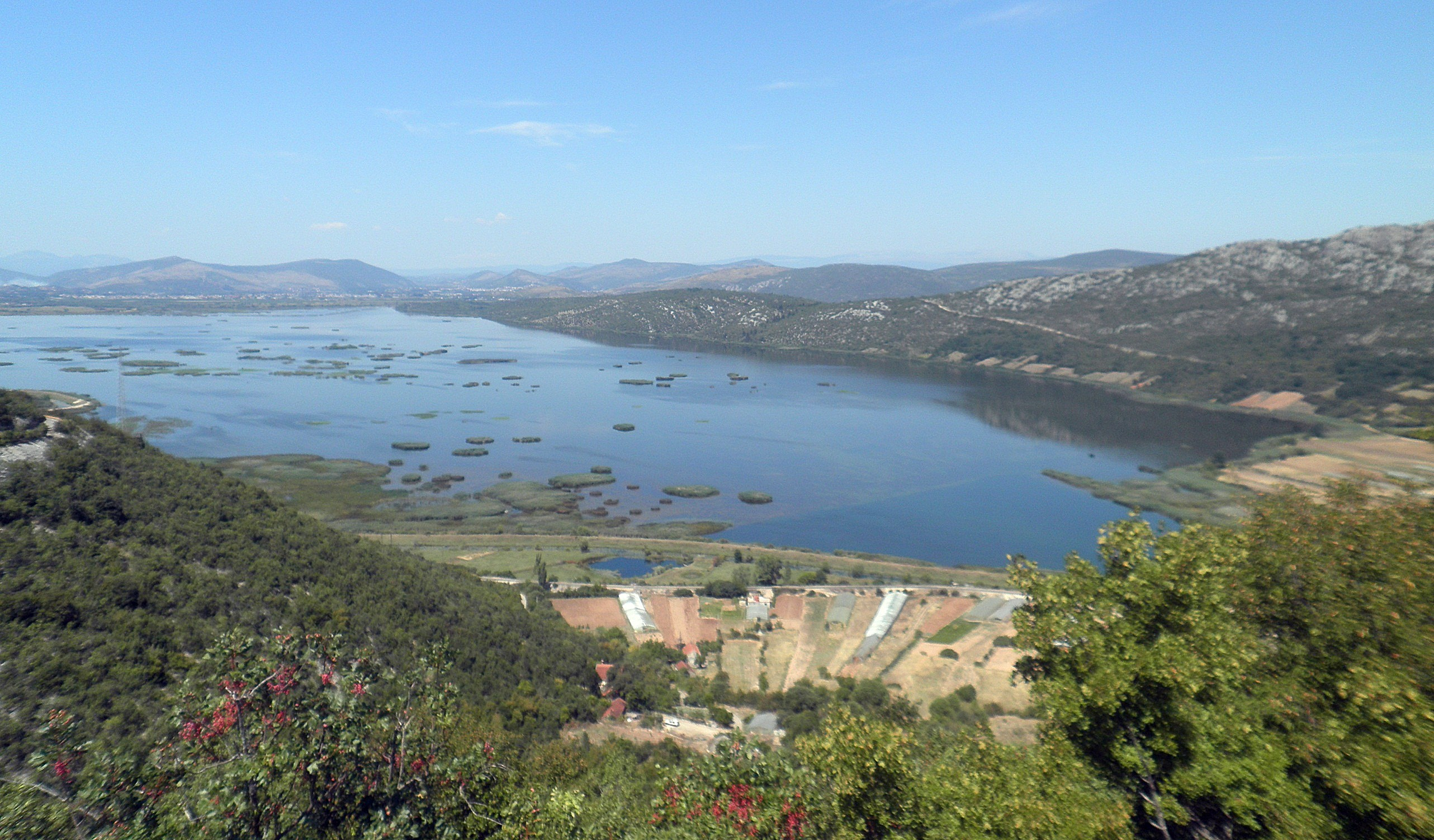
- Svitavsko Lake, lower basin

- Location within Bosnia and Herzegovina
- Interactive map of Čapljina Pumped-Storage Hydroelectric Power Plant
- Country: Bosnia and Herzegovina
- Location: Čapljina
- Coordinates: 43°00′45.6″N 17°48′14.4″E
- Purpose: Electricity generation via hydroelectric energy storage
- Status: Operational
- Opening date: 1979
- Owner: Government of the FBiH

Dam and spillways
- Type of dam: Compensation & storage basins

Reservoir
- Creates: Lake Vrutak upper basin; Svitavsko Lake lower basin
- Normal elevation: 270 m (890 ft)

Čapljina Pumped-Storage Hydroelectric Power Plant
- Operator: JP "Elektroprivreda HZHB"
- Commission date: 1979
- Type: Pumped-Storage Hydroelectric Power Plant
- Turbines: Francis
- Installed capacity: 440 MW

The Čapljina Pumped-Storage Hydroelectric Power Plant is a pumped-storage hydroelectric power plant (PSHPP) or pumped hydroelectric energy storage power plant (PHESPP) type of hydroelectric power plant, whose powerhouse (generation hall, generating station or generating plant) is situated underground near Svitava, in Bosnia and Herzegovina. It's one of country's largest hydroelectric power plants of any type, having an installed electric capacity of 440 MW.

Lake Vrutak is artificial reservoir on the Trebišnjica river in Popovo Polje, near Hutovo village, and serves as compensation and storage basin for Čapljina Pump-Storage Hydroelectric Power Plant.

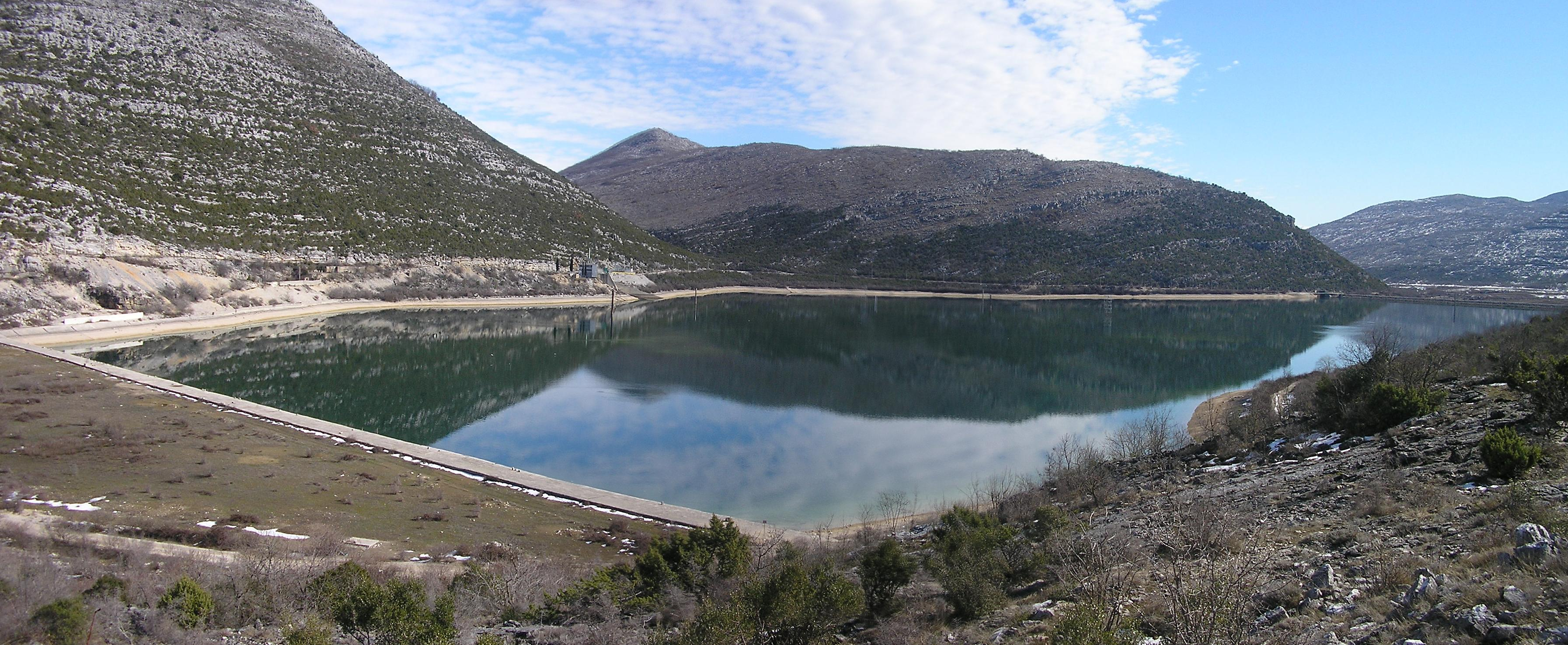
Lake Vritak - upper compensational basin for PSHPP Čapljina in Popovo Polje

== See also ==
- List of power stations in Bosnia-Herzegovina
- Lake Vrutak
- Svitavsko Lake
- Hutovo Blato
- Popovo Polje
- Trebišnjica
- Neretva
