= Gatačko Polje =

Karst field in Gacko, Bosnia and Herzegovina

- Polje

- Coordinates: 43.1322°N 18.5553°E
- Location: Bosnia and Herzegovina
- Range: Dinaric Alps
- Offshore water bodies: Zalomka
- Age: Late Mesozoic-Cenozoic (Paleogene)
- Formed by: Thrust faulting
- Orogeny: Alpine orogeny
- Geology: Karst

Area
  - Total: 57–60 square kilometres (5,700–6,000 ha; 14,000–15,000 acres)

Dimensions
  - Length: 24 kilometres (15 mi)
  - Width: 3.6–4 kilometres (2.2–2.5 mi)

Gatačko polje (lit. 'Field of Gacko', Serbian Cyrillic: Гатачко поље) is a polje (karst field) within the Gacko municipality in Bosnia and Herzegovina, spanning 57–60 km^{2}, being ca. 24 km long and ca. 3,6 km wide, in the northwest–southeast direction. It is situated between the mountains of Bjelašnica and Lebršnik on the altitude of 930 to 1000 m. The subterranean rivers of Gračanica and Mušnica cross the field. The only larger settlement is Gacko. Near the field are the mountains and straddle of Čemerno (with sea watershed), the source of the Trebišnjica, Klinje Lake and the Sutjeska National Park. The field develops agriculture and animal husbandry.

== Gallery ==
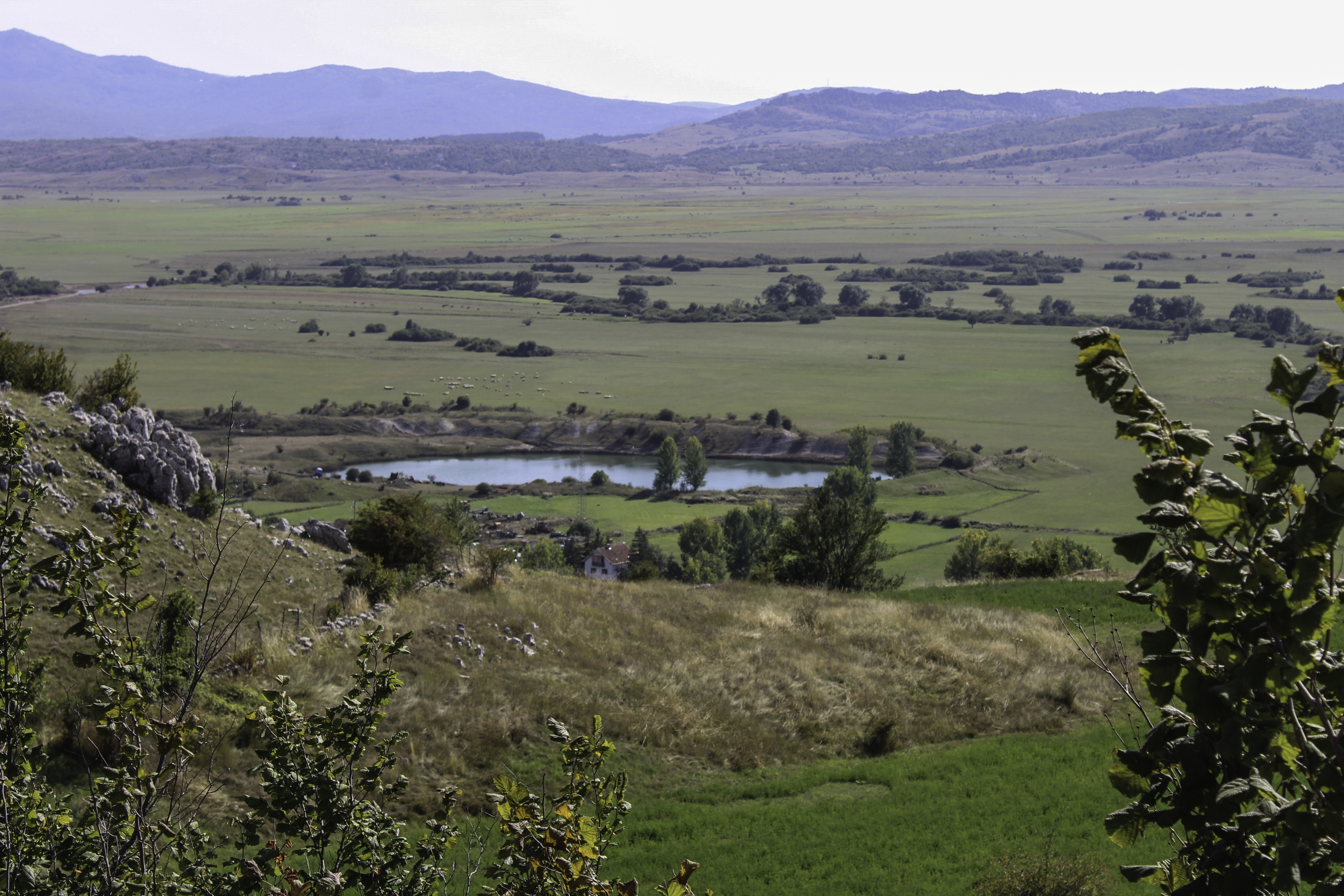
Gacko polje before the coal mine

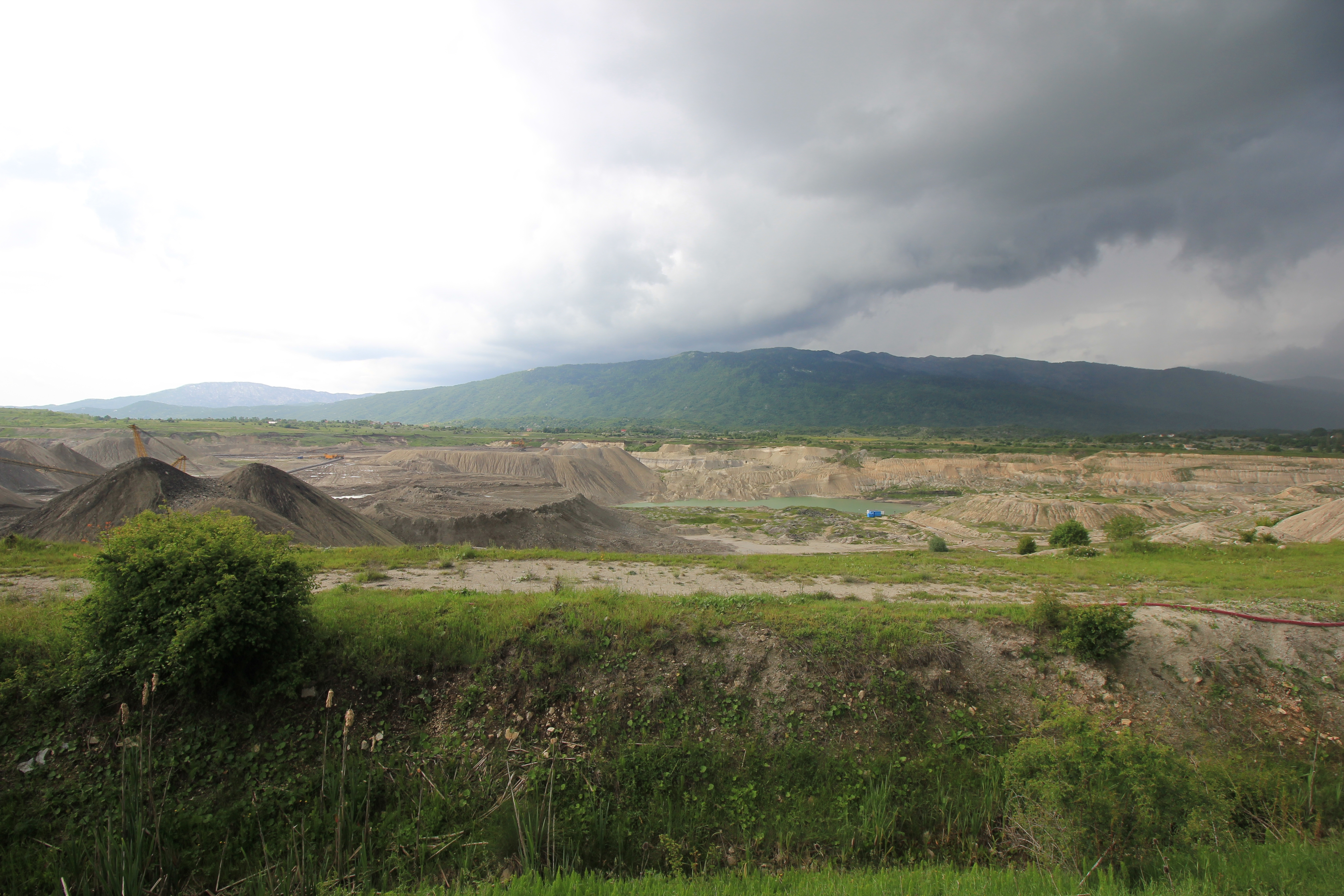
Gacko polje after the coal mine

== See also ==
- Livanjsko Polje
