= Ovčiji Brod =

Stone arch bridge in Bosnia and Herzegovina

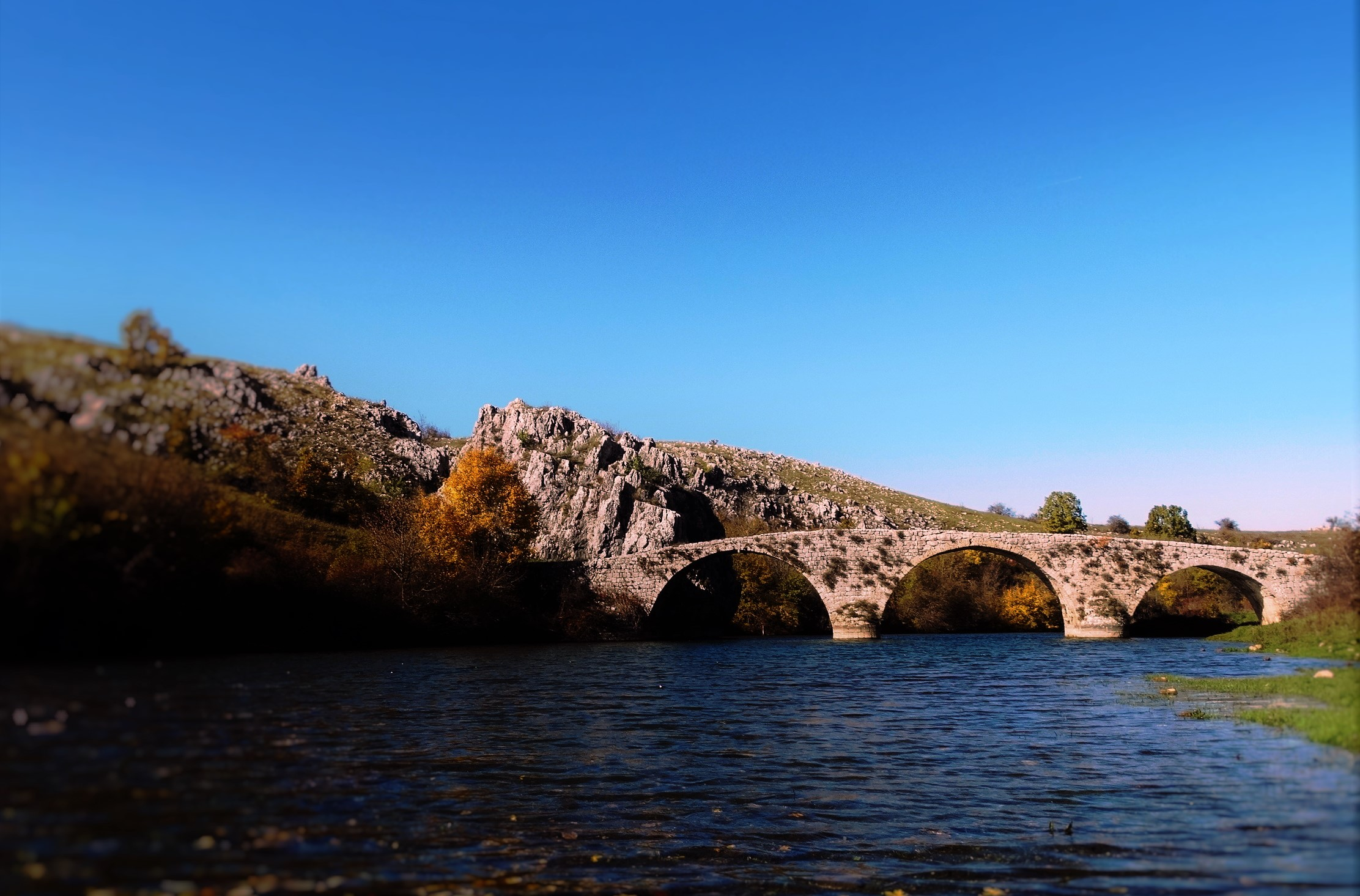
- Coordinates: 43°14′34″N 18°13′49″E
- Carries: Pedestrians and bicycles
- Crosses: Zalomka river
- Locale: Nevesinje, Bosnia and Herzegovina
- Heritage status: KONS

Characteristics
- Design: Arch
- Material: Stone
- Total length: cca 50 m (164 ft)
- Width: 3 m (10 ft)
- Height: 5 m (16 ft)
- Longest span: 5 m (16 ft)
- No. of spans: 3
- Piers in water: 2

History
- Architect: Mimar Hayruddin, apprentice of Mimar Sinan
- Constructed by: Ottoman Empire
- Construction end: 16th century
- Rebuilt: 1883 repaired arch

Statistics
- Daily traffic: pedestrian

Ovčiji Brod (transl. Sheep Crossing) is a 16th century Ottoman stone arch bridge spanning Zalomka river, which is located in Bratač village, Nevesinje, Bosnia and Herzegovina. It is another masterpiece of Ottoman bridge building in Bosnia and Herzegovina.

== History ==
The bridge was probably erected in the sixteenth century or even later, but most likely after the Mehmed Paša Sokolović Bridge was built in Višegrad. It's suspected that this bridge was built by no other than the famous Ottoman architect Mimar Hayruddin, who also built the Stari Most in Mostar. The name of the bridge (Sheep Crossing) probably comes from shepherds who used to get their sheep herds across the river by using this bridge.

== Construction ==
It is built entirely of stone, and is about three meters wide. Its slender appearance, with three arches, is very similar in appearance and design to the Mehmed Paša Sokolović Bridge in Višegrad, but with Ovčiji Brod it has not been restored as of present, unlike the Mehmed Paša Sokolović Bridge. Despite its age, and very little restoration, the bridge is still relatively well-preserved and still used today by shepherds and tourists alike.

== Heritage ==
Ovčiji Brod bridge is declared by KONS a National monument of Bosnia and Herzegovina at the session on 6 November 2016. The bridge, along with the Kalufi stećak necropolis, was nominated as potential candidates for UNESCO's listing of the World Cultural Heritage.

== See also ==
- List of bridges in Bosnia and Herzegovina
- List of National Monuments of Bosnia and Herzegovina
