= Orah, Bileća =

Orah
- Village
- Location within Bosnia and Herzegovina
- Coordinates: 42°48′54″N 18°24′58″E
- Country: Bosnia and Herzegovina
- Entity: Republika Srpska
- Municipality: Bileća
- Time zone: UTC+1 (CET)
  - Summer (DST): UTC+2 (CEST)

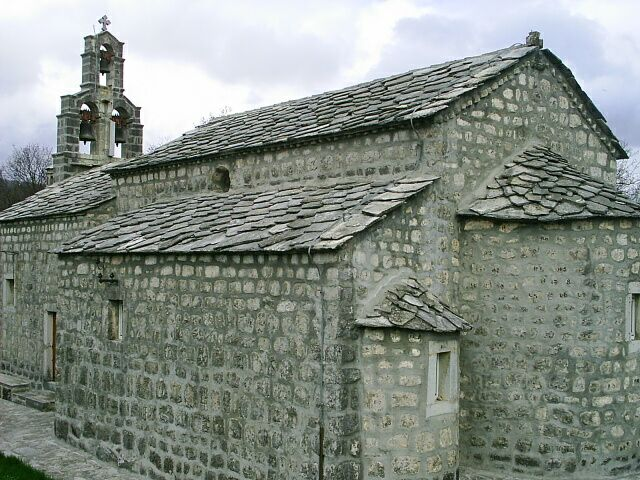
Dobrićevo Monastery, Bosnia and Herzegovina

Orah (Serbian Cyrillic: Орах) is a village in the municipality of Bileća, Republika Srpska, Bosnia and Herzegovina. It is inhabited by Serbs. The Dobrićevo Monastery was relocated from nearby to this location in 1964.
