= Rožat =

- Village
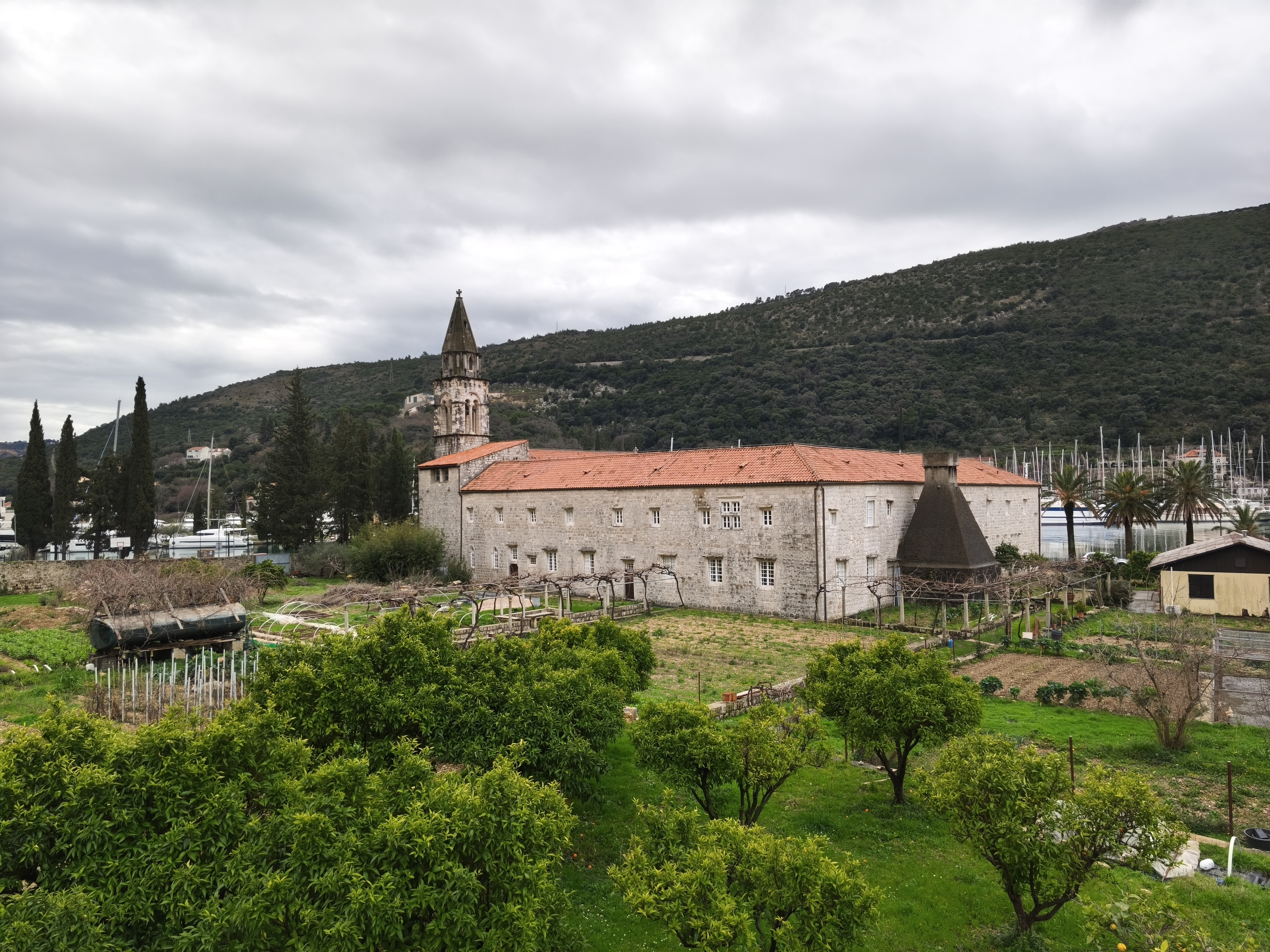
- Franciscan Monastery of the Visitation of the Blessed Virgin Mary in Rožat

- Location within Croatia
- Country: Croatia
- County: Dubrovnik-Neretva County
- Municipality: Dubrovnik

Area
  - Total: 0.35 sq mi (0.9 km^{2})

Population (2021)
  - Total: 395
  - Density: 1,100/sq mi (440/km^{2})
- Time zone: UTC+1 (CET)
  - Summer (DST): UTC+2 (CEST)

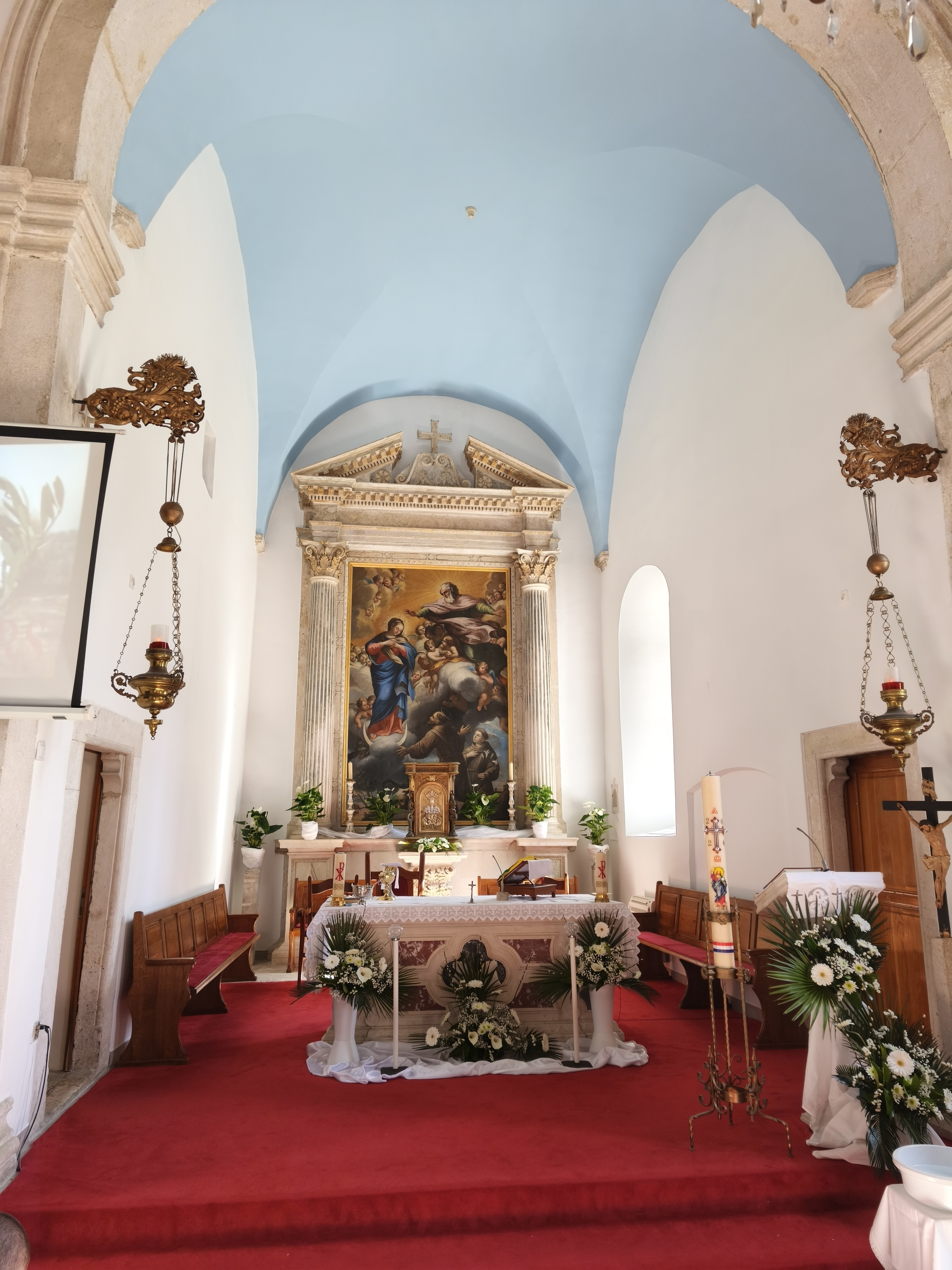
Interior of monastery

Rožat is a small village near Dubrovnik, Croatia.

Rožat is located close to the Adriatic tourist road between the villages of Komolac and Prijevor. Rožat is located on the north coast of the Rijeka Dubrovačka bay, and is about 5 kilometers northwest of the city of Dubrovnik.

== History ==
In Rožat there is one Catholic church and the Franciscan Monastery of the Visitation of the Blessed Virgin Mary (Our Lady of Visitation). It was built in 1393 by the Bosnian Franciscans.

== Demographics ==
According to the 2021 census, its population was 395. It had a population of 340 in 2011.

== Economy ==
In the village people engaged with fishing, tourism and agriculture.
