= Bjelasnica =

- Location within Bosnia and Herzegovina

Highest point
- Coordinates: 42°50′03″N 18°07′57″E

Geography
- Location: Bosnia and Herzegovina

Bjelasnica is a mountain range in the south of Bosnia and Herzegovina, specifically in the municipality of Trebinje. It is located on the right side of the river Trebišnjica. The highest peaks are Motka (1396 m), Ilija (1338 m) and Siljevac (1297 m).
