= Dubrovnik Hydroelectric Power Plant =

Power plant in Dubrovnik, Croatia

Dubrovnik Hydro Power Plant
- Location within Croatia
- Interactive map of Dubrovnik Hydro Power Plant
- Official name: Dubrovnik Hydro Power Plant
- Country: Croatia
- Location: Dubrovnik
- Purpose: Electricity generation
- Status: Operational
- Opening date: 1980
- Owner: Government of the Republic of Croatia
- Operator: JP "Hrvatska Elektroprivreda" <! -- JP "Elektroprivreda RS" -->

Dam and spillways
- Type of dam: Gravity dam
- Impounds: Trebišnjica
- Height: 33.5
- Length: 185
- Spillways: 4

Reservoir
- Creates: Lake Trebinje

Plat Hydroelectric Power Plant
- Operator: JP "Hrvatska Elektroprivreda"
- Type: diversion
- Turbines: 2x125 MW Francis
- Installed capacity: 250 MW

Dubrovnik Hydro Power Plant, also known as Plat Hydroelectric Power Plant, was built in 1965. It is a large power plant in Croatia that has two turbines with a nominal capacity of 126 MW each having a total capacity of 250 MW.

The Dubrovnik HPP facilities are located in two countries; the Gorica dam with the compensation basin and the inlet structure are in the Federation of Bosnia and Herzegovina, the inlet tunnel with reinforced concrete pipeline is partly in the FBiH and partly in the Republic of Croatia, while the water chamber, pressure pipeline, powerhouse, outlet tunnels and breakwater are in the Republic of Croatia.

The powerhouse is located underground and is designed for four production units, of which the first phase was implemented in 1969 with two production units (A and B) with Francis turbines that initially had 108 MW each.

The power plants was revitalised between 2013-2015 with the installation which replaced the two Francis turbines.

In 2016, production was relaunched.

It is operated by Hrvatska elektroprivreda.
