= Brajićevići =

Brajićevići Брајићевићи
- Village
- Location within Bosnia and Herzegovina
- Coordinates: 43°14′N 18°29′E
- Country: Bosnia and Herzegovina
- Entity: Republika Srpska
- Municipality: Gacko
- Time zone: UTC+1 (CET)
  - Summer (DST): UTC+2 (CEST)

Brajićevići (Serbian Cyrillic: Брајићевићи) is a village in the municipality of Gacko, Republika Srpska, Bosnia and Herzegovina.
