= Zdravko Kajmaković =

Bosnia and Yugoslav art historian (1929–2009)

Zdravko Kajmaković (Serbian: Здравко Кајмаковић) (10 October 1929 in Modran, Bijeljina – 19 March 2009, in Sarajevo) was an art historian and ranks among the leading scholars of the latter half of the twentieth century in Bosnia and Herzegovina. In his day, he was at the very forefront of Bosnian and Herzegovinian culture, as well as Serbian culture and science.
