= Hutovo =

- Village
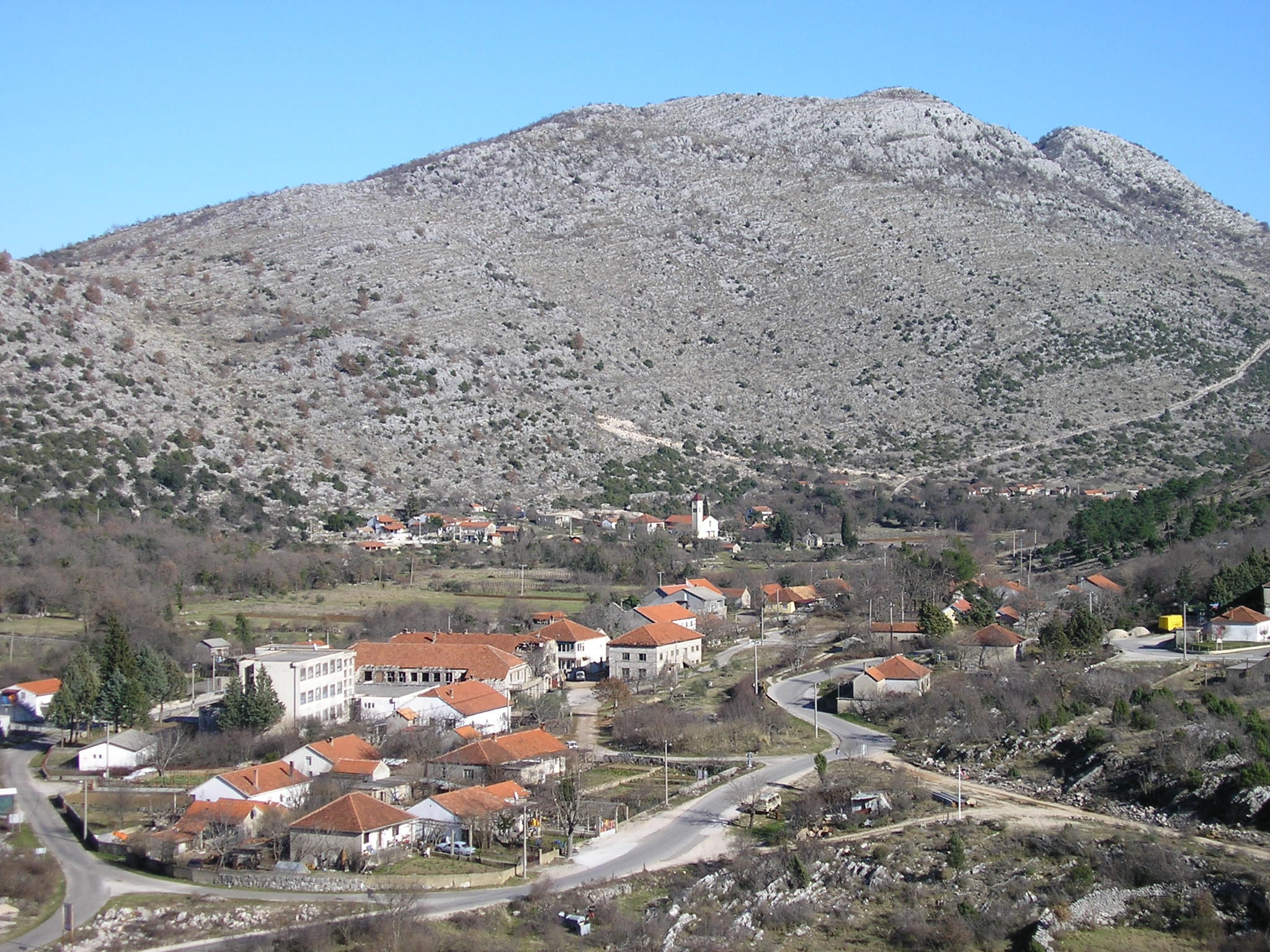

- Location within Bosnia and Herzegovina
- Coordinates: 42.9574756°N 17.8040004°E
- Country: Bosnia and Herzegovina
- Entity: Federation of Bosnia and Herzegovina
- Canton: Herzegovina-Neretva
- Municipality: Neum

Area
  - Total: 7.14 sq mi (18.50 km^{2})

Population (2013)
  - Total: 201
  - Density: 28.1/sq mi (10.9/km^{2})
- Time zone: UTC+1 (CET)
  - Summer (DST): UTC+2 (CEST)

Hutovo is a village in the municipality of Neum, Bosnia and Herzegovina.

== Demographics ==
According to the 2013 census, its population was 201.

Ethnicity in 2013
Ethnicity	Number	Percentage
Croats	200	99.5%
Bosniaks	1	0.5%
Total	201	100%
