= Svitava, Čapljina =

Svitava
- Village
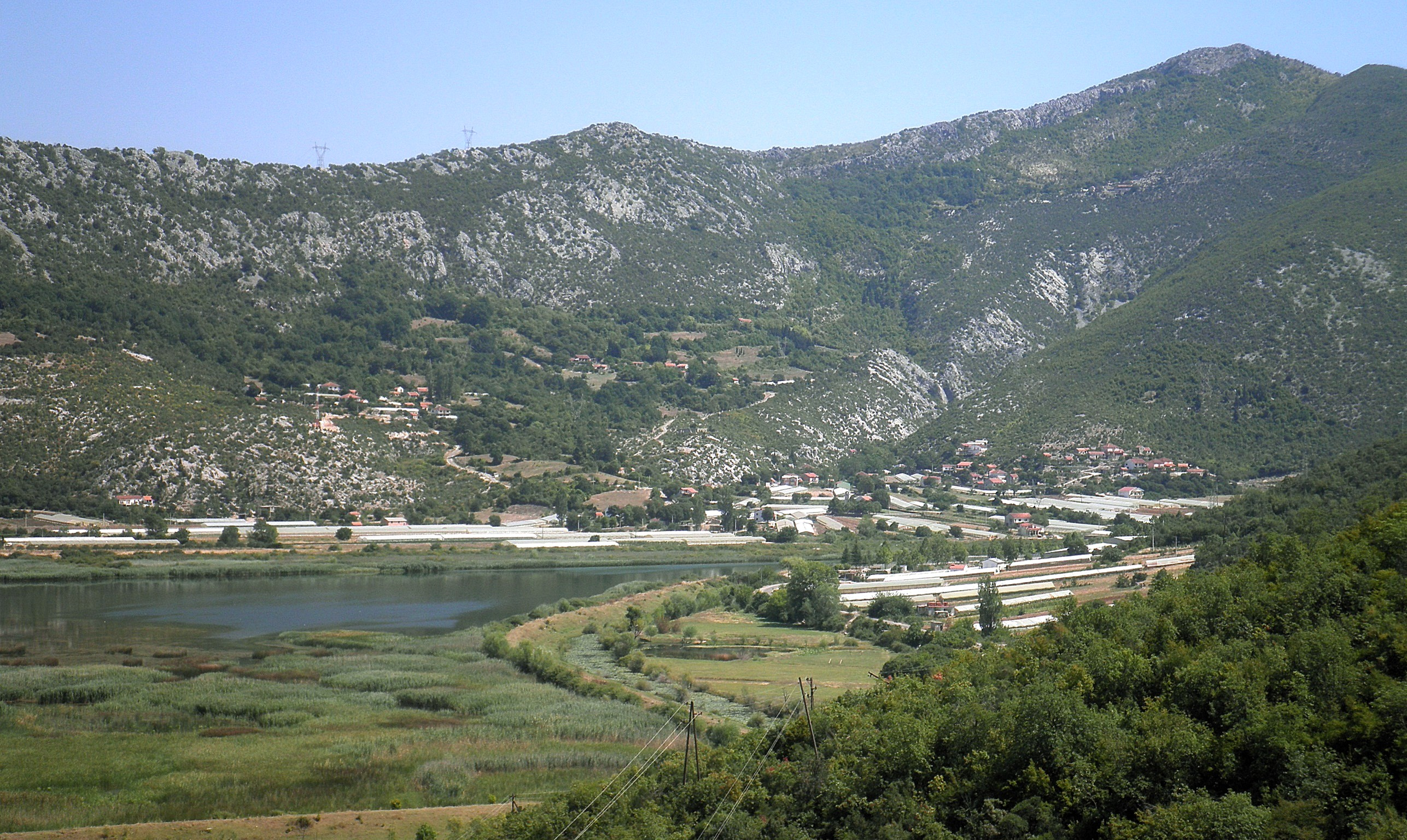

- Location within Bosnia and Herzegovina
- Country: Bosnia and Herzegovina
- Entity: Federation of Bosnia and Herzegovina
- Canton: Herzegovina-Neretva
- Municipality: Čapljina

Area
  - Total: 4.73 sq mi (12.25 km^{2})

Population (2013)
  - Total: 239
  - Density: 50.5/sq mi (19.5/km^{2})
- Time zone: UTC+1 (CET)
  - Summer (DST): UTC+2 (CEST)

Svitava is a village in Bosnia and Herzegovina. According to the 1991 census, the village is located in the municipality of Čapljina.

== Demographics ==
According to the 2013 census, its population was 239, all Croats.
