= Trebinjsko Lake =

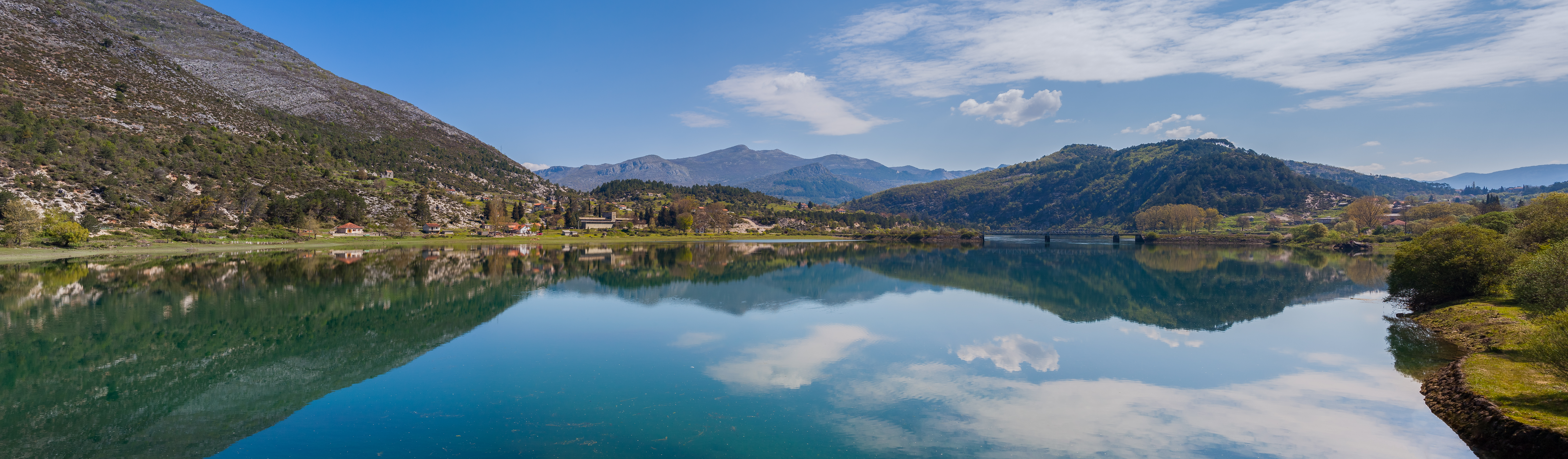
- Gornji Orahovac, Bosnia and Herzegovina

- Location within Bosnia and Herzegovina
- Interactive map of Trebinjsko Lake
- Location: Bosnia and Herzegovina
- Coordinates: 42°42′21″N 18°23′54″E
- Type: artificial lake

Trebinjsko Lake is an artificial lake of Bosnia and Herzegovina. It is located in the municipality of Trebinje. it was created as a reservoir by damming the Trebišnjica river just few kilometers upstream from Trebinje town with a facility and dam, Trebinje II Hydroelectric Power Station.

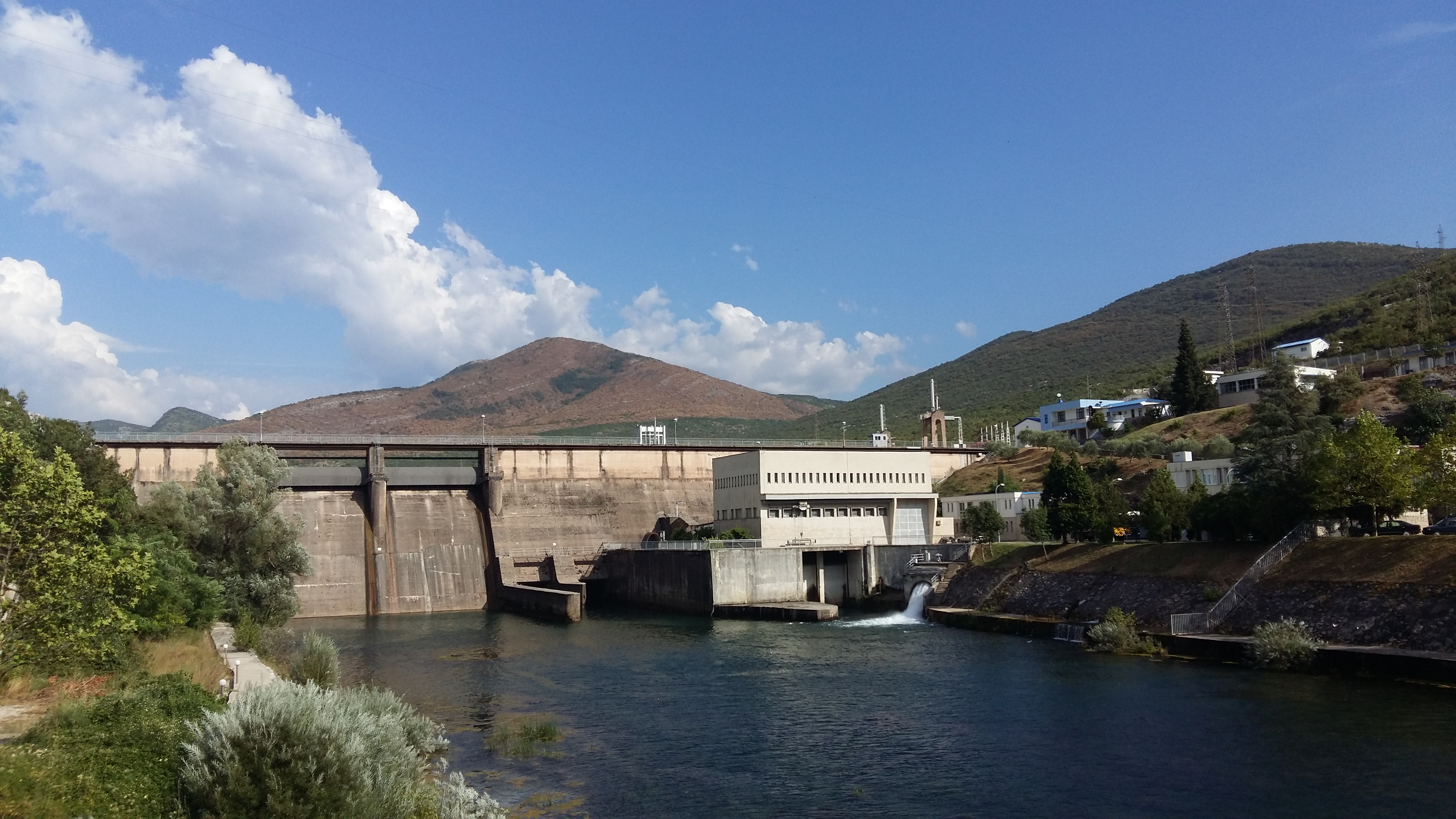
Hydroelectric power plant Trebinje II

== See also ==
- List of power stations in Bosnia-Herzegovina
- List of lakes in Bosnia and Herzegovina
- Trebinje I Hydroelectric Power Station
- Arslanagić Bridge
