= Prijevor, Dubrovnik =

Prijevor
- Village
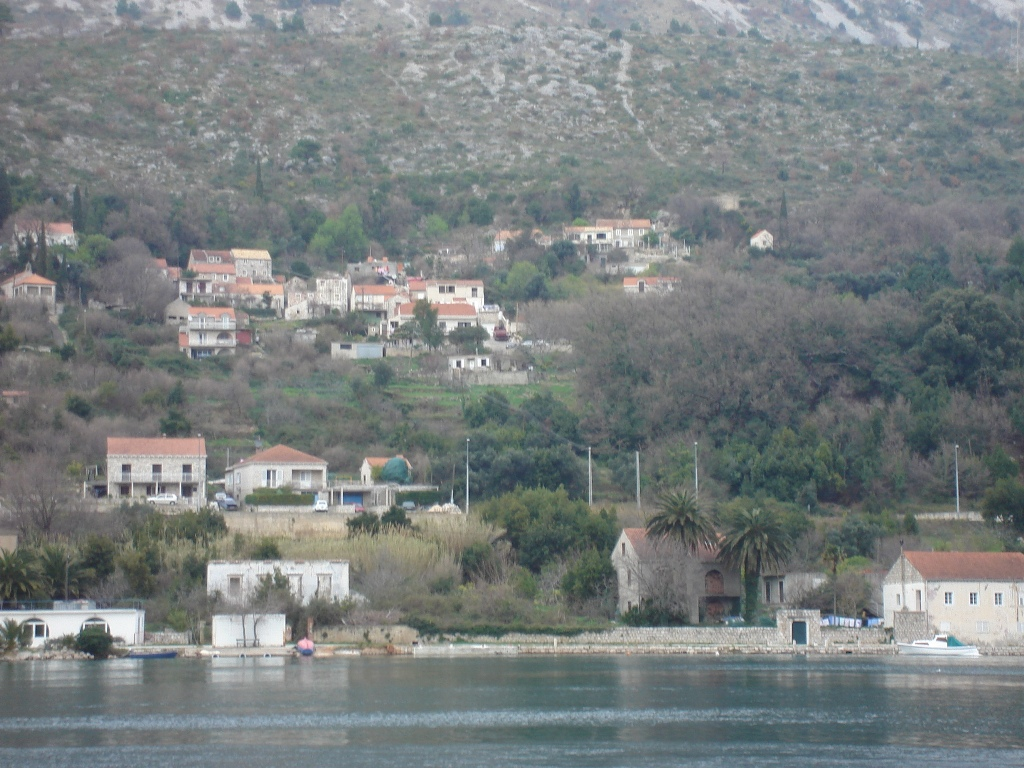
- Prijevor

- Location within Croatia
- Country: Croatia
- County: Dubrovnik-Neretva County
- Municipality: Dubrovnik

Area
  - Total: 0.46 sq mi (1.2 km^{2})

Population (2021)
  - Total: 460
  - Density: 990/sq mi (380/km^{2})
- Time zone: UTC+1 (CET)
  - Summer (DST): UTC+2 (CEST)

Prijevor is a small village in Rijeka Dubrovačka, Dubrovnik-Neretva County, Croatia.

== History ==
- earthquake 1979.
- Croatian War of Independence 1991–1993.

== Demographics ==
According to the 2021 census, its population was 460.

- predominantly Croats

== Economy ==
- tourism
- agriculture
- fishing
