= Estavelle =

Karst ground orifice which is sometimes a sink and other times a source

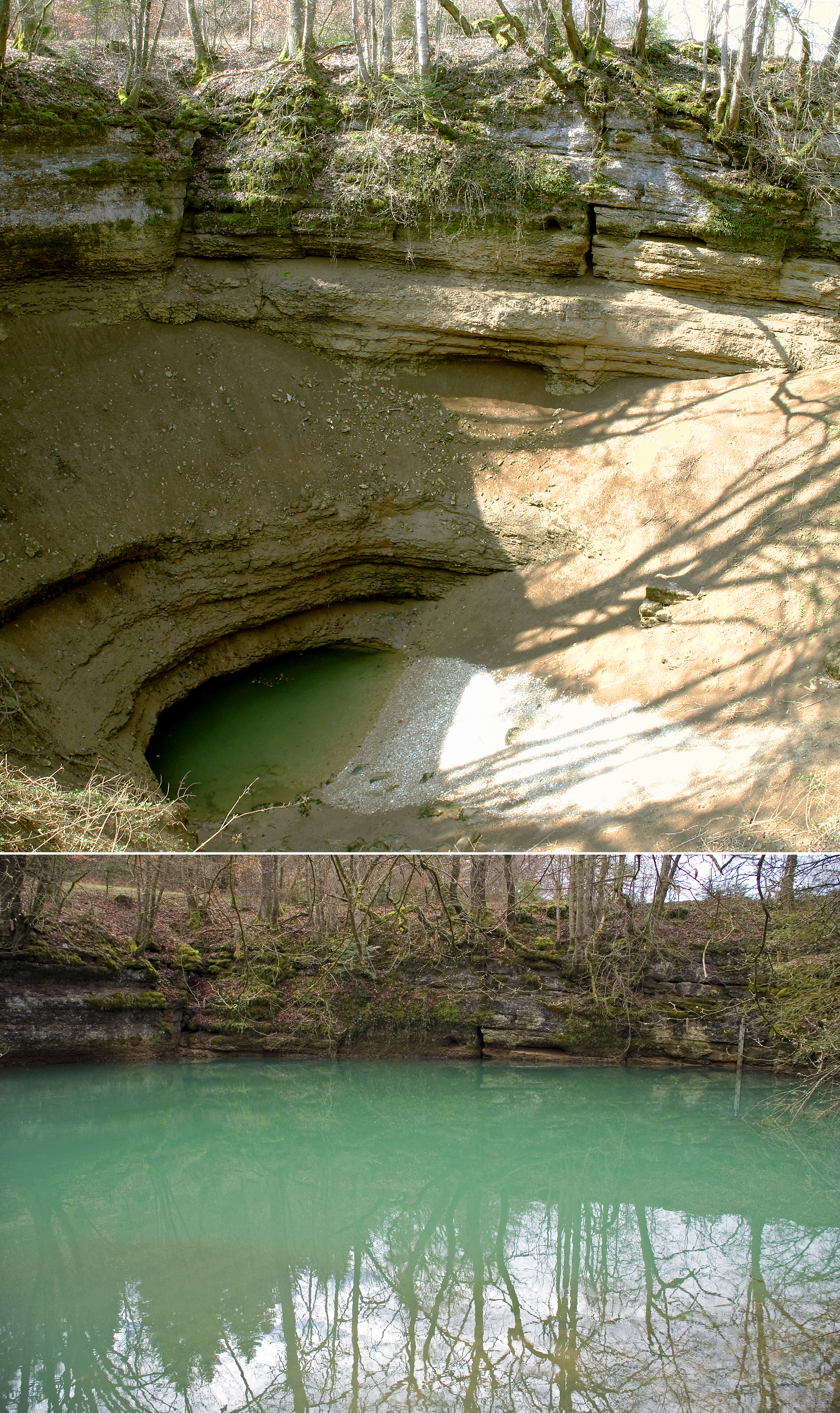
Creux-Genat, an intermittent karst estavelle between Chevenez and Porrentruy in the Ajoie, recorded on April 2, 2005 and April 17, 2006.

In karst geology, estavelle or inversac is a ground orifice which, depending on weather conditions and season, can serve either as a sink or as a source of fresh water. It is a type of ponor or sinkhole.
