= Trebišnjica =

River in Bosnia and Herzegovina

Trebišnjica Требишњица
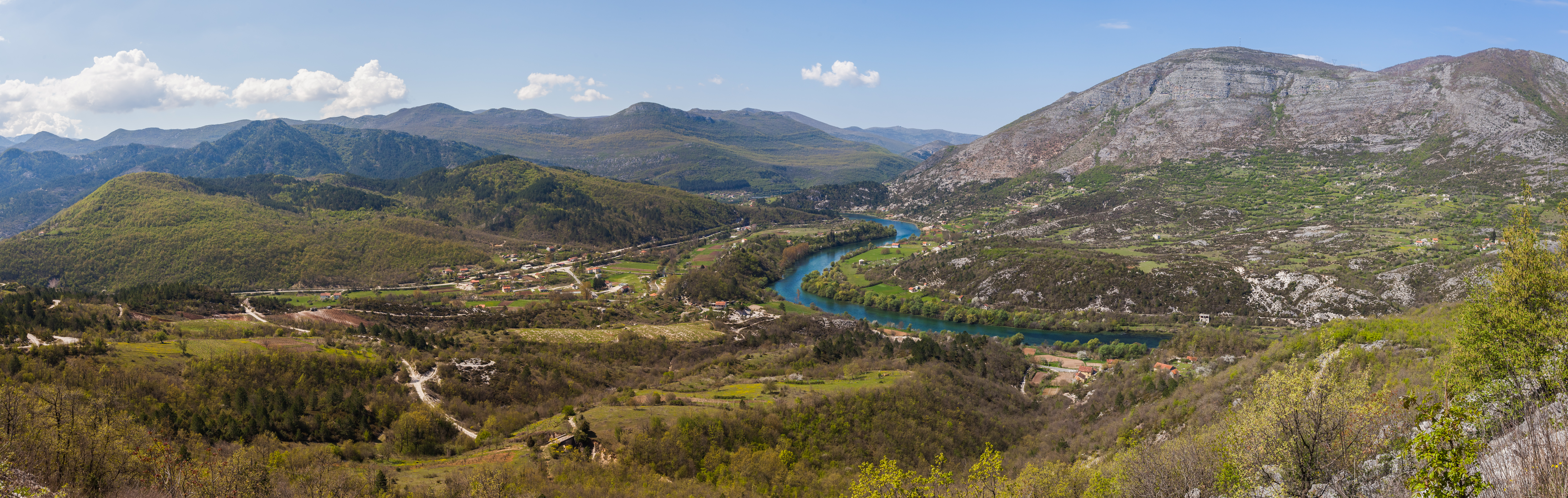
- Trebišnjica River

- Location within Bosnia and Herzegovina

Location
- Country: Bosnia and Herzegovina

Physical characteristics
- Source: Trebišnjica wellsprings group is a system consisting of 3 large karst spring zones, with Dejanova Pećina as primer wellspring
  - location: Bileća
  - coordinates: 42.8644525°N 18.4212613°E
- 2nd source: wellspring Oko
  - location: Bileća
  - coordinates: 42.862864°N 18.4227204°E
- 3rd source: wellspring Nikšičko Vrelo
  - location: Bileća
  - coordinates: 42.8586959°N 18.4248447°E
- 4th source: wellspring Čepo, main in Čeplica springs group
  - location: Čeplica
  - coordinates: 42.8448369°N 18.3962417°E
- Mouth: 1) in Bosnia and Herzegovina: to Neretva River via Lake Vrutak→Krupa→Neretva River; 2) in Croatia via Cavtat HPP; and directly into Adriatic Sea: a) via Ombla near Dubrovačka Rijeka, b) via group of strong undersea springs (Serbo-Croatian: vrulja) near Cavtat.
  - location: Ravno
  - coordinates: 42.930725°N 17.8321838°E
- Length: 96.5 km (60.0 mi)
- Basin size: The Neretva with Trebišnjica

Basin features
- Progression: Neretva→ Adriatic Sea

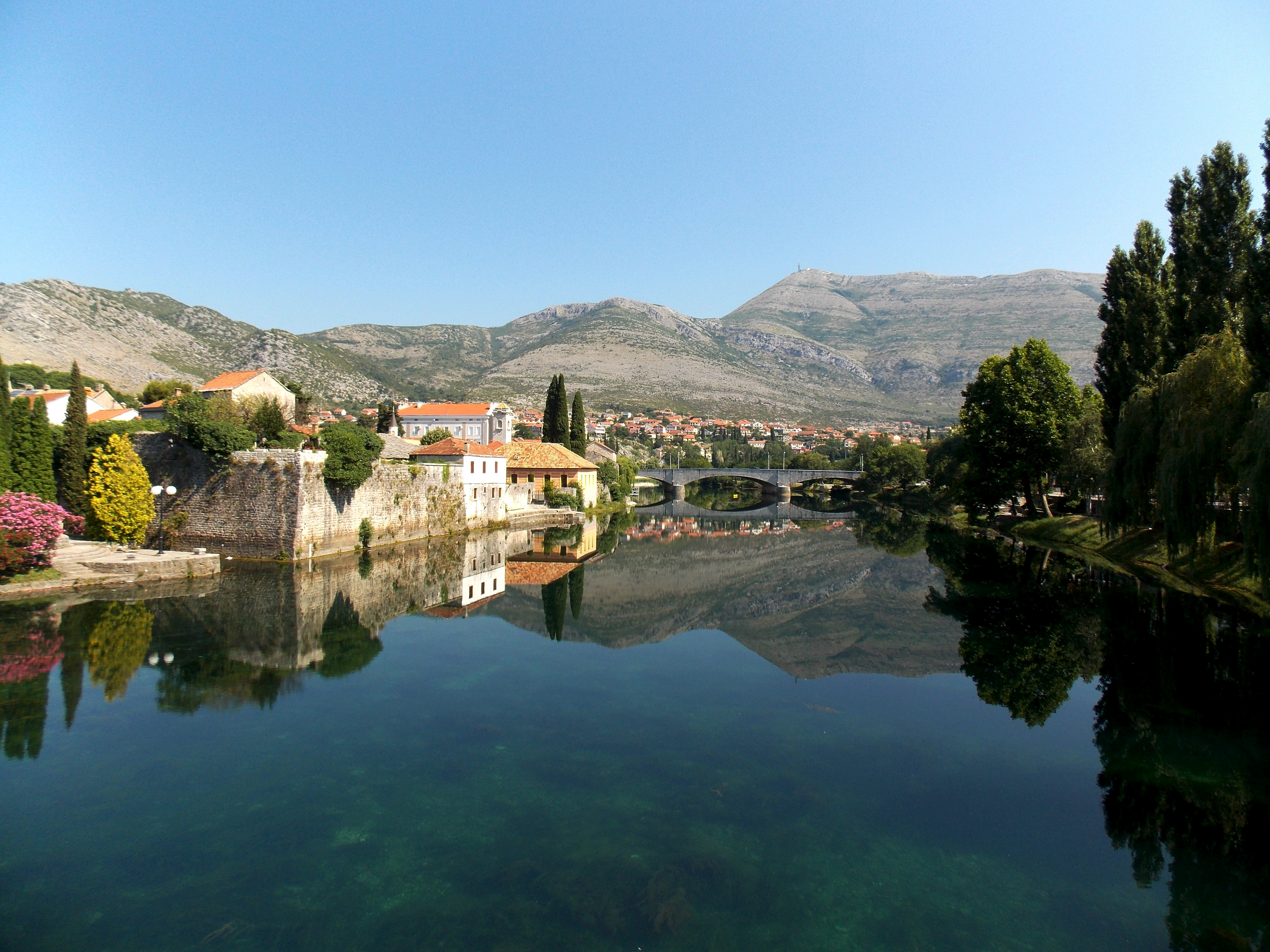
Trebišnjica in Trebinje

The Trebišnjica (Serbian Cyrillic: Требишњица) is a river in Bosnia and Herzegovina, and the right tributary of the Neretva. Before it was utilized for hydro exploitation via various hydrotechnical interventions and systems with different purposes, Trebišnjica used to be a sinking river, rising and sinking through its course before resurfacing at various places from the Neretva river below the Čapljina to the Adriatic coast, and along the coast from the Neretva Delta to Sutorina.

With a total length of 96.5 km (60.0 mi) above the ground, and roughly another 90 km (56 mi) below the surface, the Trebšnjica river is one of the longest sinking rivers in the world with the total of 187 km (116 mi) above and under the ground. In hydrological terms, it represents a sub-basin within the Neretva river basin.

In classical antiquity, the river was known as the Arion.

== Sources ==
The Trebišnjica river originate near town of Bileća. The source of the river is a system of strong karstic wellsprings distributed in two principal aquifer zones, geographically and hydrologically distinct albeit in relatively close proximity to each other. In both zones group of wellsprings raises from the underground, consisting of a number of large, abundant founts each.

The first, at the head of the river and at the outskirts of Bileća town, is the Trebišnjica wellsprings group, consisting of three large wellsprings, with Dejanova Pećina as primer outflow, and two secondary ones, wellspring Oko and Nikšičko Vrelo.

The second zone, Čepelica river spring-group ("Čeplica spring-group") at Ćeplica village, is located 3.25 kilometres (2.02 mi) further down the stream from first group. The Čepelica spring-group consists of two main karst hydrological features, Wellspring Čepo (Vrelo "Čepo") with three main outlets, and group of smaller estavelles (sinkholes) and springs on the left-bank side of the Čeplica river streambed.

Formation of the Bileća Lake has affected the region significantly, both underground as well as at the ground level, with the extent of ecological impact still, after several decades, not being fully assessed. Entire system of the Trebišnjica wellsprings, its both groups, were part of the characteristic Dinaric karst landscape, with significant aesthetic value. However entire area surrounding the Trebišnjica river, its headwaters with sources, Miruška valley, Popovo Polje, many villages and productive land is flooded in 1967 by the Bilećko Lake, formed after construction of the Grnčarevo dam, with the primary purpose of serving as an artificial water reservoir for the Trebinje-1 Hydroelectric Power Station turbines.

== Upper course ==
As it flows in an area of karst (limestone), the Trebišnjica actually represents a very complex system of the above and underground streams. It originates in Bosnia and Herzegovina from two streams from the Lebršnik and Čemerno mountains:

- one stream, the Mušnica, flows from the eastern to the western border of the Gatačko Polje ("Field of Gacko") (from the mountain Lebršnik to Bjelašnica, passes through Lake Klinje and next to the settlements of Avtovac, Gacko, Srđevići, Bašići, Drugovići, Kula, and Branilovići, before it sinks into the karst in the Cerničko Polje ("Field of Cernica", west of Baba Mountain at the village of Cernica under the name of Ključka rijeka (River of Ključ), after a nearby village of Ključ.
- another stream, the Gračanica, flows from the Čemerno mountain also into the Gatačko Polje, next to the villages of Bahori and Gračanica, before it meets the Mušnica near Srđevići. Both streams are characterized by very sharp, almost erratic bends and changes of direction.

The river shortly re-appears in the Fatničko Polje, where the village of Fatnica is largest settlement, under the name of Fatnička rijeka (River of Fatnica), only to sink again after a short flow above the ground.

== Middle course ==
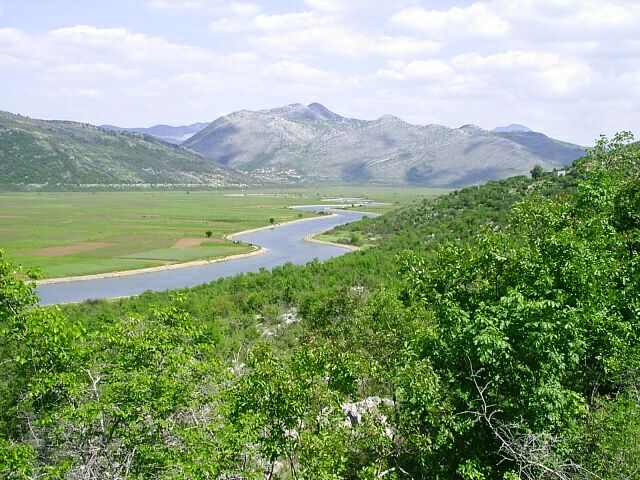
Trebišnjica in Popovo Polje

After a total underground flow of some 30 km (19 mi), the waters of the sinking Fatnička rijeka re-appear as a series of very powerful cave springs near the town of Bileća, which are joined into one river, the Trebišnjica, the most important river in eastern Herzegovina. The river flows to the south, through the depression of Miruša. On the southernmost part of the depression, the river is dammed by the Grancarevo Dam at the village of Gornje Grančarevo and completely flooded upstream by the artificial Lake Bileća. Nearly all of the eastern bank of the lake belongs to Montenegro.

The Trebišnjica turns west between the villages of Donje Grnčarevo and Lastva into the Trebinjsko polje (Field of Trebinje), being dammed again at Gorica, with a small reservoir. The river continues to the west following the southern slopes of Bjelasnica mountain, through the town of Trebinje and villages of Dražin Do, Tvrdoš, Gornja Kočela and Donja Kočela, and enters the largest karst field in the Balkans, Popovo Polje (Priest's Field).

In Popovo Polje, the Trebišnjica used to sink (see Regulation below), right after the Trebinje. In the field, the river turns northwest, next to the villages of Staro Slano, Đedići, Dobromani, Žakovo, Tulje, Sedlari, Grmljani and Zavala, near the Vjetrenica cave, the largest in Bosnia and Herzegovina. The river then turns north, curves between the villages of Dvrsnica, Orašje, Čavaš and Turkovići and in the lower Popovo Polje, near the Croatian border, sinks into the several big sinking holes (most notably, the Doljašnica and Ponikva holes.

== Lower course ==
Ombla catchment area between Bosnia and Croatia feed of Trebišnjica waters Ombla River course and proposed power plant site catchment area, limestones limestones dolomites flysch Adriatic Sea

The waters of the Trebišnjica from the Popovo Polje, re-appear as three separate outflows:

- The powerful spring of Čapljina, in the area of the lower Neretva river, in Hercegovina.
- A series of underwater springs (called vrulje, "boiling water") near the small sea harbor of Slano in Croatia, northwest of Dubrovnik.
- After some 20 km (12 mi) of underground flow, the Trebišnjica re-emerges as the powerful spring in the great cave near Gruž, in the western part of Dubrovnik. The watercourse is called the Ombla River (Umbla; or Dubrovačka rijeka, "River of Dubrovnik"). It is only 30 m (98 ft) long but very wide and powerful (average discharge is 24 m^{3}/s (850 cu ft/s); on maps it appears as a small bay of the Adriatic, in which it flows, north of Dubrovnik). The lower part of the river is flooded by the sea (Croatian: draga), 30 m (98 ft) deep and navigable for 3.7 km (2.3 mi) (unlike the upper course of Trebišnjica which is not navigable at all). Several suburbs of Dubrovnik (Mokošica, Komolac, Rožat, Prijevor, Lozica) are located alongside the river. Water from the river has been used by the Dubrovnik waterworks since 1437.

The total drainage area of the Trebišnjica covers 4,926 km^{2} (1,902 sq mi), of which 600 km^{2} (230 sq mi) is shared with the Neretva drainage area (the spring of Čapljina). The drainage area of the central, longest part of the river covers 2,225 km^{2} (859 sq mi).

== Damming, regulation and importance ==
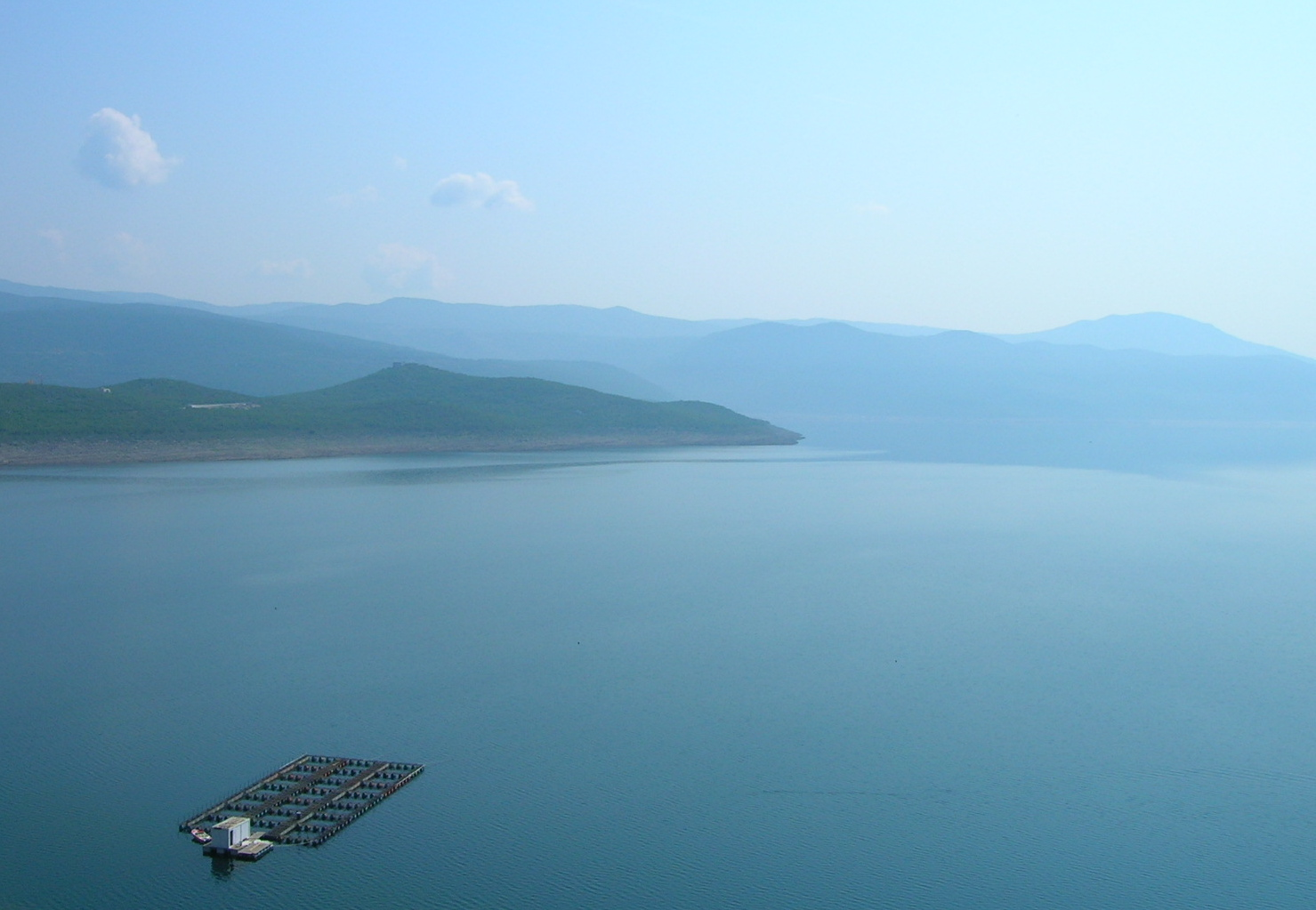
Bileća Lake

As a river that flows in geologically unstable terrain (karst) and with such an interrupted flow, the Trebišnjica contains enormous potential for hydroelectricity production. As a result, regulatory works on the Trebišnjica were arguably the most massive ones in the former Yugoslavia.

- 1965 - The river was dammed at the village of Gorica, creating artificial lake as an auxiliary water basin for the future hydro-electrical power station (HE) Trebinje. The water of the lake is conducted by two parallel, 16 km (9.9 mi)-long, hydro-energetic tunnels into the Croatian village of Plat, on the Adriatic coast, near the Cavtat, where HE Dubrovnik is constructed.
- 1967 - The dam for HE Trebinje (or Grnčarevo) was constructed, creating huge Lake Bileća (or Lake Miruša; area 33 km^{2} (13 sq mi), altitude 400 m (1,300 ft), depth 104 metres (341 ft), volume 1,300,000,000 m^{3} (4.6×10^{10} cu ft)). The old Arslanagić bridge was deconstructed and moved to Trebinje. Together with HE Dubrovnik, two power stations have a power of 422 MW and capacity for production of 2.19 billion kWh yearly.
- 1979 - The HE Čapljina is completed, after an 8 km (5.0 mi) long hydro-energetic tunnel and two reservoirs (with volume of 12,500,000 m^{3} (440,000,000 cu ft)) began operating. The power station has a power of 430 MW (two aggregates of 215 MW) and capacity for 619 million kWh yearly.
- 1979 - To prevent the sinking of the water through the smaller sinking holes in the Popovo Polje, the river bed has been concreted for a length of 67 km (42 mi).

== See also ==
- Bregava
- Buna (Neretva)
- Trebižat
- Krupa
- Hutovo Blato

== Sources ==
- Mala Prosvetina Enciklopedija, Third edition (1985); Prosveta; ISBN 86-07-00001-2
- Jovan Đ. Marković (1990): Enciklopedijski geografski leksikon Jugoslavije; Svjetlost-Sarajevo; ISBN 86-01-02651-6
