= Bilećko Lake =

Reservoirs in Bileća, Bosnia and Herzegovina

Bileća Lake
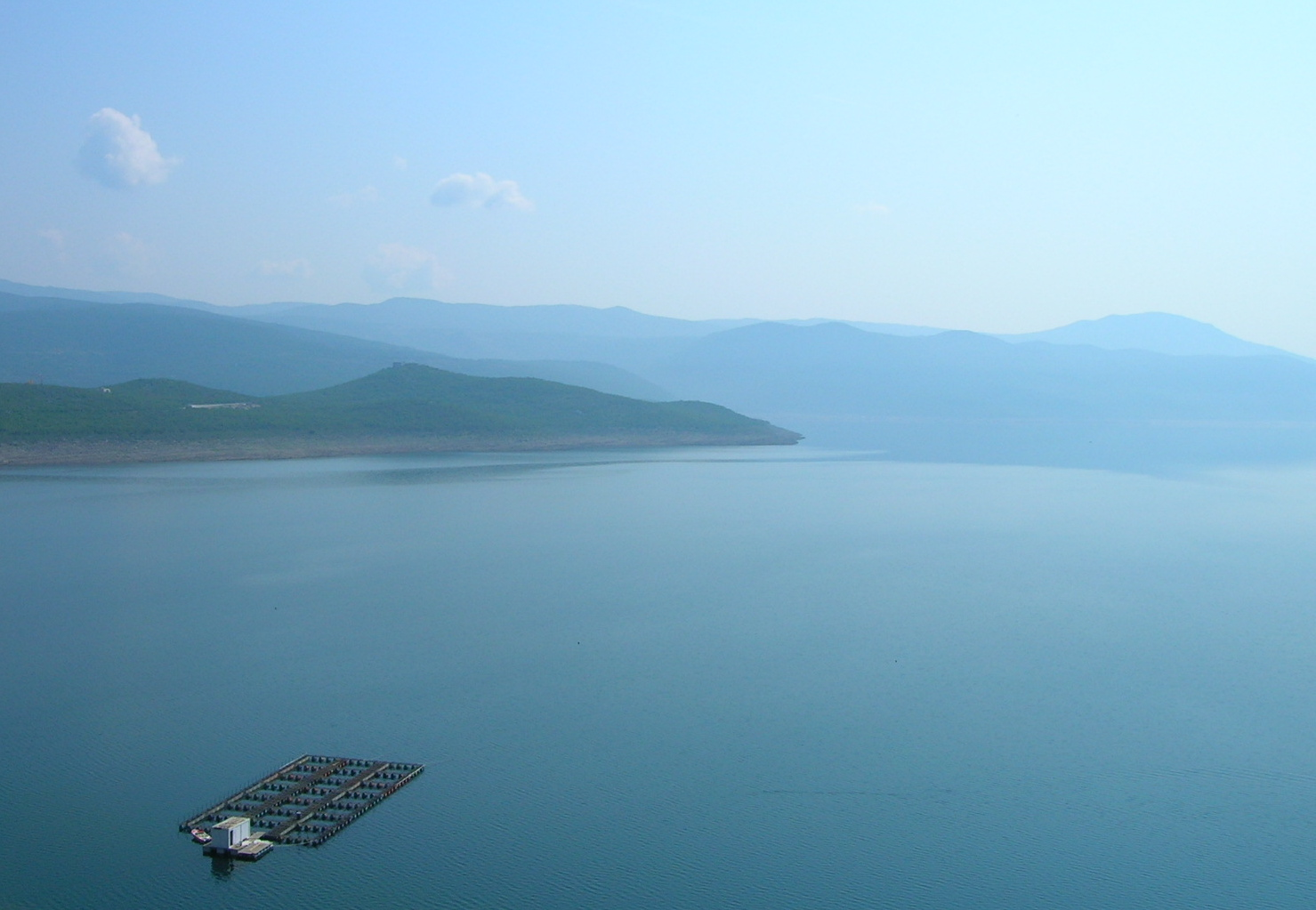
- View of the lake

- Location within Bosnia and Herzegovina
- Interactive map of Bileća Lake
- Location: Bileća, Bosnia and Herzegovina
- Coordinates: 42°49′31″N 18°26′17″E
- Type: artificial reservoir
- Basin countries: Bosnia and Herzegovina
- Max. length: 18 km (11 mi)
- Max. width: 4 km (2.5 mi)
- Surface area: 33 km^{2} (13 sq mi)
- Max. depth: 104 m (341 ft)
- Surface elevation: 400 m (1,300 ft)

Bileća Lake (Serbian: Билећко jезеро, romanized: Bilećko jezero) is an artificial lake located in the municipality of Bileća, in the entity of Republika Srpska, Bosnia and Herzegovina, its length forming part of the Montenegrin border thus a small part being within Montenegro. The manmade lake was created by building the Grančarevo Dam an arch dam across the Trebišnjica River, which was built in 1968. It lies in the upper and central part of Trebsinjica valley, 17 km from Trebinje town and is one of the largest lakes in Bosnia and Herzegovina.

== Geography ==
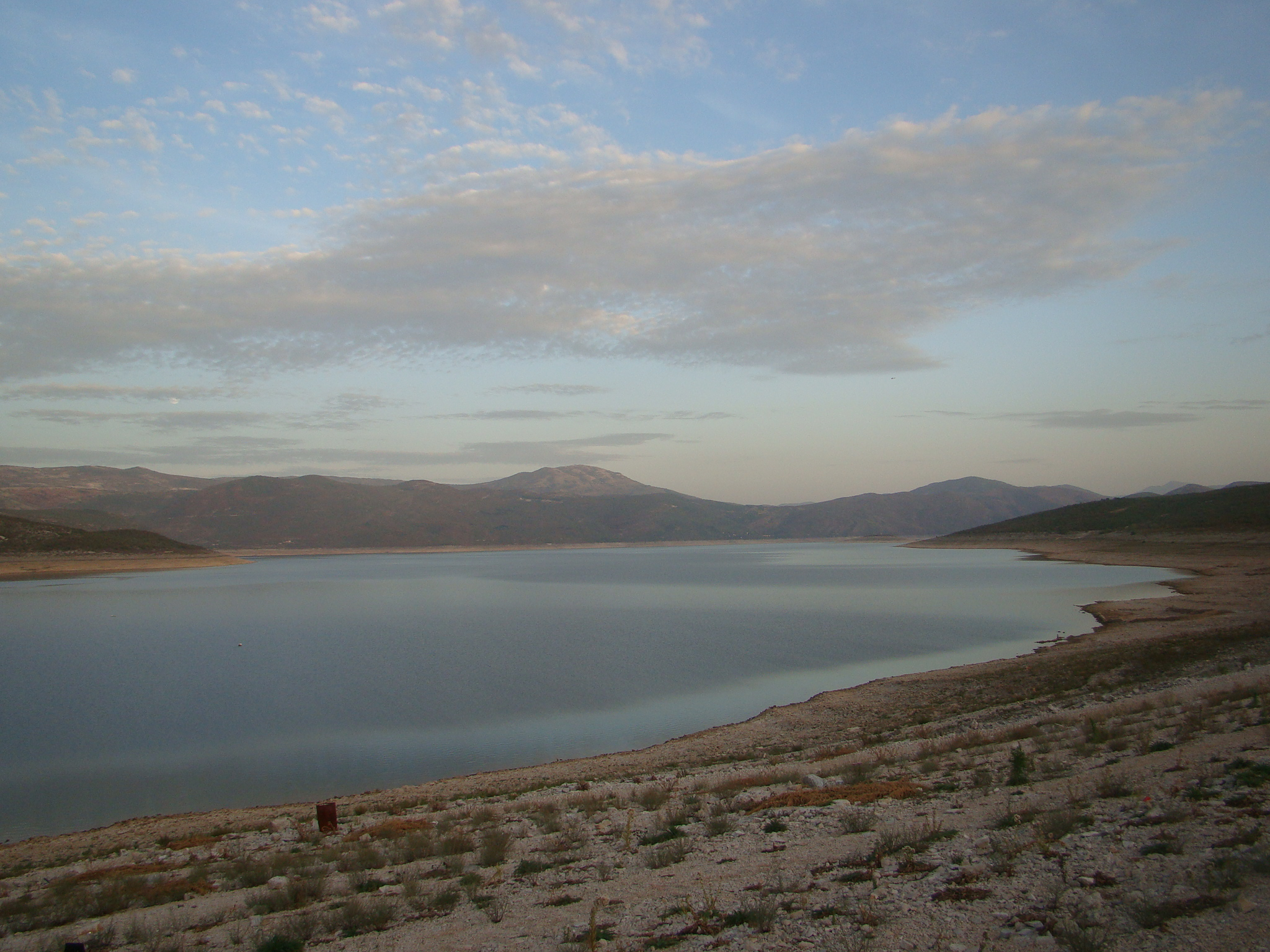
Bileća Lake

Bileća Lake is a large man made lake on the Trebišnjica River, which was created in 1968. This is the only source of surface water in an area which is subject to extreme weather conditions in winter and also in summer. Čepelica is its small tributary in Bileća Rudine and is stated to be the best known subterranean river in Bosnia and Herzegovina. It lies in the Upper and central part of Trebsinjica valley 17 km from Trebinje is one of the largest lakes in the country.

The landscape of the district where the lake is situated consists of limestone mountains with bare karst formations

== See also ==
- List of lakes in Bosnia and Herzegovina
