= Mokošica =

Mokošica Nova Mokošica
- Suburbs
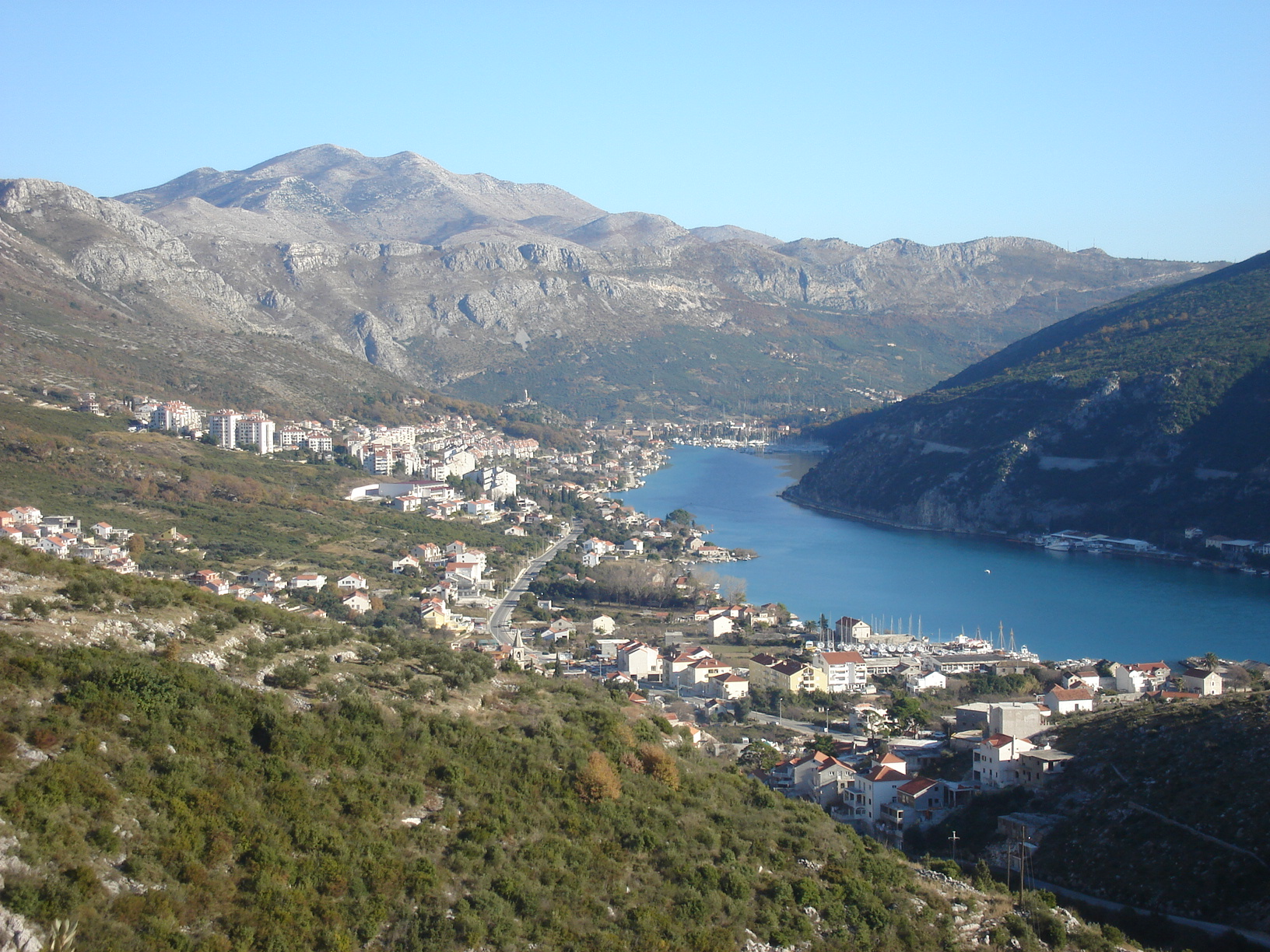

- Location within Croatia
- Coordinates: 42°40′34″N 18°05′42″E
- Country: Croatia
- County: Dubrovnik-Neretva
- Municipality: Dubrovnik

Area
  - Total: 1.6 km^{2} (0.62 sq mi)
- Elevation: 0 m (0 ft)

Population (2021)
  - Total: 2,193
  - Density: 1,400/km^{2} (3,500/sq mi)
- Time zone: UTC+1 (CET)
  - Summer (DST): UTC+2 (CEST)
- Postal code: 20236
- Area code: 020
- Licence plate: DU

Mokošica is a settlement in the city of Dubrovnik in Croatia. As a suburb, it consists of the old Mokošica and the new Mokošica (Nova Mokošica).

== Name ==
Mokošica was named after Mokosh, the goddess of fertility and protector of women in Slavic mythology.

== Geographical location ==
Mokošica is the first major western suburban town of Dubrovnik (7 km from Dubrovnik). It is located just above the Adriatic Highway which leads to Split. From the north and east it is surrounded by the high mountains of the Dalmatian coast. Towards the north lie the slopes of Golubov Kamen Hill.

== History ==
From the 16th century onwards Mokošica was the summer location for the citizens of Dubrovnik (Houses of Bona, Zuzorić, Ragnina and Giorgi). The most important building is Gozze-Giorgi (Sabino Giorgi) villa where, in 1814, the council met for the last time to restore the Republic of Ragusa. Nearby, there is Mokošica Villa Zamagna with a small chapel as well as ruins of a medieval church St. Pancras.

During the war in Croatia, around November 21, 1991, New and Old Mokošica were invaded and occupied by the Yugoslav People's Army (JNA), Serbian and Montenegrin armies.

Even though the Yugoslav forces withdrew from both Mokošicas on May 26, 1992, bombing still continued throughout summer 1992 and again in mid-August 1995 following the fall of the Serbian Krajina.

New Mokošica recorded less destruction than the old town. It is believed that this was the case because members of guerrilla units were stationed in Old Mokošica.

== Demographics ==
According to the 2021 census, its population was 2,193. It is considered one of the most densely populated urban districts in Croatia. The vast majority of the population are Croats, with small percentages of Serbs and Bosniaks.

== Economy ==
The vast majority of employees in Mokošica work in Dubrovnik. Main branches of economy in Mokošica are tourism, shipbuilding and fishing. There are plans to construct a large shopping centre and consequently the development of trade.

In the immediate vicinity of Komolac there is a marina. ACI Marina Dubrovnik in Komolac is the holder of a blue flag, and is located near the source of the river Ombla. The marina is completely protected from storm waves and the sea. It is considered one of the safest marinas in the world.

=== Transportation ===
New Mokošica is connected to Dubrovnik by the Adriatic highway. The 7 kilometre journey is covered frequently by bus lines 1A and 1B of the transportation company Libertas.
