= Primorje =

Primorje may refer to:

- Croatian Littoral (Hrvatsko primorje), a Croatian region
- Montenegrin Littoral (Crnogorsko primorje), a Montenegrin region
- Primorje (medieval župa), 14th-century Bosnian possession near Dubrovnik
- Bosansko Primorje (Bosnian Littoral), medieval region between the Neretva Delta and the Rijeka Dubrovačka
- Primorje EB, a Croatian water polo club
- NK Primorje, a Slovenian football club
- Dubrovačko Primorje, a Croatian municipality
- Primorje or Pomorje, a medieval South Slavic name for littoral regions
- Primorje, colloquial for Littoral Banovina (Primorska banovina) from 1929 to 1939
- Primorje, colloquial for Primorsky Krai, Russia

== See also ==
- Primorye
- Primorye, Kaliningrad Oblast
- Slovene Littoral (Primorska)
