= Church of the Nativity of the Theotokos, Mostar =

Church in Mostar, Bosnia and Herzegovina

Church of the Nativity of the Theotokos
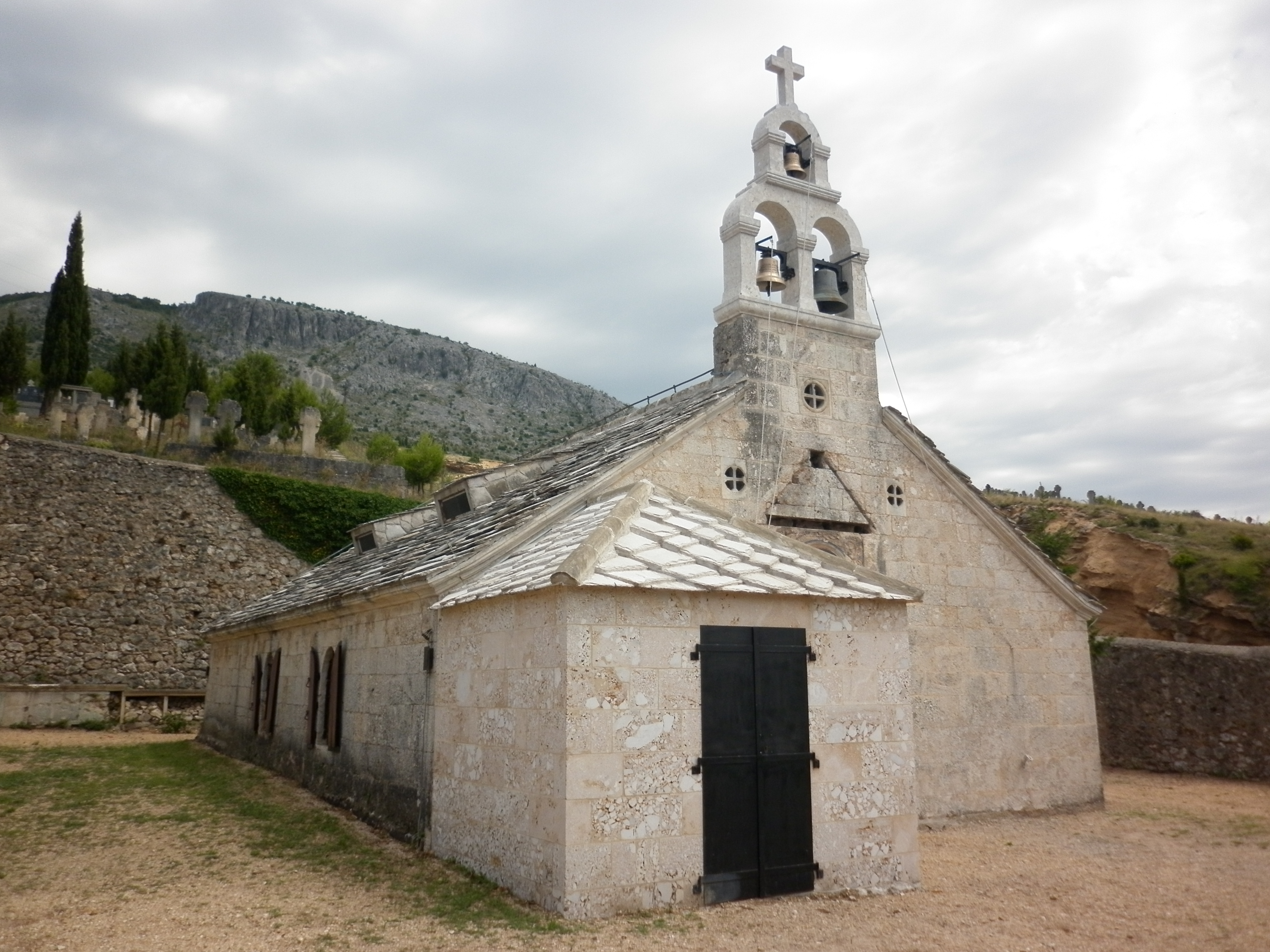
- Church of the Nativity of the Theotokos
- Church of the Nativity of the Theotokos
- 43°20′20″N 17°49′12″E
- Location: Mostar
- Country: Bosnia and Herzegovina
- Denomination: Serbian Orthodox Church

History
- Status: Church
- Dedication: Nativity of the Theotokos

Architecture
- Functional status: Active

Administration
- Diocese: Eparchy of Zachlumia, Herzegovina, and the Littoral

The Church of the Nativity of the Theotokos (Serbian: Црква рођења Пресвете Богородице, romanized: Crkva rođenja Presvete Bogorodice), also known as the Old Orthodox Church, is Eastern Orthodox church in Mostar, Bosnia and Herzegovina. It is under jurisdiction of Eparchy of Zachlumia, Herzegovina, and the Littoral of the Serbian Orthodox Church.

== History ==
The church was built in 15th century. The building was heavily damaged during the Bosnian War in 1992 when it was mined and set on fire. During the war, two valuable icons were saved by a local Bosniak family Jašarević. These icons, of the Virgin Mary and Saint George, were returned to the Serbian Orthodox Church in Mostar in 2022. The building is listed as a national monuments in Bosnia and Herzegovina. On August 12, 2022, the church was subjected to a vandalism and theft incident. Unknown perpetrators broke into the church desecrated the altar, scattered church items, and stole money from donation boxes.

== See also ==
- Eparchy of Zachlumia, Herzegovina, and the Littoral
- Holy Trinity Cathedral
- Žitomislić Monastery
- Serbs of Mostar
