= Serbs of Mostar =

Traditional ethnic community in Mostar, Bosnia and Herzegovina

The Serbs of Mostar are one of traditional ethnic communities living in Mostar, city in Bosnia and Herzegovina.

== History ==
=== 18th and 19th centuries ===
In the 18th and 19th centuries, many Serbs from Mostar were merchants and traders. They formed business communities in Vienna, Trieste, Novi Sad, in the Republic of Venice, as well as in the Republic of Ragusa (Dubrovnik), Zara (Zadar) and other towns. Their accumulated wealth raised their position in society and sponsored a vibrant cultural and artistic bloom. In 1863, the construction of a large new church was begun, the Holy Trinity Cathedral. It was initially supervised by the little-known Spasoje Vulić, but was completed by Andrey Damyanov (who also designed of the Cathedral of the Nativity of the Theotokos in Sarajevo, constructed in a similar style around the same time). The works were financed locally, as well as by wealthy Serbs from the Austrian Empire and the Ottoman Sultan Abdülaziz (in the amount of 25,000 groschen).

=== World War II ===
Mostar was part of the Nazi puppet state Independent State of Croatia, along with the rest of Bosnia and Herzegovina. The Ustasha fascist regime led by Ante Pavelić view of Serbs in a way akin to the Nazi German view of Jews. The persecution of the town's Serbs began in the summer of 1941. The events of 24–28 June 1941 are known by Serbs as the "Vidovdan Massacre" (Vidovdanski pokolj), as 28 June is Vidovdan in the Serbian Orthodox calendar. Mass arrests of town's Serbs by the Ustashas began on the afternoon of 24 June 1941. The most prominent Serb traders, teachers, and priests of the Serbian Orthodox Church were among those arrested, as well as workers and farmers, some 450 in total from 24 to 26 June 1941. Some were killed on the night following the beginning of the arrests, while some were thrown into cave-pits and others were killed on the banks of the Neretva river. Almost thirty of Mostar's Serb citizens were thrown into a cave-pit above the village of Čitluk, about 10 km from the town. Many others - at least 160 people - were stabbed to death or beaten to death with large rocks, mallets and metal bars. The entire brotherhood of Žitomislić monastery was arrested by the Ustasha on 27 June 1941, and driven to the village of Blizanci, where they were tortured and killed, some being thrown alive into the Vidonja cave-pit. Serbs in the villages surrounding Mostar were also targeted and murdered. In the following months, many Serbs from Mostar and the surrounding area were transported to Ustasha concentration camps, mainly Jasenovac, while many others fled to Nazi-occupied Serbia. Around 8,000 Serbs lived in Mostar before the massacres started on 24 June 1941, and by the end of August only around 850 remained.

=== Bosnian War ===
During the Bosnian War (1992–1995), Mostar’s Serb population, which had numbered around 20,000 before the conflict, faced intense pressure after Croat forces took control of the city in mid-1992 and expelled or forced most Serbs to flee. Many Serb civilians were detained in makeshift camps such as the Heliodrom and the Faculty of Mechanical Engineering, and numerous Serb homes, businesses, and cultural sites (including the Cathedral of the Holy Trinity) were destroyed or heavily damaged. By the time the Croat–Bosniak conflict erupted in 1993, the once-significant Serb community in Mostar had been almost entirely displaced, and only a tiny fraction returned after the war.

== Demographics ==
According to data from the 2013 census, number of ethnic Serbs in Mostar stood at 4,421, constituting 4.2% of city's population. Ethnic Serbs constituted almost a fifth of Mostar's population prior the Bosnian War during which a majority of them were forced out, as part of an extensive ethnic cleansing campaign. With the city's post-war partition into Croat and Bosniak sections, very few Serbs have returned.

== Heritage ==
Mostar is the seat of the Eparchy of Zachlumia, Herzegovina, and the Littoral of the Serbian Orthodox Church. There are two Serbian Orthodox churches in the city: the Church of the Nativity of the Theotokos, also known as the "Old Orthodox Church", dating back to the 15th century, and the Holy Trinity Cathedral, also known as the "Cathedral Church", built in the 1870s. During the Bosnian War, the Holy Trinity Cathedral was demolished by the Croatian forces. The reconstruction of the Holy Trinity Cathedral began in 2010 through community efforts and international donations and was completed by the 2024. This restoration, which includes reviving intricate frescoes, the gilded iconostasis, and the church's historic bell tower, symbolizes interethnic unity in the divided city, though the interior is not yet ready for full services. Žitomislić Monastery, built in early 16th century and dedicated to the Annunciation, is located near Mostar.

== Gallery ==
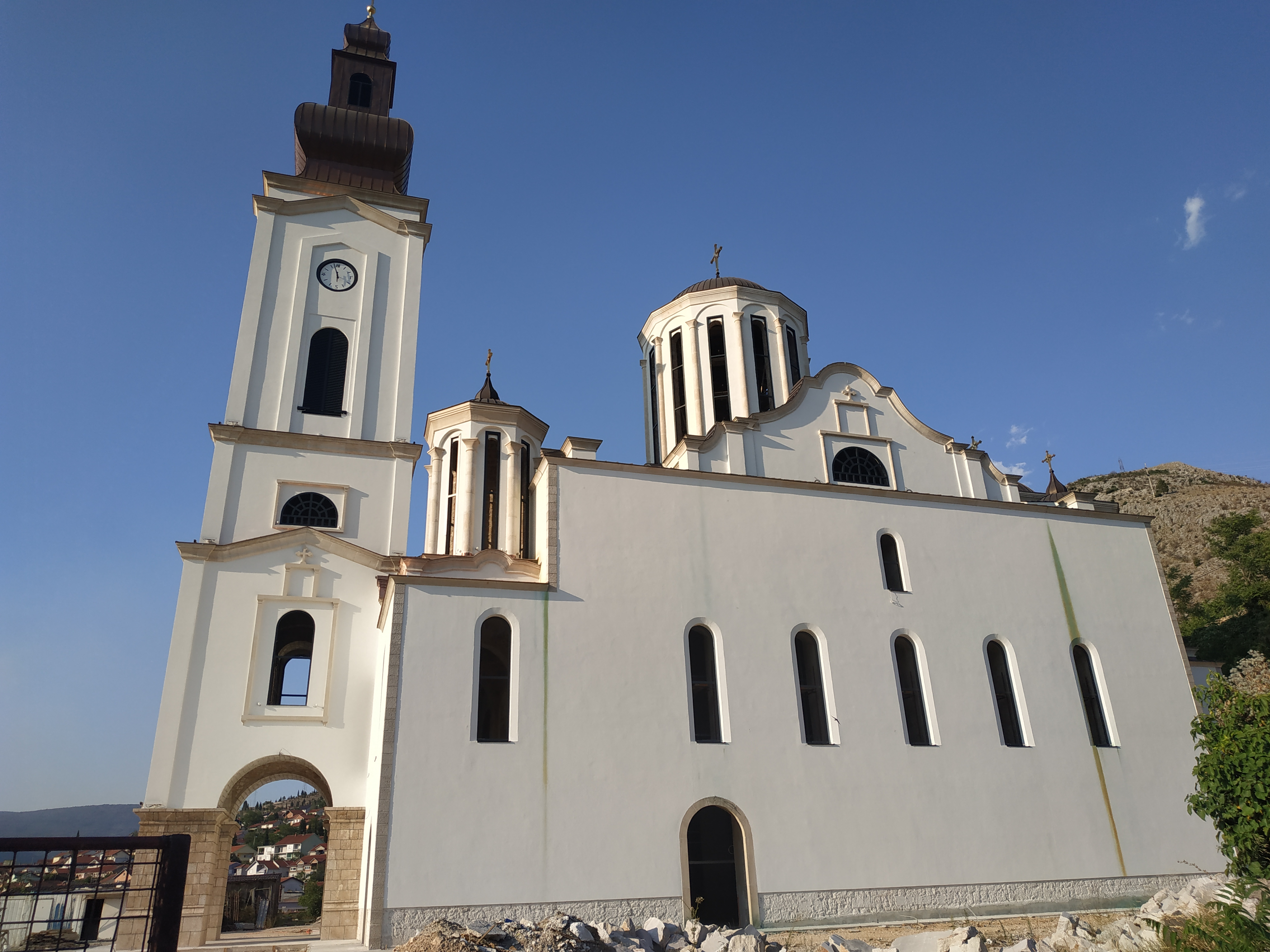
Holy Trinity Cathedral

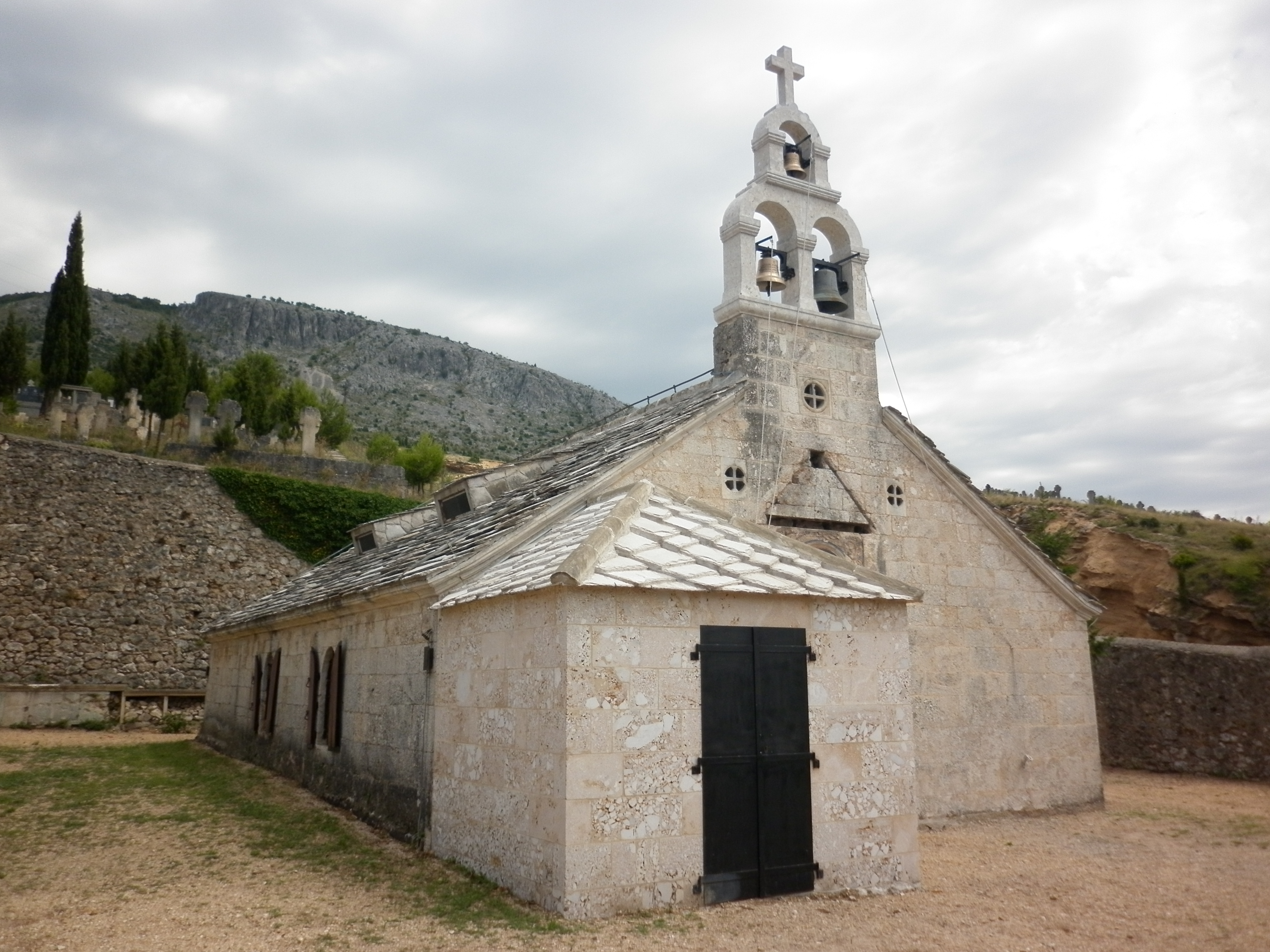
Church of the Nativity of the Theotokos

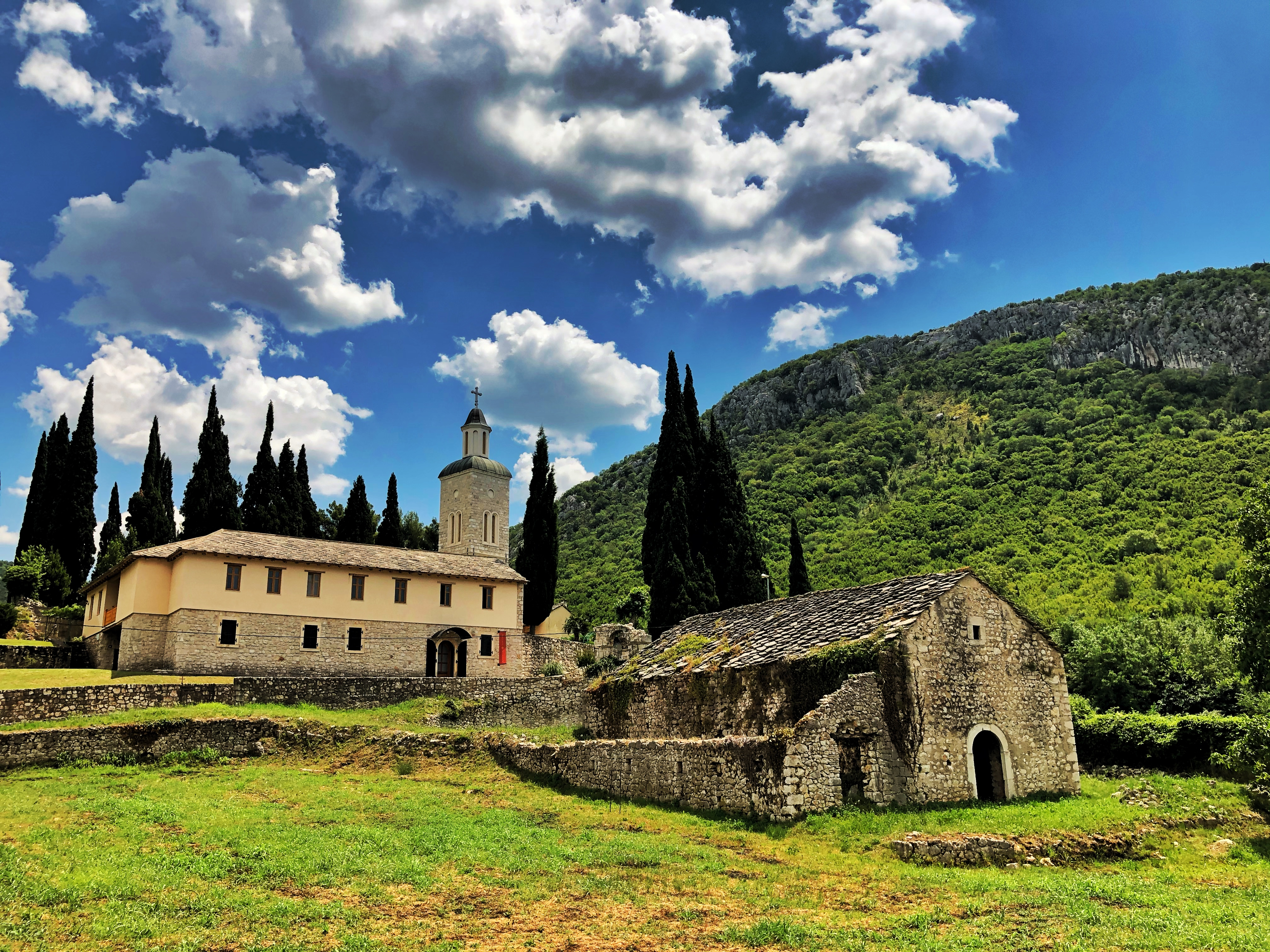
Žitomislić Monastery

== Notable people ==
- Dušan Bajević – football player and manager
- Sergej Barbarez – football player and manager
- Svetozar Ćorović – historian
- Vladimir Ćorović – historian
- Radomir Damnjanović Damnjan – painter
- Osman Đikić – poet
- Borislav Džaković – basketball coach
- Veselin Gatalo – poet
- Nemanja Gordić – basketball player
- Svetislav Mandić – historian, poet, and painter
- Gordan Mihić – playwright
- Sima Milutinović – aeronautical engineer
- Veselin Misita – military officer
- Željko Samardžić – singer
- Aleksa Šantić – poet
- Dragiša Vučinić – basketball player
- Tibor Živković – historian

== See also ==
- Serbs of Bosnia and Herzegovina
- Serbs of Sarajevo
- Eparchy of Zachlumia, Herzegovina, and the Littoral
