= Holy Trinity Cathedral, Mostar =

Serbian Orthodox cathedral in Mostar, Bosnia and Herzegovina

Holy Trinity Cathedral
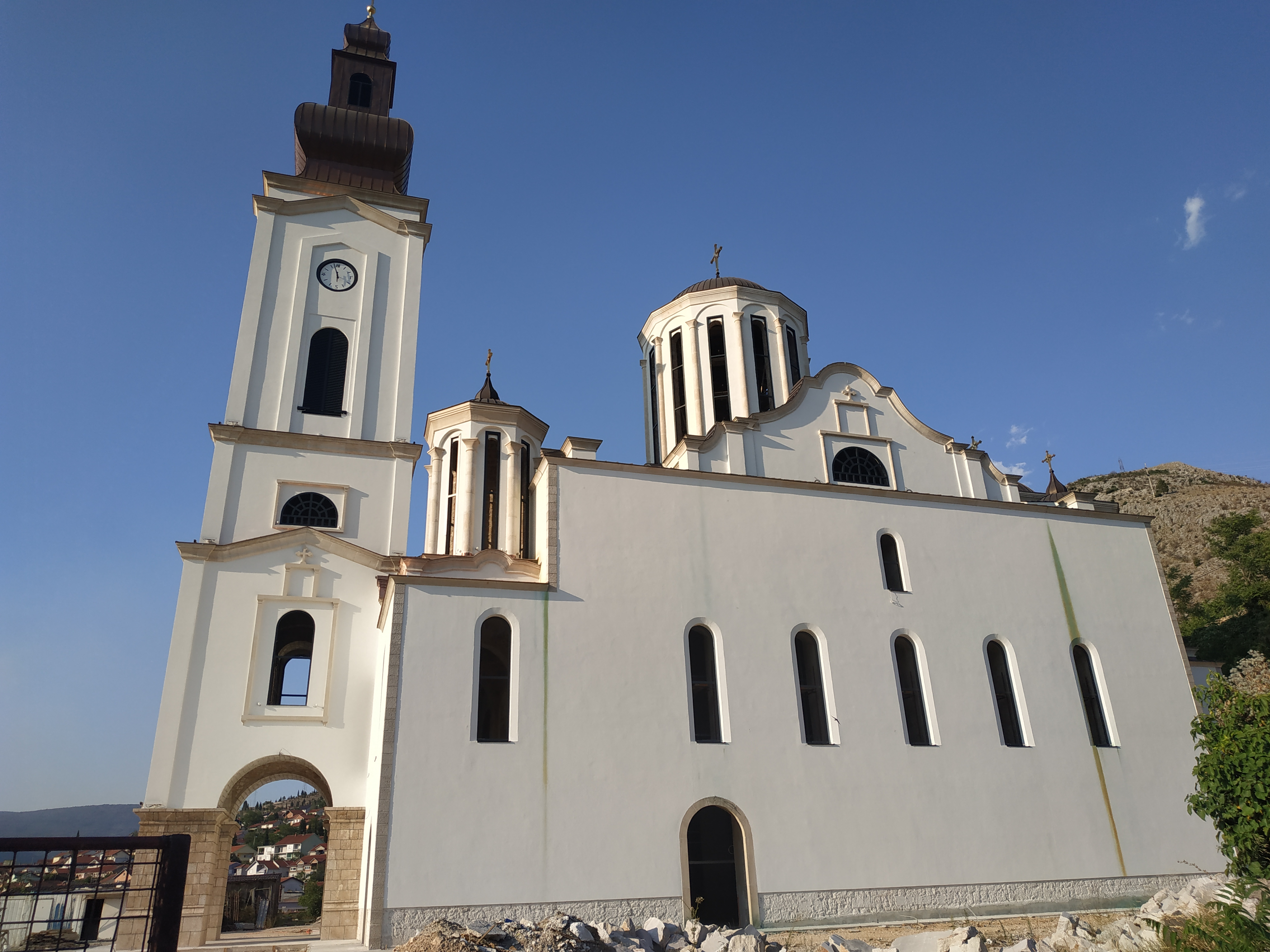
- Holy Trinity Cathedral, pictured in 2022

Religion
- Affiliation: Serbian Orthodox Church
- Year consecrated: 1878

Location
- Location: Mostar
- Country: Bosnia and Herzegovina
- Interactive map of Holy Trinity Cathedral
- Coordinates: 43°20′58″N 17°48′51″E

Architecture
- Architect: Andrey Damyanov
- Groundbreaking: 1863
- Completed: 1873
- Demolished: 1992

The Holy Trinity Cathedral (Serbian: Саборнa црква Свете Тројице, romanized: Saborna crkva Svete Trojice) is an Eastern Orthodox church located in Mostar, Bosnia and Herzegovina. It is under jurisdiction of the Eparchy of Zachlumia, Herzegovina, and the Littoral of the Serbian Orthodox Church and served as its cathedral church from 1873 until its destruction during the Bosnian War in 1992. It has been under reconstruction since 2011.

== History ==
The church was the work of the prominent architect Andrey Damyanov and was built between 1863 and 1873.

== Gallery ==
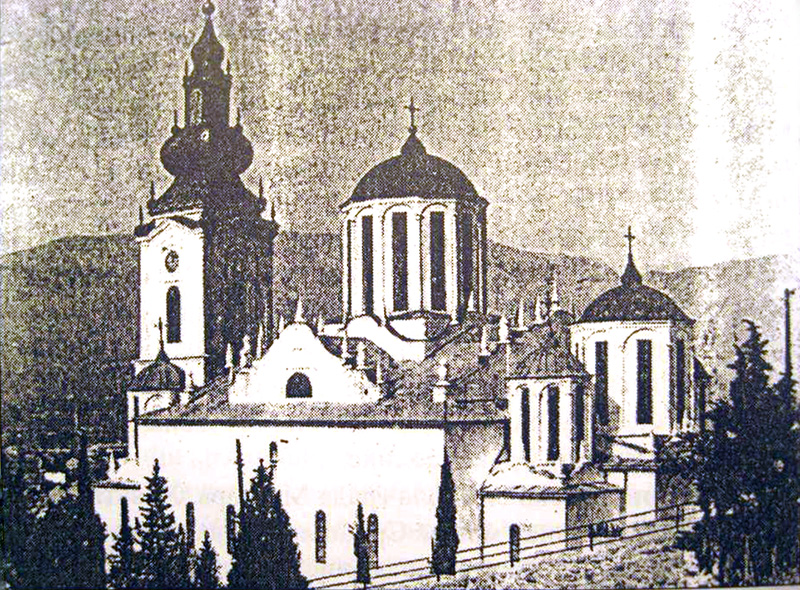
Holy Trinity Cathedral, early 20th century

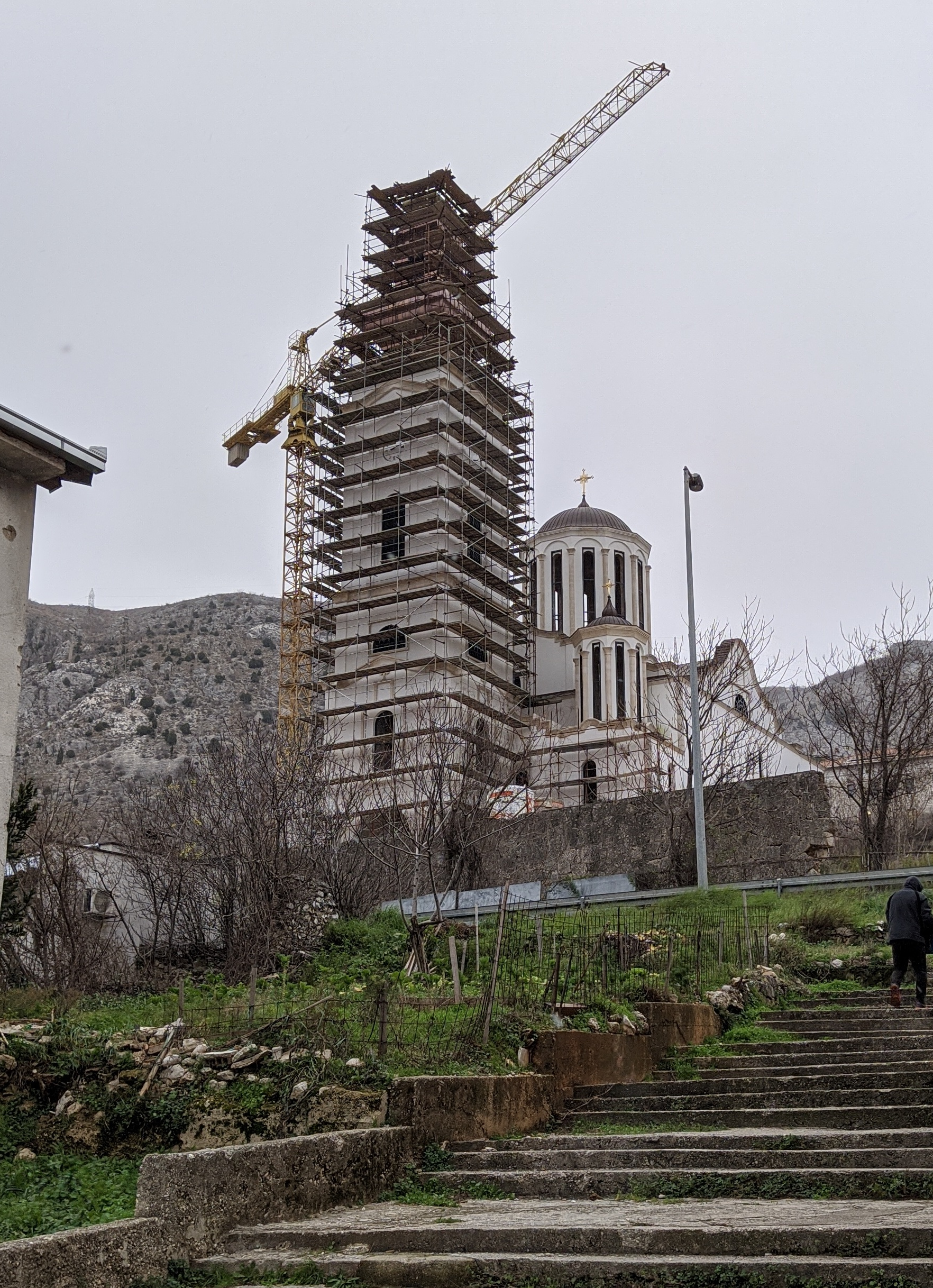
Holy Trinity Cathedral under reconstruction, 2021

== See also ==
- Eparchy of Zachlumia, Herzegovina, and the Littoral
- Church of the Nativity of the Theotokos, Mostar
- Žitomislić Monastery
- Serbs of Mostar
