= Primorje (medieval župa) =

Primorje was a župa in Hum zemlja, encompassing most of Bosansko Primorje, with the center in Slano. The župa was a part of the Bosnian medieval state from 1326 to 1399. The župa had a northwestern border with the župa of Žaba, the northeastern border with župa Popovo, southeast with Dubrovnik, in the southwest it is the Adriatic Sea and Stonska prevlaka (Isthmus of Ston). Recognizable features are Rijeka Dubrovačka, Zaton, Gruž, Islands (Elifati) and Slansko primorje. At the time of Bosnian rule, the most important magnates in this area were the Sanković family until their fall in 1404.

In 1399, King Ostoja sold the coast from Kuril to Ston (Serbo-Croatian: od Kurila deri do Stona) to the people of Dubrovnik, and thus also the župa of Primorje. Later, the king of Ostoja fought a war with Dubrovnik in 1403-1404 because of this, but he could not recover what he had ceded. This was confirmed by the peace of Bosnia and Dubrovnik in 1405. However, the village of Lisac in the župa Primorje remained a controversial issue for the foreseeable future, which was raised by the Bosnian Duke Sandalj.

== Bibliography ==
- Anđelić, Pavao (1982). "Srednjovjekovna župa Primorje u Humskoj zemlji". Tribunia. 6. Trebinje: 27–40.
- Anđelić, Pavao (1983). Srednjovjekovne župe. Teritorijalni sistem lokalne uprave u ranijim stoljećima srednjeg vijeka na području nekadašnje Humske zemlje (Naučnoistraživački projekat ed.). Zemaljski muzej BiH.
- Anđelić, Pavao; Sivrić, Marijan; Anđelić, Tomislav (1999). Srednjovjekovne Humske župe. Ziral. p. 296. ISBN 978-953-6364-37-4.
