= Ombla =

River in Croatia

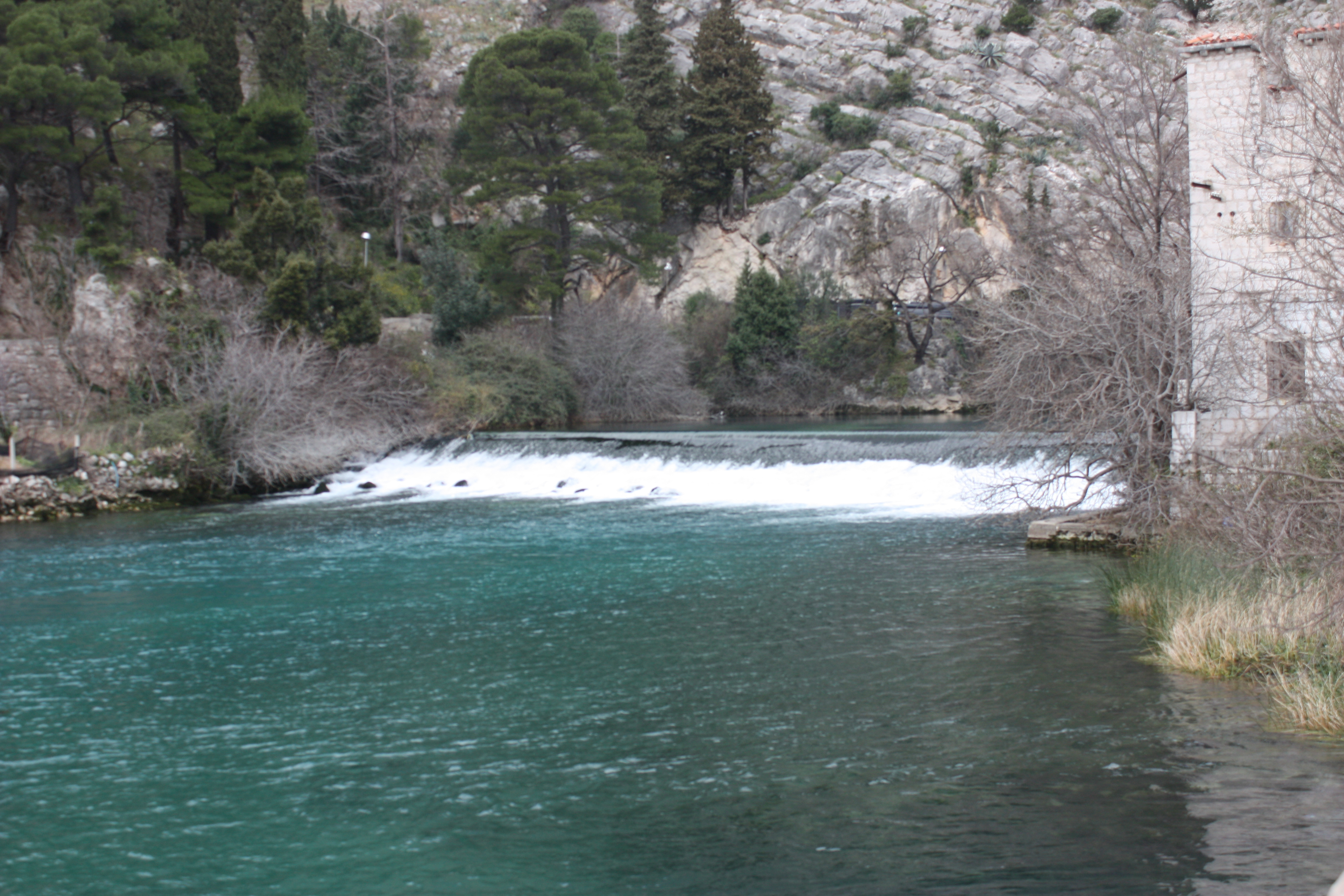
- The Ombla at Komolac, Croatia

- Ombla catchment area: Ombla River course and proposed power plant site catchment area, limestones limestones dolomites flysch Adriatic Sea; Inset map: location of the area within Croatia and Bosnia-Herzegovina

Location
- Country: Croatia
- Region: Dalmatia
- District: Dubrovnik-Neretva County

Physical characteristics
- Source: Golubov Kamen
  - location: Komolac, Croatia
  - coordinates: 42°40′33″N 18°8′12″E
  - elevation: 2.38 m (7 ft 10 in)
- Mouth: Adriatic Sea
  - location: Komolac, Croatia
  - coordinates: 42°40′32″N 18°8′12″E
  - elevation: 0 m (0 ft)
- Length: 0.03 km (0.019 mi)
- Basin size: 600 km^{2} (230 sq mi)
- Discharge
  - location: source
  - average: 24.1 m^{3}/s (850 cu ft/s)
  - minimum: 3.96 m^{3}/s (140 cu ft/s)
  - maximum: 104 m^{3}/s (3,700 cu ft/s)

The Ombla is a short river in Croatia, northeast of Dubrovnik. Its course is approximately 30 metres (98 feet) long, and it empties into Rijeka Dubrovačka, a part of the Adriatic Sea, near Komolac in Dubrovnik-Neretva County. Rijeka Dubrovačka is a ria, a flooded river valley formed through changes in sea surface elevation on a geologic time scale. The river rises as a karst spring fed by groundwater replenished by Trebišnjica, which is an influent stream flowing in Popovo Polje, in the immediate hinterland of the Ombla. The elevation difference between the river's source and its mouth is just over 2 metres (6 feet 7 inches). The average discharge of the river is 24.1 cubic metres (850 cubic feet) per second. The drainage basin of the Ombla encompasses 600 square kilometres (230 square miles) and, besides the short surface course, includes only groundwater flow.

The Ombla is used as a source of drinking water for Dubrovnik's water supply network, and construction of a hydroelectric power plant has been planned for the past two decades. As of 2012, the plans entail construction of a subsurface reservoir and a 68 megawatt power plant. The plan sparked controversy amid doubts raised with respect to environmental protection and biodiversity management, technical and financial feasibility, and procedural problems related to the project. A particular concern expressed was that the underground reservoir might trigger earthquakes.

== Source and course ==
The course of the Ombla River is located in the Dubrovnik-Neretva County, northeast of the city of Dubrovnik in the southernmost part of the mainland of Croatia. The entire ria with its surroundings bears the name, Rijeka Dubrovačka (lit. Dubrovnik's River), and encompasses several villages clustered near the Ombla that are home to 12,000 people. The name is also applied to an estuary of the Ombla—a ria enclosed by steep slopes of 600-metre (2,000 ft) high hills, forming a 5-kilometre (3.1-mile) long, 200-to-400-metre (660 to 1,310 ft) wide and 26-metre (85-foot) deep embayment of the Adriatic Sea. The Ombla rises at the foot of the 422-metre (1,385 ft) Golubov Kamen massif, a landform that straddles the border between Croatia and Bosnia-Herzegovina.

The river rises in an 80-by-40-metre (260 by 130 ft) cave whose roof has an 8-metre (26 ft) clearance above the surface of the water. The primary source is located at an elevation of 15 metres (49 feet) below sea level, and the secondary sources are found at 2.5 metres (8 feet 2 inches) above sea level (a.s.l.). The spring is the largest karst spring in Croatia, and one of the largest ones in the Dinarides. The surface of the water in the cave is 2.38 metres (7 feet 10 inches) a.s.l. The watercourse flows for approximately 30 metres (98 feet) before reaching a weir across which the Ombla discharges into the Adriatic Sea, leading to claims that the Ombla is the shortest river in the world.

== Drainage basin ==
The drainage basin of the Ombla is estimated to cover an area of at least 600 square kilometres (230 square miles), and up to 900 square kilometres (350 square miles) between the Adriatic Sea coast in the area of Dubrovnik and Popovo Polje. Other than the short surface course of the river, the drainage basin includes groundwater only. The exact boundaries of the drainage basin vary depending on prevailing hydrological conditions determining groundwater seepage and flow. The area comprises 176 settlements and 50,000 inhabitants.

The area exhibits karst morphology, with bedrock largely consisting of limestones and comparatively small areas of dolomites and Quaternary sediments. Eocene flysch forms the southwest boundary of the catchment area, towards which the catchment basin drains and where the Ombla rises. The rocks were formed as a thick series of carbonate sediments were deposited between the Norian and Late Cretaceous as the Adriatic Carbonate Platform, up to 8,000 metres (26,000 ft) deep. In the Eocene and early Oligocene, the Adriatic Plate moved north and north-east, contributing to the Alpine orogeny via the tectonic uplift of the Dinarides. The basin's karst topography developed from the carbonate platform's exposure to weathering. Karstification largely began after the Dinarides' final uplift in the Oligocene and the Miocene, when the carbonates were exposed to atmospheric effects; this extended to the level of 120 metres (390 feet) below the present sea level, exposed during the Last Glacial Maximum. Some karst formations were created during earlier sea level drops, most notably the Messinian salinity crisis. The geological structure of the area indicates recent tectonic activity in the catchment, with a fault running between Hum and the Ombla. A recent strong earthquake in the wider region was the 1979 Montenegro earthquake, measuring 7.0 on the Richter scale. The only strong historical earthquake in the immediate area was the 1667 Dubrovnik earthquake, which was followed by a tsunami.

The hydrological regime of the basin and Popovo Polje is determined by the flow of the Trebišnjica—a losing stream disappearing underground in the polje. The groundwater is distributed to a number of springs. Some of them are headwaters of watercourses discharging into the Neretva River to the northwest of the polje, or appearing as vruljas (submarine springs) or as headwaters of the Ombla river. Flow rate of the Ombla River, measured at the Komolac water intake plant, ranges from 3.96 to 104 cubic metres (140 to 3,673 cubic feet) per second, averaging 24.1 cubic metres (850 cubic feet) per second. The average has dropped by about 10 cubic metres (350 cubic feet) per second since completion of Trebišnjica Hydroelectric Power Plant and the concreting of the Trebišnjica's river bed. On the other hand, the minimum discharge was not affected by the river engineering works.

The catchment basin area straddles boundary of two climate zones—the Mediterranean climate zone in areas at elevations up to 400 metres (1,300 feet) a.s.l, and the continental climate zone in other parts of the basin. Average annual precipitation varies depending on the climate zones: 1,238 millimetres (48.7 inches) in Dubrovnik, at the coast, and 2,037 millimetres (80.2 inches) in Hum, in Popovo Polje.

== Economy ==
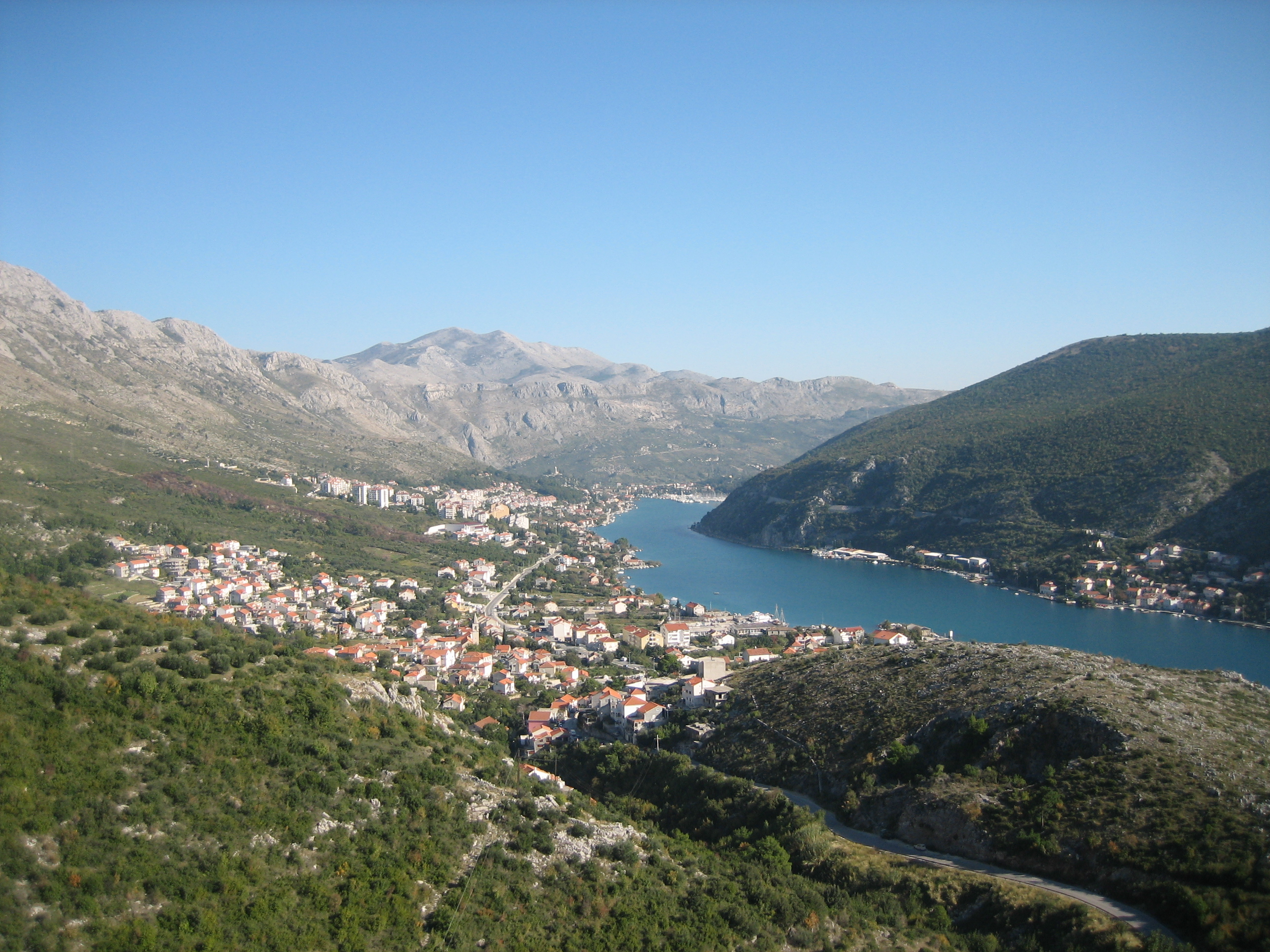
Rijeka Dubrovačka—a ria formed by the Ombla

As of 2012, the Ombla is used as a source of drinking water for the city of Dubrovnik. The water intake plant at Komolac has a water supply capacity of 560 litres (120 imperial gallons; 150 US gallons) per second. The Ombla has been used as a part of Dubrovnik's water supply network since 1897, when the first contract to supply 960 cubic metres (34,000 cubic feet) of water per day was made with an owner of watermills operating on the river. The river water becomes opaque, containing increased proportion of suspended particulate matter, three to five times a year for periods of four to five days after increased rainfall. The situation is proposed to be addressed through moving of the intake plant to a higher elevation during construction of a proposed Ombla Hydroelectric Power Plant (HPP). The new water intake is planned to be constructed at 55 metres (180 feet) a.s.l. These changes are expected to improve the quality of the drinking water, and to increase the water supply capacity to 1,500 litres (330 imperial gallons; 400 US gallons) per second. Average volume of water diverted to the water supply network varies considerably by month, peaking during summer tourist seasons. In August 2008, daily volume of water taken from Ombla for the water supply network averaged at 23,419 cubic metres (827,000 cubic feet). In 2008, the annual daily volume of the water diverted averaged 17,750 cubic metres (627,000 cubic feet).

=== Proposed power plant ===
The Ombla HPP is proposed to be built as an underground power plant utilizing headwaters of the Ombla River through a planned underground reservoir, which would hold the water behind a grout curtain and a concrete block extending from 250 metres (820 feet) below sea level to 135 metres (443 feet) a.s.l. The project entails flooding of a cavern system at the spring to a level 7 metres (23 feet) below the entrance to the 3,063-metre (10,049-foot) long Vilina Cave. The proposed power plant is planned to have productive capacity of 68 megawatts. The project is to be financed in part through a European Bank for Reconstruction and Development (EBRD) loan in the amount of 123.2 million Euros, approved on 22 November 2011. Total project cost is estimated at 152.4 million Euros. Pursuant to the European Union Habitats Directive, an additional assessment and a biodiversity management plan are required before the EBRD actually provides the approved funds. The documents should define any mitigating or compensating activities that might be needed.

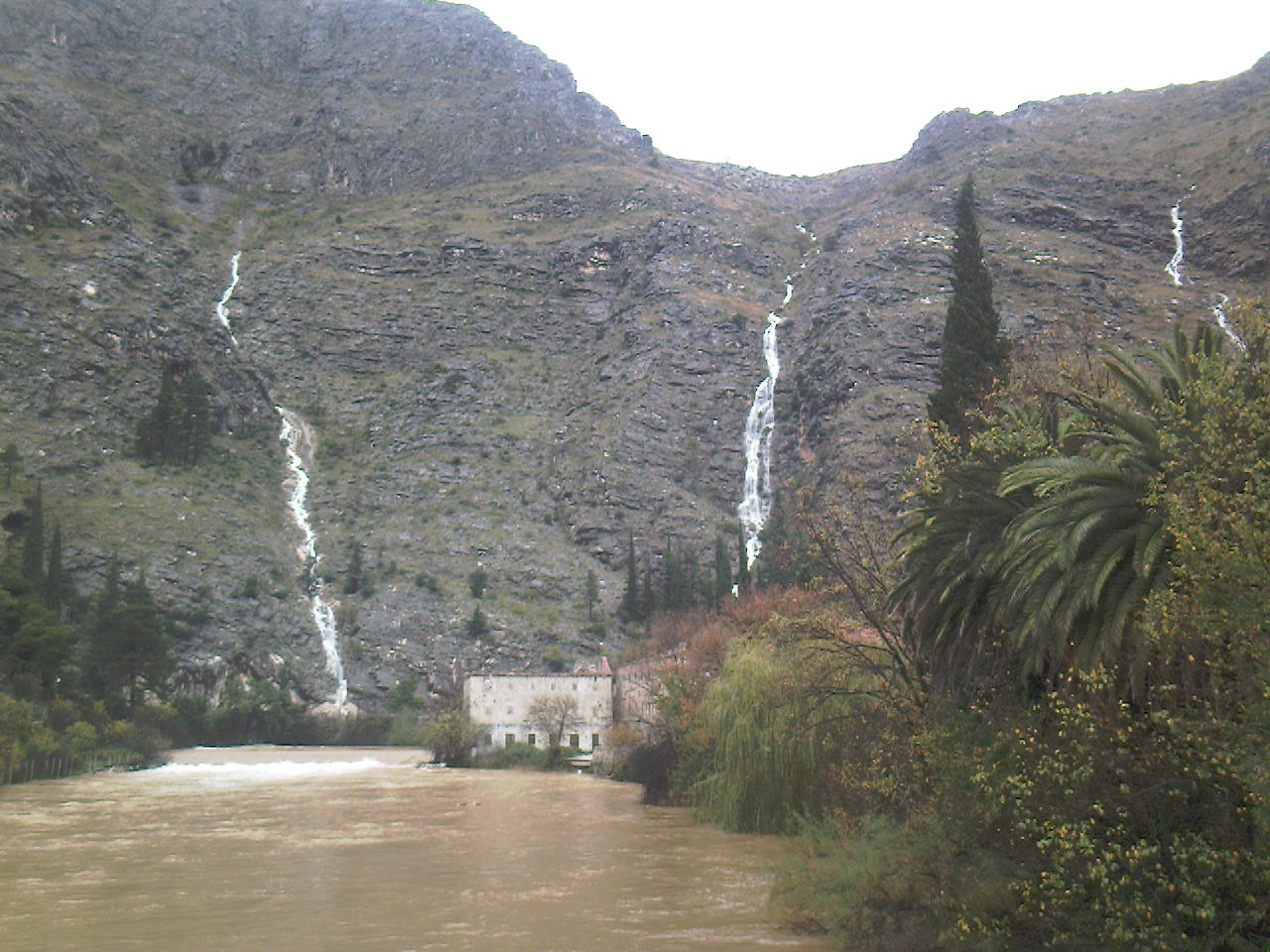
Ombla rises at the foot of Golubov Kamen massif, additional springs formed uphill after heavy rains

The development project became controversial as environmental protection non-governmental organizations (NGOs) drew public attention to a possible threat that may arise to seven species of bats. Subsequently, the NGOs alleged that the project is illegal, environmentally unsafe, financially not feasible, and technically questionable. Project legality was disputed because it is based on a 1999 environmental impact assessment (EIA), while Croatian legislation requires that EIAs must not be more than two years old. Flooding of Vilina Cave is cited as an environmental concern, while the financial issues are based on previous cost overruns by Hrvatska elektroprivreda—the state-owned company planning the development—in other projects. One objection to the technical aspects of the project is the possibility that the groundwater may trigger earthquakes. Opponents of the project have urged the Prime Minister of Croatia to cancel development of the plant.

After the elections of 2011, Mirela Holy, who had declared her opposition to the project prior to the elections, was appointed Minister of Environment and Nature Protection. In 2012 the ministry commissioned four reviews of the EIA. The reviews—one of them supporting the EIA and three disproving the conclusions of the original EIA—were submitted to the Government of Croatia one day after Holy resigned her post, reportedly over an unrelated matter, on 7 June 2012. Objections were raised by authors of the EIA that the reviews were not published and the names of the authors have been kept secret. Prime Minister Zoran Milanović said he wanted to collect opinions from the foremost Croatian, European, and worldwide experts before deciding on the matter, which has been under consideration since the early 1990s.

In May 2013, the European Bank for Reconstruction and Development cancelled its proposed loan to the project, pointing at environmental concerns.

== Etymology ==
In classical antiquity, the Ombla was a part of the river Arion, rising and sinking in present-day region of Herzegovina before resurfacing at the coast. This is the earliest known name of the river, reported in Periplus of Pseudo-Scylax. The most likely etymology of the river's name is that it is derived from the Latin Vimbula, being named after vineyards, or Humbla, since the river was once in Zachlumia. Alternatively it is proposed that the name of the river descended from the Slavic word ubao or ubla, meaning a pit containing water, possibly a water well. Since the 16th century, the river was called Ombla or Umbla, or a variety of similar names which all translate as "River"—Rika, Rieka, Ričina, and Rijeka. In the 19th century, the use of name Orion was also reported, apparently based on the Arion of the classical period. The word ombla means 'sweet water' in Albanian.

== See also ==
- Geography of Croatia
- List of rivers of Croatia
