= Petrovo Selo, Dubrovnik =

Petrovo Selo
- Village
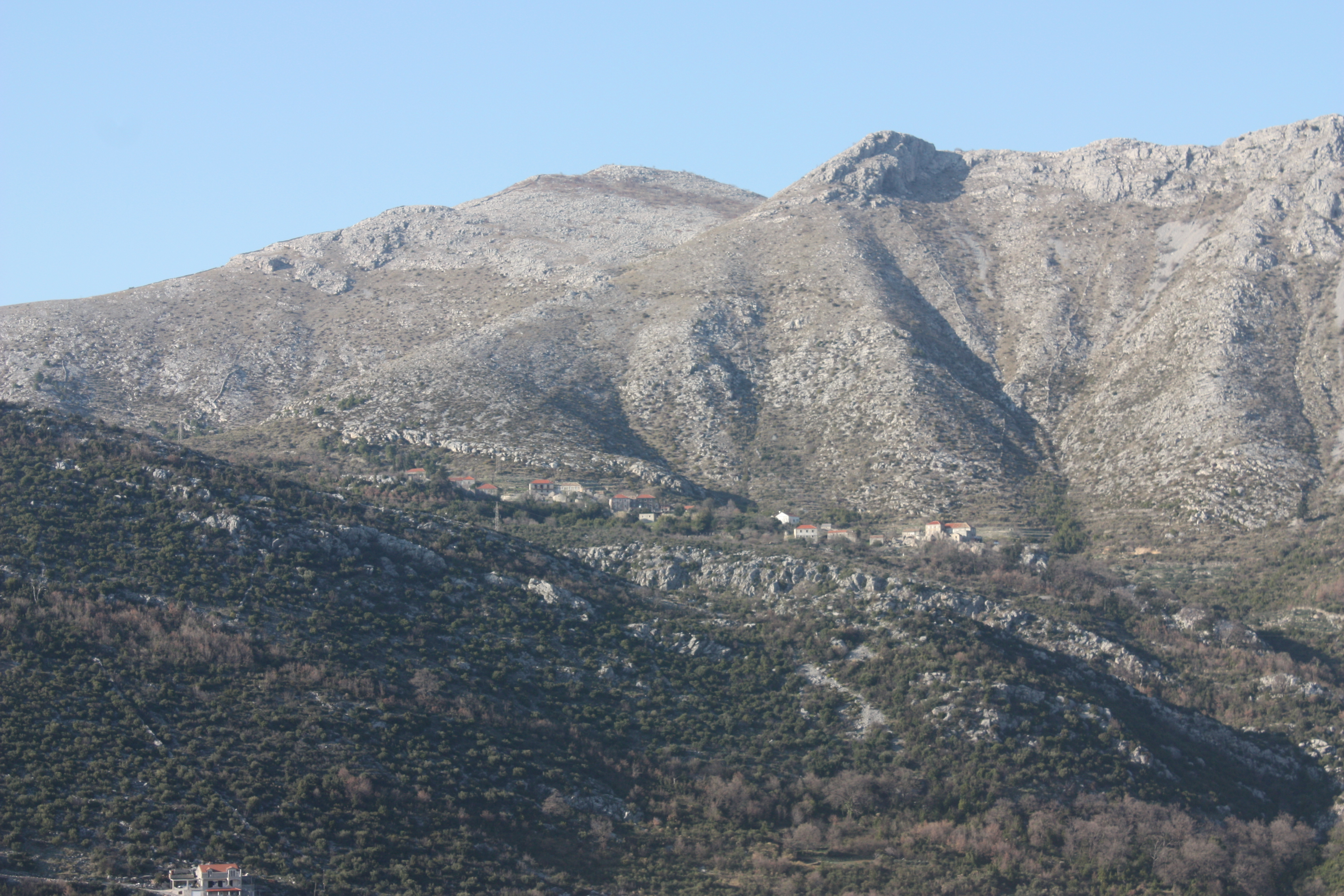
- Interactive map of Petrovo Selo
- Location within Croatia
- Coordinates: 42.685°N 18.09°E
- Country: Croatia
- County: Dubrovnik-Neretva County
- Municipality: Dubrovnik

Area
  - Total: 1.0 sq mi (2.7 km^{2})

Population (2021)
  - Total: 24
  - Density: 23/sq mi (8.9/km^{2})
- Time zone: UTC+1 (CET)
  - Summer (DST): UTC+2 (CEST)

Petrovo Selo is a village in Croatia.

== Demographics ==
According to the 2021 census, its population was 24.
