= Komolac =

- Village
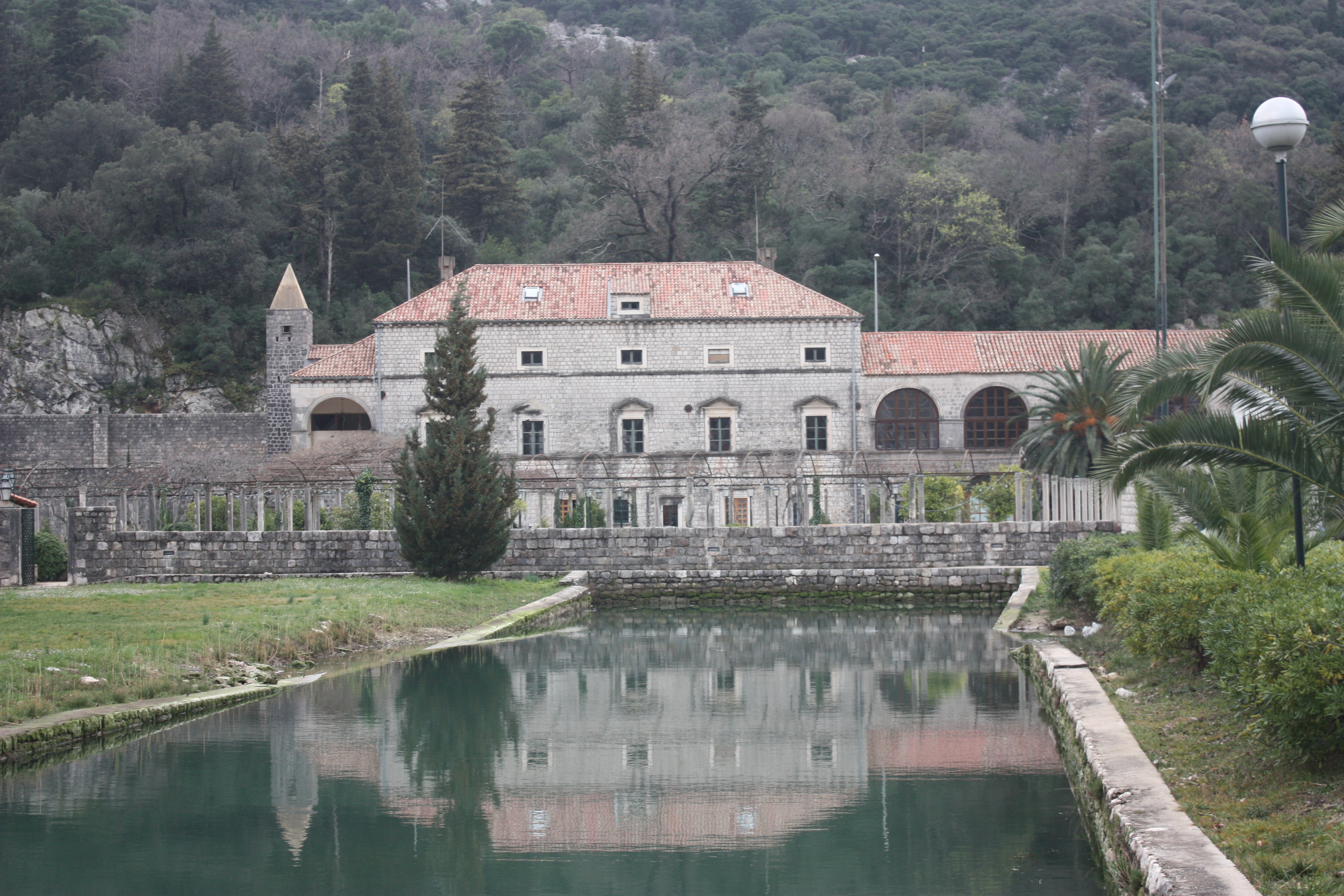

- Location within Croatia
- Country: Croatia
- County: Dubrovnik-Neretva County
- Municipality: Dubrovnik

Area
  - Total: 0.85 sq mi (2.2 km^{2})

Population (2021)
  - Total: 355
  - Density: 420/sq mi (160/km^{2})
- Time zone: UTC+1 (CET)
  - Summer (DST): UTC+2 (CEST)

Komolac is one of two city districts Dubrovnik, Croatia, which are located in the region of Rijeka Dubrovacka. It includes the populated places of Komolac, Rozat, Prijevor and Sumet.

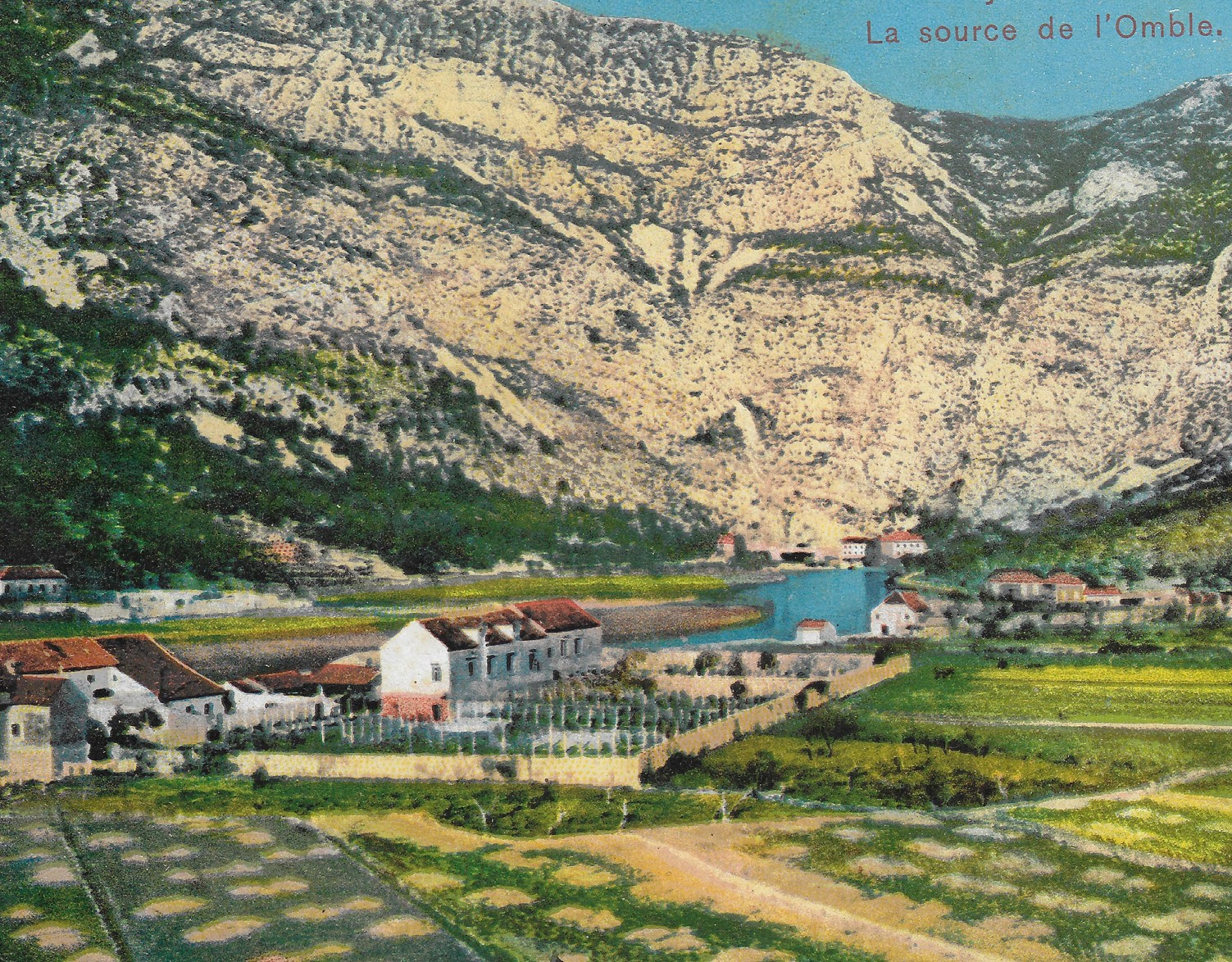
Summer House of Pero Kolic 1900-1913

Komolac is known for its waterfall of the shortest river in the world, the Ombla. The falls have been supplying the city of Dubrovnik with drinking water since the time of the Republic of Dubrovnik, more precisely since 1438, when the first Dubrovnik water supply system was put into operation. Among other sights are the Church of The Holy Spirit, the Church of the Annunciation, the Church of St. Tripun, the House Gundulic, the summer House Bizzaro - Facenda, Summer House Pero Kolic and Summer House Sokorcevic - Skala, which are entered in the Registar of Cultural Heritage of The Republic of Croatia. A monument to the fallen veterans in Komolac, unveiled on May 26, 2017, on the occasion of the 25th anniversary of the liberation of Dubrovnik, is also located in Komolac.

== Demographics ==
According to the 2021 census, its population was 355.
