= Nova Mokošica =

Settlement in Dubrovnik-Neretva County, Croatia

- Settlement
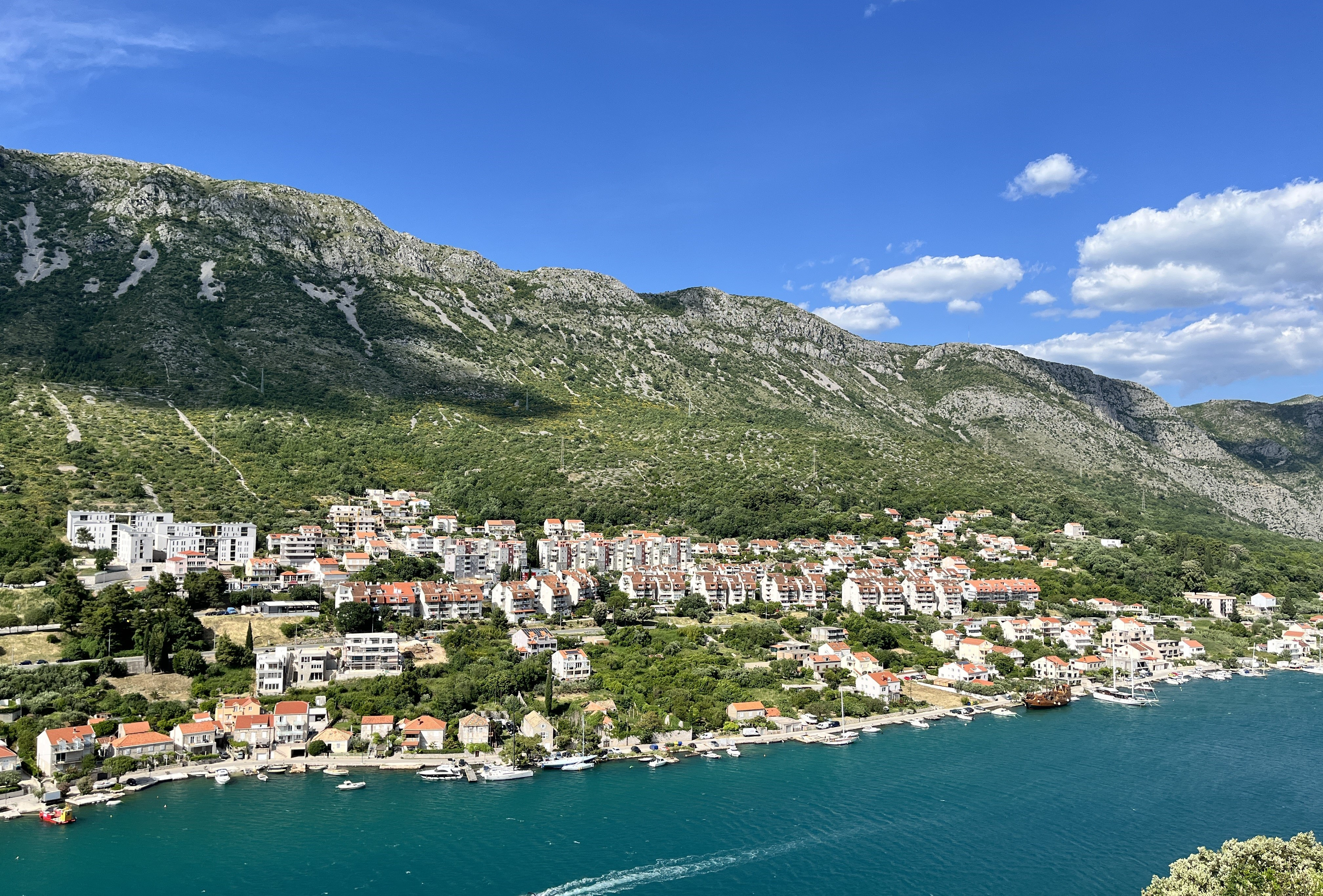
- Interactive map of Nova Mokošica
- Location within Croatia
- Coordinates: 42°40′34″N 18°06′25″E
- Country: Croatia
- County: Dubrovnik-Neretva
- City: Dubrovnik

Area
  - Total: 0.4 km^{2} (0.15 sq mi)

Population (2021)
  - Total: 5,682
  - Density: 14,000/km^{2} (37,000/sq mi)
- Time zone: UTC+1 (CET)
  - Summer (DST): UTC+2 (CEST)
- Postal code: 20236 Mokošica

Nova Mokošica is a settlement in the City of Dubrovnik in Croatia. In 2021, its population was 5682.

== History ==
Nova Mokošica is a residential district developed from the early 1980s with the construction of multi-story dwellings. Situated on terrain once covered by olive groves, vineyards, and fields, the district has evolved to include a range of amenities. These include residential buildings, a primary school, a sports hall, a kindergarten, a health center, cafes, shops, a bank, a bakery, a post office, betting shops, children's playgrounds, and sports courts for adults. Plans exist for the construction of a new church and a large shopping center.

The initial phase of development featured numerous high-rise buildings erected in the 1980s and early 1990s. Subsequent phases saw the introduction of smaller residential structures. These typically consist of three to four-story residential buildings and two-story villas with up to four rooms per unit. In 2005, a fourth phase commenced, focusing on buildings under the Housing Incentive Program (POS), significantly altering the district's appearance.

== Demographics ==
Nova Mokošica: Population trends 1991–2021
v

population		6041	6016	5682
	1991	2001	2011	2021

Sources: Croatian Bureau of Statistics publications
