= Žitomislić Monastery =

Serbian Orthodox monastery near Mostar, Bosnia and Herzegovina

Coordinates: 43.204628278225144°N 17.79378609519168°E

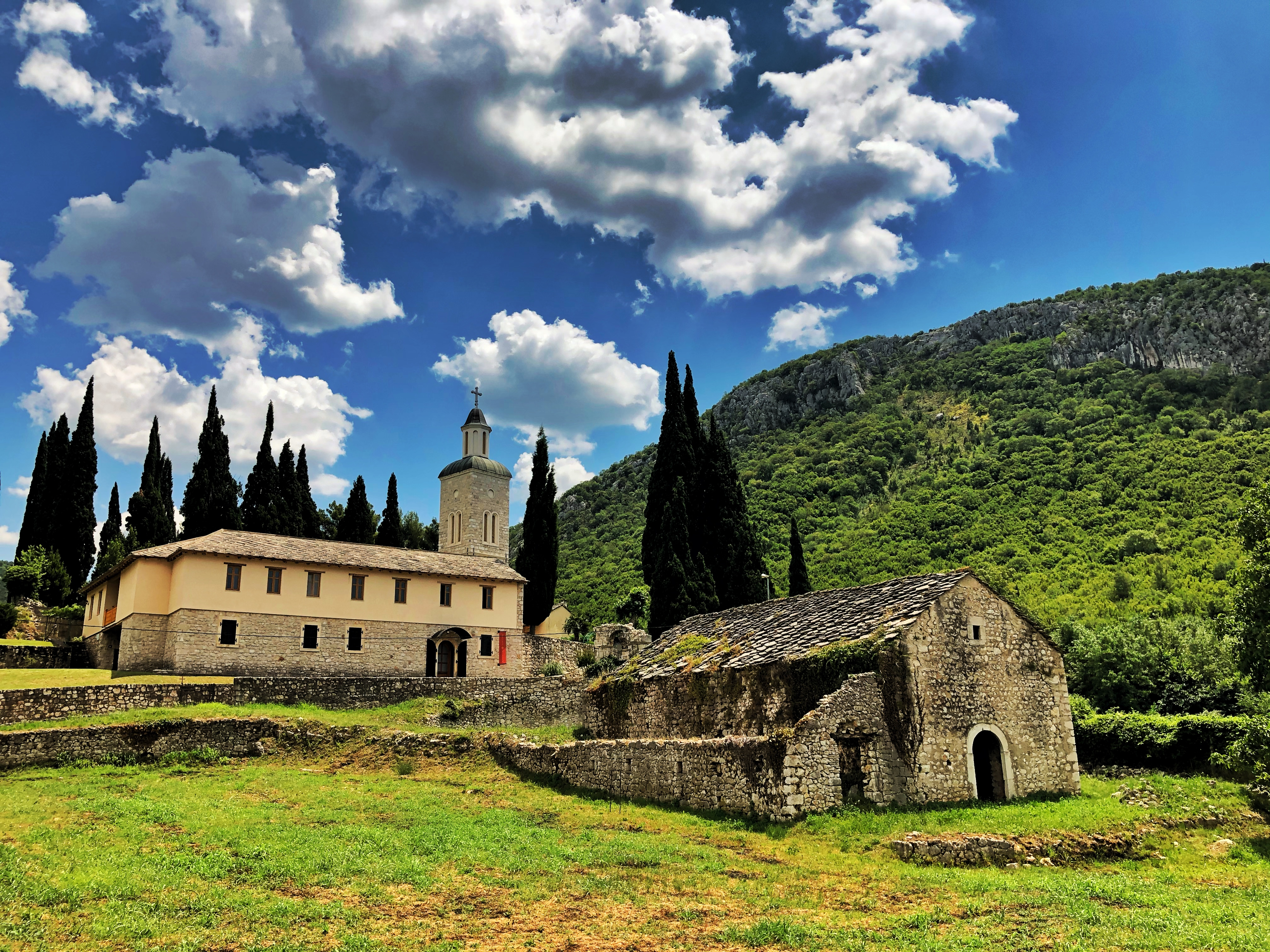

- Location within Bosnia and Herzegovina

Religion
- Affiliation: Serbian Orthodox Church
- Rite: Eastern Orthodox
- Ecclesiastical or organisational status: Eparchy of Zachlumia, Herzegovina, and the Littoral
- Patron: Annunciation
- Year consecrated: between 1602/1603 and 1609

Location
- Location: Žitomislić
- Municipality: Mostar
- State: Bosnia and Herzegovina
- Interactive map of Žitomislić Monastery

Architecture
- Founder: Duke Petar and Jovan Hrabren
- Groundbreaking: 1556
- Completed: 16th century
- Materials: stone
- Designated as NHL

KONS of Bosnia and Herzegovina
- Official name: Monastery Žitomislić, the historic site
- Type: Category I cultural and historical property
- Criteria: A, B, C iv.v., D ii.v., E ii.iii.iv.v., F, G i.iii.iv.vi., I.
- Designated: 6 November 2002 (- th session; decision No.01-279/02)
- Reference no.: 1815
- List of National Monuments of Bosnia and Herzegovina

The Žitomislić Monastery (Serbian: Манастир Житомислић, romanized: Manastir Žitomislić, pronounced [ʒitǒmislit͜ɕ]) is а Serbian Orthodox monastery dedicated to the Annunciation and located near Mostar, Bosnia and Herzegovina.

== History ==
In 1566, the Ottoman Empire, as represented by the kadija (qadi) in Nevesinje, granted the Miloradović-Hrabren family a permit to build monastery at Žitomislić over the ruins of an older church. The monastery took more than forty years to complete with the first reference to monks at Žitomislić in 1606. The monastery boasted a highly artistic iconostasis, and housed a scriptorium of considerable activity and renown in its time. At the height of its existence the monastery was supported by large land holdings worked by the monks themselves.

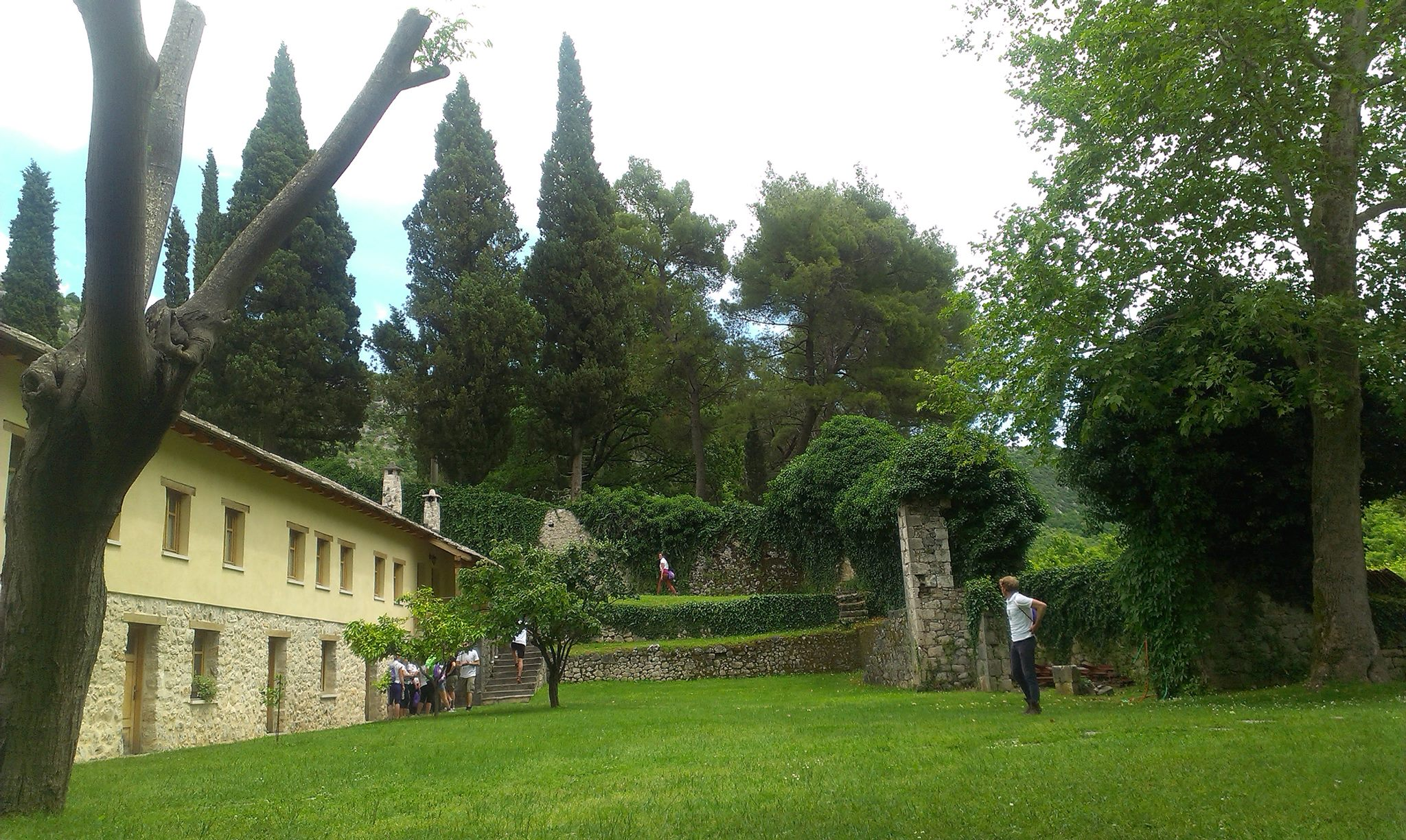
Courtyard

Early in the 19th century, the prior, Simeon Miljković, took on improvements to the monastery that included guest quarters, local water, and a new vineyard. A seminary was opened in 1858. The entire brotherhood of Žitomislić monastery was arrested by the Croatian fascist Ustasha on 26 June 1941, and driven to the village of Blizanci, where they were tortured and killed, some being thrown alive into the Vidonja cave-pit.

The monastery was plundered and the entire compound was destroyed with the sole exception of the monastery church. The bodies of the monks were recovered from the pit in 1990 and buried in 1991, with Serbian Patriarch Pavle officiating at the service.

In 1992, during the Bosnian War, Žitomislić was destroyed by the Croatian Defence Council. At that time the library contained dozens of old manuscripts from the 16th and 17th centuries including a small archive of Ottoman documents. The treasury was plundered and the buildings, including the cemetery were dynamited and bulldozed to the ground. The stones were left where they fell, however, and when reconstruction of Žitomislić officially began in 2002, its prior architecture was meticulously reconstructed. In 2005, the regular session of the Holy Assembly of Bishops of the Serbian Orthodox Church began in the fully restored Žitomislić Monastery.

== See also ==
- List of Serbian Orthodox monasteries
- Serbs of Mostar

== Sources ==
- Kojić, Ljubinka (1983). "Историја". Манастир Житомислић [Žitomislić Monastery]. Veselin Masleša.
- Milošević, Borivoje. "Манастир Житомислић у XIX вијеку." Зборник радова Филозофског факултета у Приштини 54.2 (2024): 211-228.
- Моморовић, Петар. "Капители манастира Житомислића." Богословље 28.Св. 1-2 (1969): 123-138.
