= Rijeka Dubrovačka =

Coastal inlet in Croatia

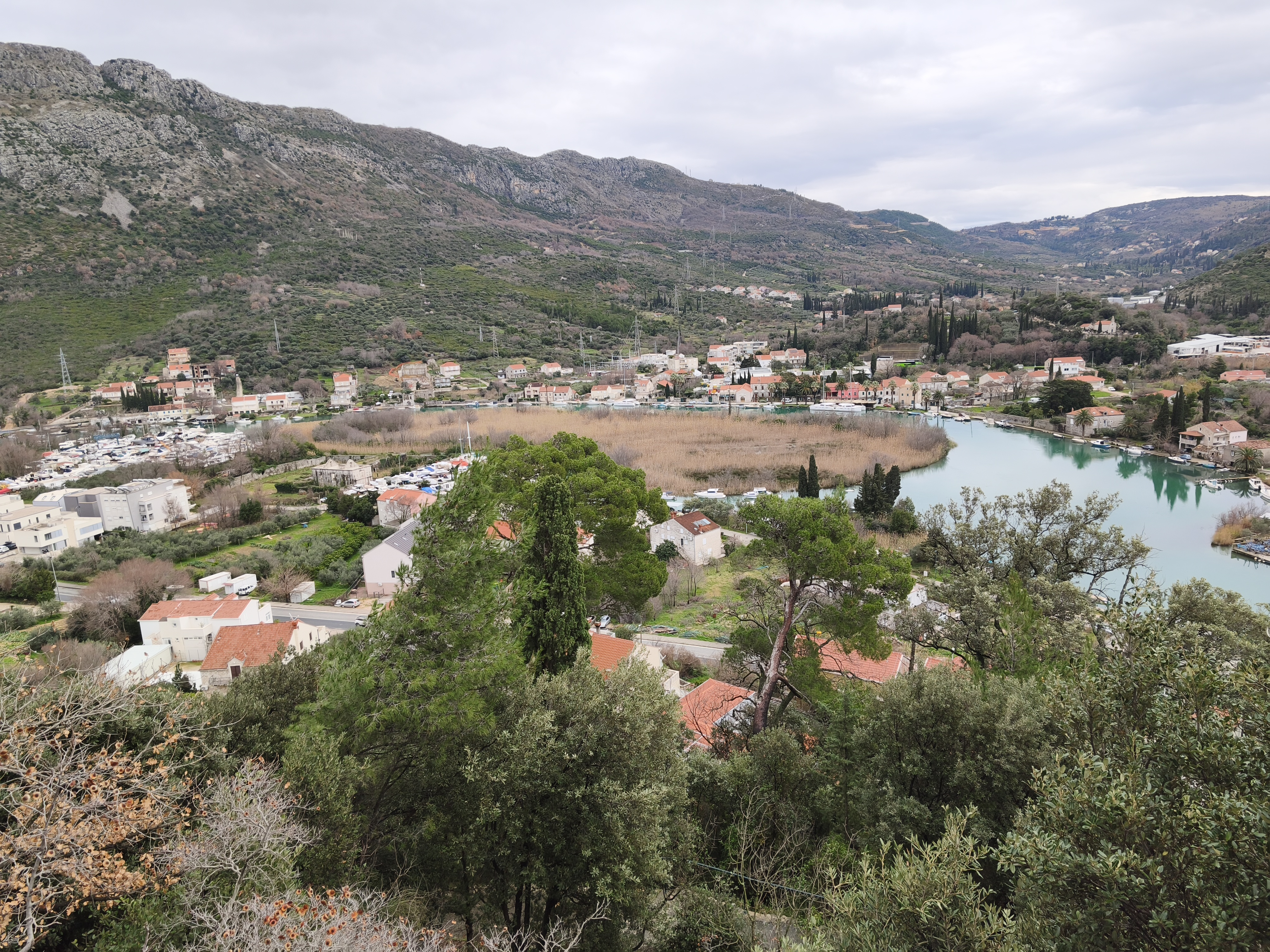
View on Rijeka Dubrovačka

Rijeka Dubrovačka is a ria (coastal inlet) to the north of Dubrovnik, Croatia, on the coast of the Adriatic Sea. The Ombla river flows into Rijeka Dubrovačka. The Franjo Tuđman Bridge spans it, carrying the D8 state road.
