= Eparchy of Zachlumia, Herzegovina, and the Littoral =

Diocese of the Serbian Orthodox Church

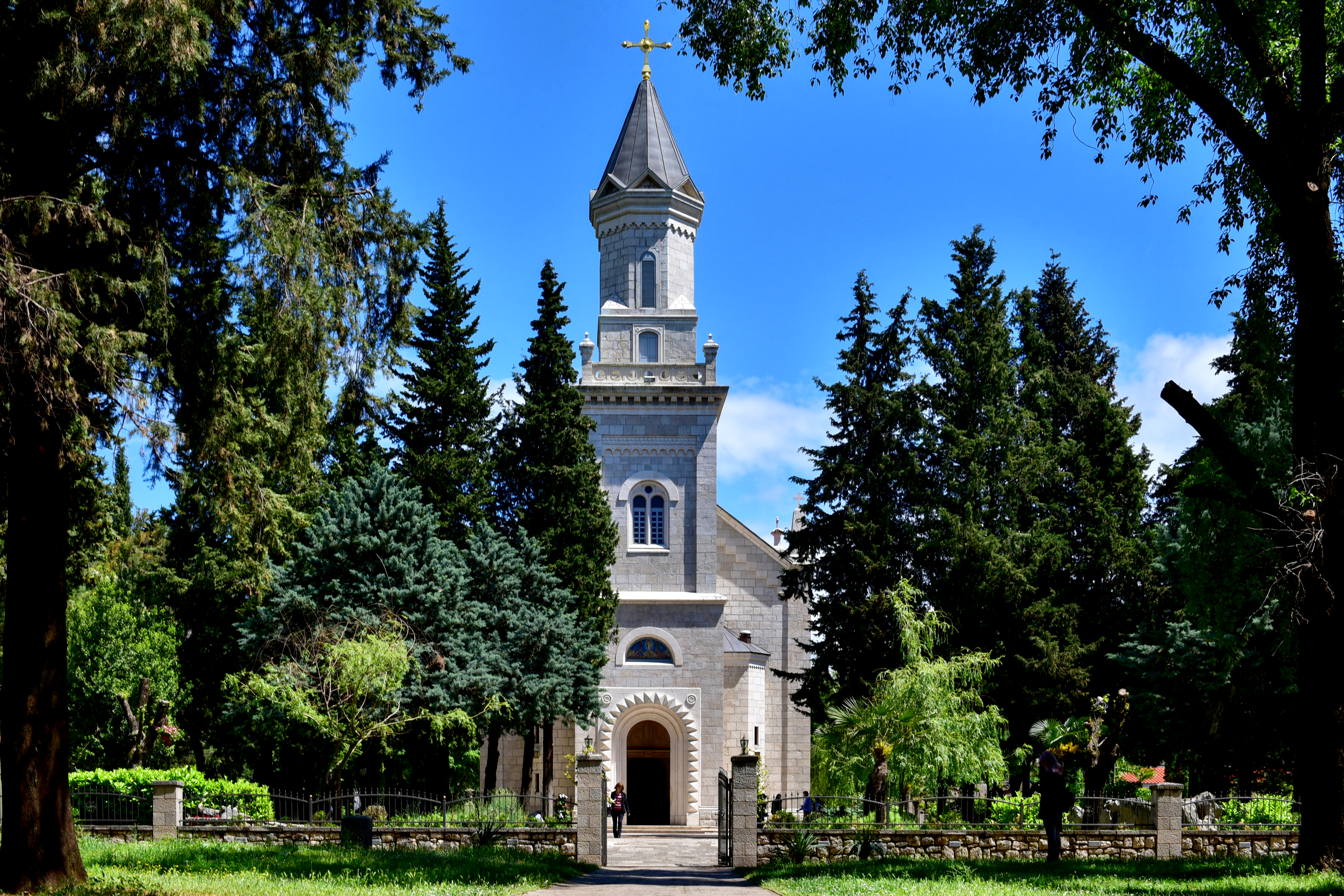
- Cathedral of the Transfiguration of the Lord, Trebinje

Location
- Territory: Herzegovina (Bosnia and Herzegovina) and southern Dalmatia (Croatia)
- Headquarters: Trebinje, Bosnia and Herzegovina

Information
- Denomination: Eastern Orthodox
- Sui iuris church: Serbian Orthodox Church
- Established: 1219
- Cathedral: Cathedral of the Transfiguration of the Lord, Trebinje
- Language: Church Slavonic, Serbian

Current leadership
- Bishop: Dimitrije Rađenović

Map

Website
- Eparchy of Zachlumia, Herzegovina, and the Littoral

The Eparchy of Zachlumia, Herzegovina, and the Littoral (Serbian: Епархија захумско-херцеговачка и приморска, romanized: Eparhija zahumsko-hercegovačka i primorska) is a diocese (eparchy) of the Serbian Orthodox Church covering Herzegovina region in Bosnia and Herzegovina, southern Dalmatia in Croatia, as well as Sutorina village in Montenegro.

The episcopal see is located at the Cathedral of the Transfiguration of the Lord, Trebinje. Its headquarters and bishop's residence are also in Trebinje.

== History ==
The region was under the Metropolitanate of Dyrrachium, which in turn was under the Ecumenical Patriarchate of Constantinople or the Roman Catholic Archdiocese of Bar. In 1089, the see of Travunia was briefly under the jurisdiction of the Archdiocese of Bar. The territory was constantly in a feudal state of continuous religious wars between the Roman Catholic and Eastern Orthodox denominations long before the incursion of Ottoman invaders.

The Eparchy of Hum was founded in 1219 by Saint Sava, the same year the Serbian Archbishopric acquired its autocephaly status from the Ecumenical Patriarchate of Constantinople. Thus, it was one of the original Serbian Orthodox bishoprics with jurisdiction over the historical regions of Zachlumia and Travunia. The first Bishop of Hum was Ilarion, succeeded by Sava II (son of Serbian King Stefan the First-Crowned). The original seat of the eparchy was in Ston, at the Church of the Most Holy Theotokos. Following an earthquake in 1250s, the bishop moved the seat to the Monastery of Holy Apostles in the Lim Valley. From that time, the Eparchy of Hum was sometimes also called Eparchy of Lim.

During the War of Hum, most of Zachlumia was taken over by Stephen II, Ban of Bosnia, but the Travunia region remained under the rule of Serbian kings. After the establishment of the Serbian Patriarchate of Peć in 1346, all original Serbian bishoprics were raised to the honorary rank of metropolitanates. The see of the eparchy was then moved to the Mileševa Monastery. In the middle of 15th century, Metropolitan David was a very influential figure on the court of Stefan Kosača, who was titled Duke (Herzeg) of Saint Sava. Following the fall of the Duchy of Saint Sava to the Ottoman Empire in 1482, the see was frequently moved, only to settle at the Tvrdoš Monastery in 1508. Eventually, the Eparchy of Mileševa was formed from the parts of the Eparchy of Hum.

In 1557, the Serbian Patriarchate of Peć was restored and the Eparchy of Herzegovina was returned to its jurisdiction, with its bishops holding the honorary title of metropolitan. In 1766, when the Serbian Patriarchate of Peć was abolished, the Eparchy of Herzegovina and all other Serbian eparchies in the Ottoman Empire came under the jurisdiction of Ecumenical Patriarchate of Constantinople. Bishops of Herzegovina kept their honorary title of Metropolitan. The seat of metropolitanate was transferred to Mostar. In 1878, the territory of Bosnia and Herzegovina was under the occupation of Austria-Hungary, but under the Church Convention of 1880, all Eastern Orthodox eparchies remained under the ecclesiastical jurisdiction of the Ecumenical Patriarchate of Constantinople. An arrangement was made whereby the patriarch held jurisdiction over the Eastern Orthodox churches in Bosnia and Herzegovina, while Asutria-Hungary was allowed to nominate its bishops, with the patriarch in Constantinople paying an annual fee.

After World War I and the creation of the Kingdom of Yugoslavia, a council of Eastern Orthodox bishops in Bosnia and Herzegovina unanimously decided to unite with other Serbian ecclesiastical provinces to form the unified Serbian Orthodox Church, a process completed in 1920. At that time the eparchy was renamed to Eparchy of Zachlumia, Herzegovina, and the Littoral. The episcopal see was at the Holy Trinity Cathedral in Mostar. The diocese encompassed the districts Mostar, Bileća, Gacko, Nevesinje, Stolac, and Trebinje, the towns of Dubrovnik and Metković, as well as the island of Korčula.

During the World War II a large number of churches were damaged or destroyed, along with parish homes, libraries, and church archives.

During the Yugoslav Wars, the Eparchy of Zachlumia, Herzegovina, and the Littoral of all dioceses of the Serbian Orthodox Church sustained the most damage. Twenty-four churches were destroyed and sixteen heavily damaged, in addition to the destruction of Zavala Monastery. Ten cemeteries were either destroyed or desecrated. In Mostar everything belonging to the Serbian Orthodox Church was destroyed. Between 7 and 8 June 1992, the Holy Trinity Cathedral was shelled and on 15 June the belltowers were destroyed and the cathedral was set ablaze. Subsequently, the remaining walls were mined, and the church was turned into rubble. As of 2026, reconstruction of the church is ongoing. The old church, built in the 16th century and dedicated to the Nativity of the Theotokos, was also destroyed. The Bishop's Palace, built in the 19th century, was mined, while the Žitomislić Monastery also met the same fate.

== List of bishops ==
- Ilarion (13th century)
- Metodije (13th century)
- Teodosije (13th century)
- Nikola (13th century)
- Sava (until 1264)
- Jevstatije (c. 1305)
- Jovan I (c. 1316)
- Danilo (1316–1324)
- Stefan I (1324)
- Mileševa (c. 1377)
- David (c. 1465)
- Jovan II (1508–1513)
- Visarion I (1509–1525)
- Maksim I (before 1532)
- Marko (1531–1534)
- Nikanor (1534–1546)
- Antonije I (1570–1573)
- Savatije I (1573–1585)
- Visarion II (1590–1602)
- Silvestar (1602–1611)
- Simeon I (1613–1635)
- Savatije II (1635–1642)
- Maksim II (1643–1648)
- Pajsije (1648–1651)
- Arsenije I (1651)
- Vasilije (1651–1671)
- Simeon II (1671–1681)
- Savatije III (1681–1693)
- Nektarije (1693–1712)
- Melentije (1712–1713)
- Arsenije II (1715)
- Gerasim (1715–1727)
- Aksentije I (1727–1736)
- Filotej (1741–1741)
- Aksentije II (1751–1760)
- Stefan II (1763–1766)
- Antim (1766–1772)
- Likanije (1772–1802)
- Jeremija (1803–1815)
- Josif I (1816–1835)
- Prokopije I (1838–1848)
- Josif II (1848–1854)
- Grigorije I (1855–1860)
- Joanikije (1860–1864)
- Prokopije II (1864–1875)
- Ignjatije (1875–1888)
- Leontije (1888)
- Serafim Perović (1889–1903)
- Petar Zimonjić (1903–1920)
- Jovan Ilić (1926–1931)
- Simeon Stanković (1932–1934)
- Tihon Radovanović (1934–1939)
- Nikolaj Jovanović (1939–1943)
- Longin Tomić (1951–1955)
- Vladislav Mitrović (1955–1991)
- Atanasije Jevtić (1992–1999)
- Grigorije Durić (1999–2018)
- Dimitrije Rađenović (2018–present)

== Notable monasteries ==
- Tvrdoš
- Žitomislić
- Hercegovačka Gračanica
- Duži
- Zavala
- Dobrićevo

== Gallery ==
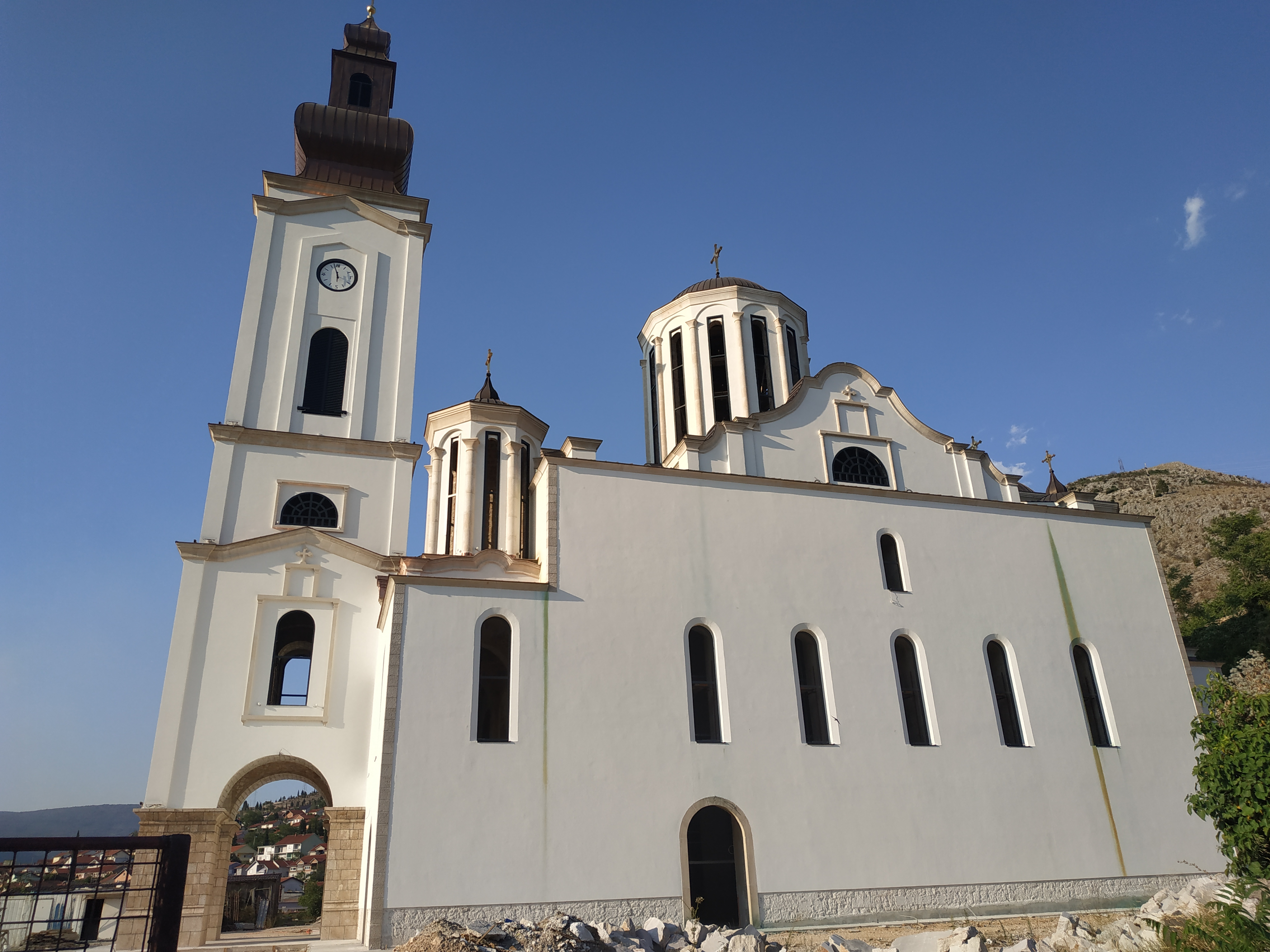
Holy Trinity Cathedral (Mostar)

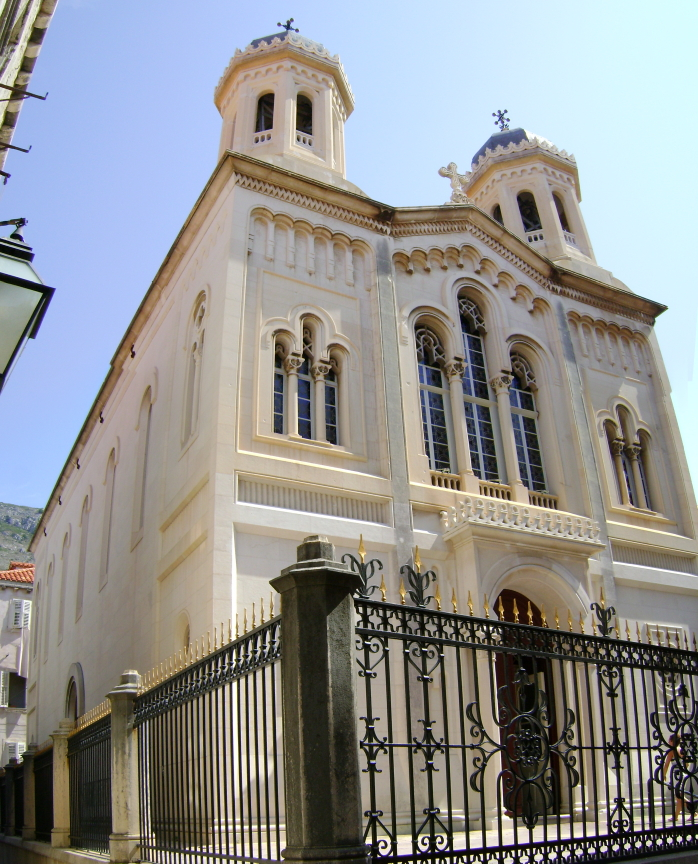
Church of the Holy Annunciation (Dubrovnik)

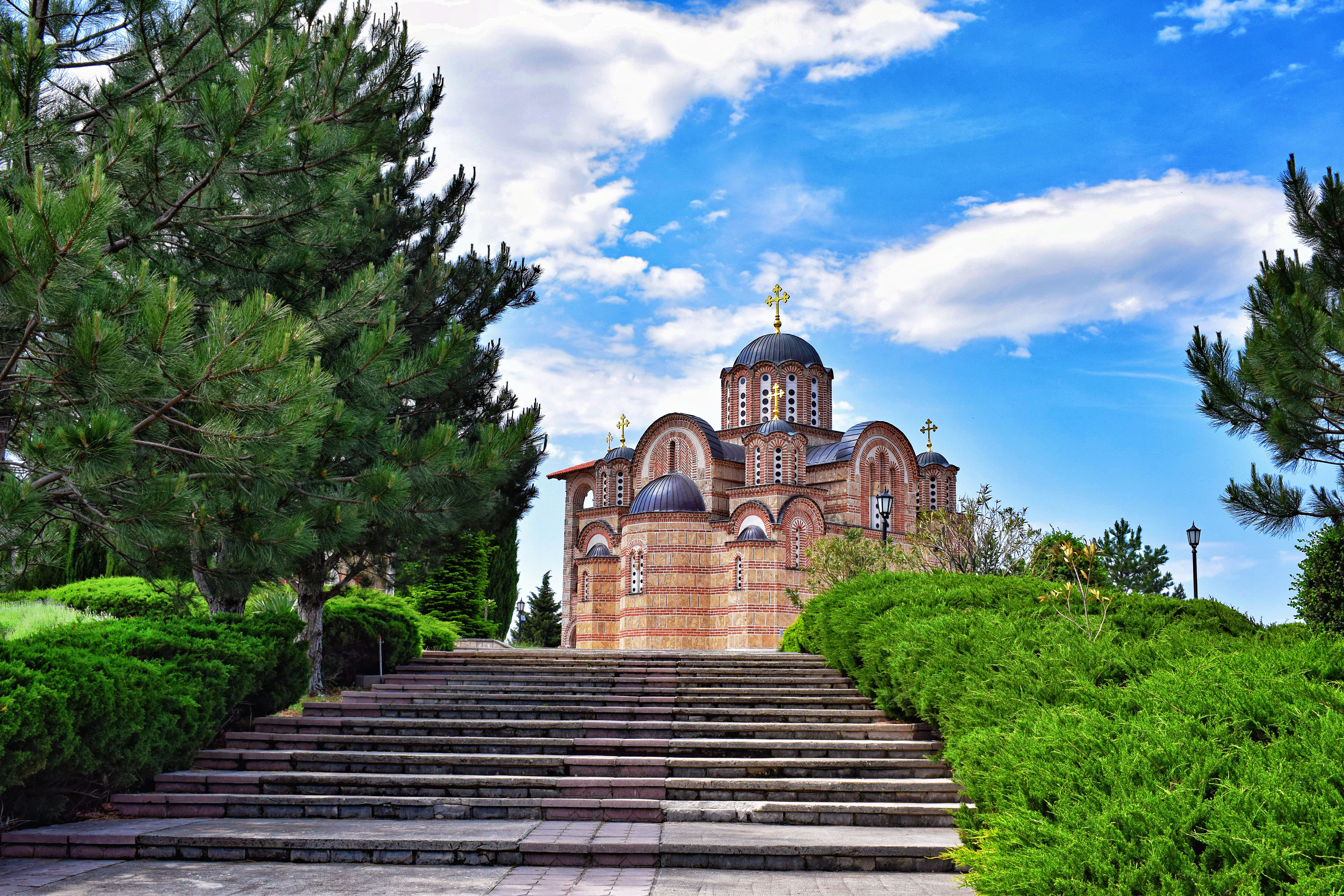
Hercegovačka Gračanica Monastery (Trebinje)

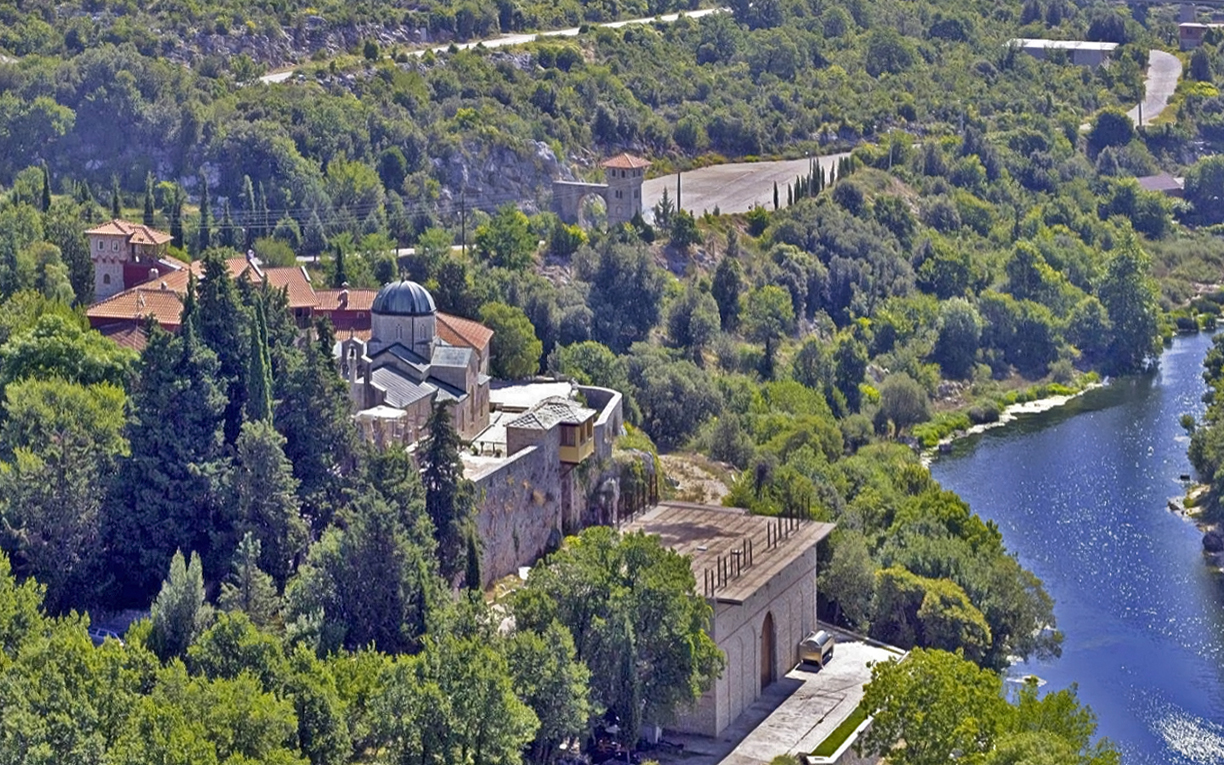
Tvrdoš Monastery
(near Trebinje)

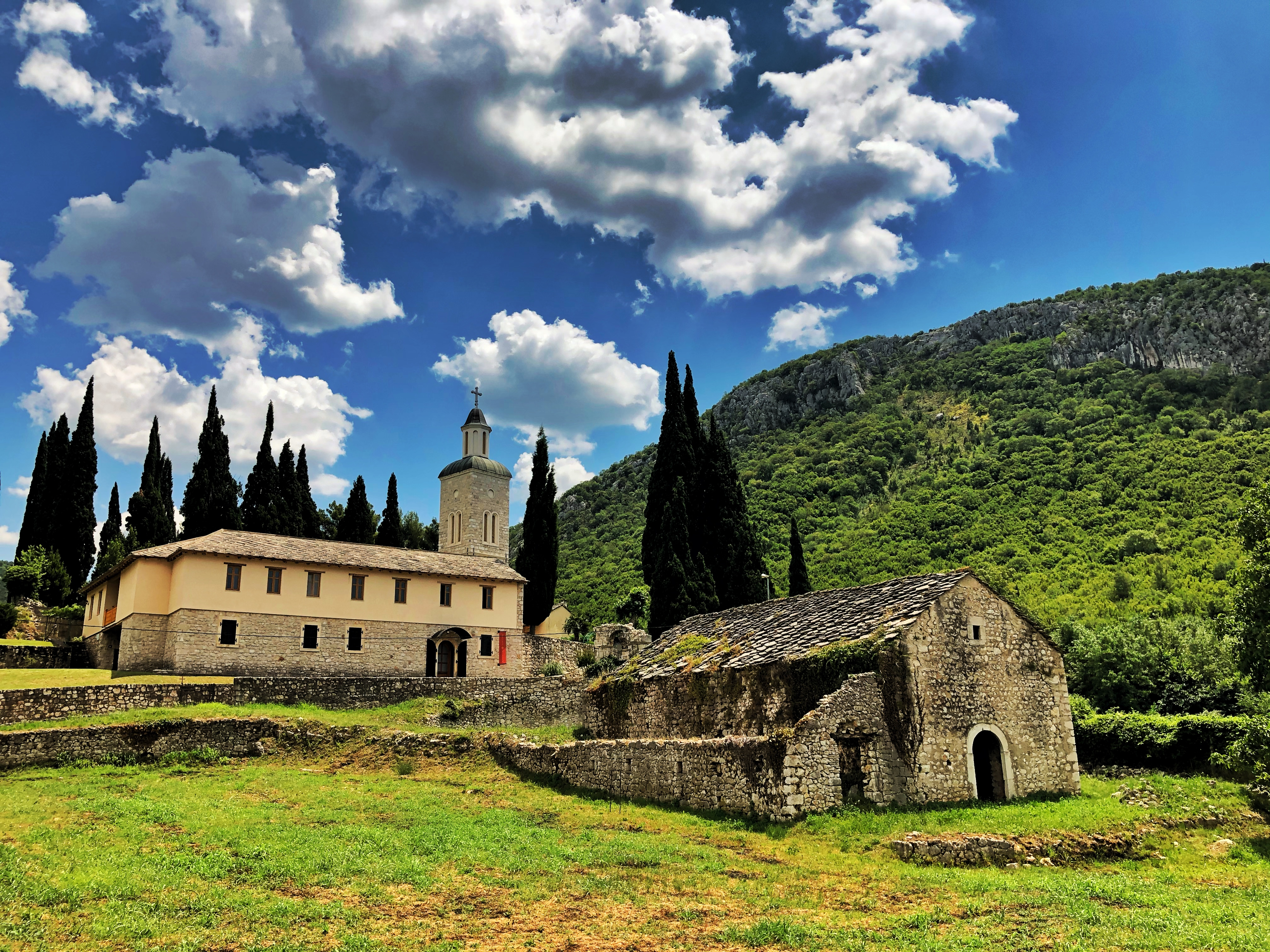
Žitomislić Monastery
(near Mostar)

== See also ==
- Eastern Orthodoxy in Bosnia and Herzegovina
- Eparchies and metropolitanates of the Serbian Orthodox Church
- Serbs of Bosnia and Herzegovina

== Sources ==
- Čuvalo, Ante (2010). The A to Z of Bosnia and Herzegovina. Rowman & Littlefield. ISBN 978-0-81087-647-7.
- Kiminas, Demetrius (2009). The Ecumenical Patriarchate: A History of Its Metropolitanates with Annotated Hierarch Catalogs. Wildside Press LLC. ISBN 9781434458766.
- Mileusnić, Slobodan (1997). Spiritual Genocide: A survey of destroyed, damaged and desecrated churches, monasteries and other church buildings during the war 1991–1995 (1997). Belgrade: Museum of the Serbian Orthodox Church.
- Sotirović, Vladislav B. (2011). "The Serbian Patriarchate of Peć in the Ottoman Empire: The First Phase (1557–94)". Serbian Studies: Journal of the North American Society for Serbian Studies. 25 (2): 143–169. doi:10.1353/ser.2011.0038. S2CID 143629322.
