= List of power stations in Bosnia and Herzegovina =

Bosnia-Herzegovina Power station list

The following page lists all power stations in Bosnia and Herzegovina.

== Hydroelectric ==
Station	Town	Coordinates	Capacity (MW)
Čapljina Hydroelectric Power Station (Lower Horizons System)	Čapljina	43.012590°N 17.803620°E	430
Višegrad Hydroelectric Power Station	Višegrad	43.760324°N 19.289053°E	315
Salakovac Hydroelectric Power Station	Potoci	43.447752°N 17.836906°E	210
Jablanica Hydroelectric Power Station	Jablanica	43.692406°N 17.732577°E	180
Trebinje Hydroelectric Power Station (Lower Horizons System)	Gornje Grančarevo	42.706912°N 18.381028°E	180
Rama Hydroelectric Power Station	Ravnica	43.747041°N 17.675838°E	161
Grabovica Hydroelectric Power Station	Grabovica	43°35′12.2″N 17°43′07.3″E	114
Bočac Hydroelectric Power Station	Surjan	44.562603°N 17.135024°E	110
Mostar Hydroelectric Power Station	Vrapčići	43°22′38.8″N 17°50′42.2″E	72
Jajce-1 Hydroelectric Power Station	Jajce	44°22′37.3″N 17°16′54.7″E	60
Mostarsko Blato Hydroelectric Power Station	Rodoč	43°17′56.1″N 17°47′39.3″E	60
Peć Mlini Hydroelectric Power Station	Peć Mlini	43°20′17.3″N 17°19′34.2″E	32
Jajce-2 Hydroelectric Power Station	Jajce	44.411737°N 17.263513°E	30
Bogatići Small Hydroelectric Power Station	Bogatići		10
Slapovi na Una Hydroelectric Power Station	Kostela	44°53′02.4″N 15°54′00.5″E	10
Bočac 2 Hydroelectric Power Station (Bočac HPP compensation basin)		44°33′45.6″N 17°08′05.2″E	8.8
Trebinje-2 Hydroelectric Power Station (Lower Horizons System) (Trebinje HPP compensation basin)	Gorica, Trebinje	42°42′24.3″N 18°22′49.3″E	8
Upper Horizons Hydroelectric Power Stations System	Eastern Herzegovina		

== Coal ==
Name	Location	Entity	Coordinates	Capacity, MWe	Operational	Notes
Ugljevik Thermal Power Plant	Ugljevik	Republika Srpska	44°40′55.43″N 18°58′2.1″E	300	1977–present	310 m tall chimney
Gacko Thermal Power Plant	Gacko	Republika Srpska	43°10′26″N 18°30′59″E	300	1977–present	160 m tall chimney
Stanari Thermal Power Plant	Stanari	Republika Srpska	44°45′14″N 17°47′36″E	300	2016–present	150 m tall chimney
Kakanj Thermal Power Plant	Čatići	Federation of Bosnia and Herzegovina	44°5′22.4″N 18°6′49.4″E	450	1987–present	300 m tall chimney
Tuzla Thermal Power Plant	Tuzla	Federation of Bosnia and Herzegovina	45°31′16″N 18°36′21″E	715	1963–present	300 m tall chimney

== See also ==
- List of power stations in Europe
- List of largest power stations in the world
