= Elektroprivreda Republike Srpske =

- Official logo
- Native name: Електропривреда Републике Српске
- Type: State-owned enterprise
- Industry: Electric utility
- Founded: 30 December 2005; 20 years ago (Current form); 1992; 34 years ago (Founded)
- Founder: National Assembly
- Headquarters: Trebinje, Republika Srpska, Bosnia and Herzegovina
- Key people: Luka Petrović (General director)
- Production output: 5.823 GWh (2016)
- Revenue: ▲€343.38 million (2016)
- Operating income: 102,953,000 convertible mark (2021)
- Net income: ▲€1.43 million (2016)
- Total assets: ▲€2.774 billion (2016)
- Total equity: ▲€1.862 billion (2016)
- Number of employees: 9,138 (2016)
- Subsidiaries: ZP Elektrokrajina a.d. Banja Luka; ZP Elektro Doboj a.d. Doboj; ZP Elektro Bijeljina a.d. Bijeljina; ZP Elektrodistribucija Pale a.d. Pale; ZP Elektrohercegovina a.d. Trebinje
- Website: ers.ba

Elektroprivreda Republike Srpske (Serbian Cyrillic: Електропривреда Републике Српске) or Elektroprivreda RS, is a state-owned integrated power company with headquarters in Trebinje, Republika Srpska in Hercegovina.

It is the largest employer in Republika Srpska and second-largest power utility in Bosnia and Herzegovina (after Elektroprivreda Bosne i Hercegovine).

== Power plants ==
The company operates the following power plants, directly, or through its subsidiaries:

Thermal power plants

- Gacko Thermal Power Plant
- Ugljevik Thermal Power Plant

Hydro power plants

- Višegrad Hydroelectric Power Station
- Trebinje-1 Hydroelectric Power Station
- Bočac Hydroelectric Power Station

== See also ==
- Elektroprivreda Bosne i Hercegovine
- Elektroprivreda HZ HB
- List of power stations in Bosnia and Herzegovina
