= Vrapčići, Mostar =

Suburb of Mostar, Bosnia and Herzegovina

Vrapčići
- Suburb
- Location within Bosnia and Herzegovina
- Coordinates: 43.374°N 17.851°E
- Country: Bosnia and Herzegovina
- Entity: Federation of Bosnia and Herzegovina
- Canton: Herzegovina-Neretva
- Municipality: City of Mostar

Area
  - Total: 5.08 sq mi (13.16 km^{2})

Population (2013)
  - Total: 3,266
  - Density: 642.8/sq mi (248.2/km^{2})
- Time zone: UTC+1 (CET)
  - Summer (DST): UTC+2 (CEST)
- Postal code: 88000 (Same as Mostar)
- Area code: (+387) 36 345

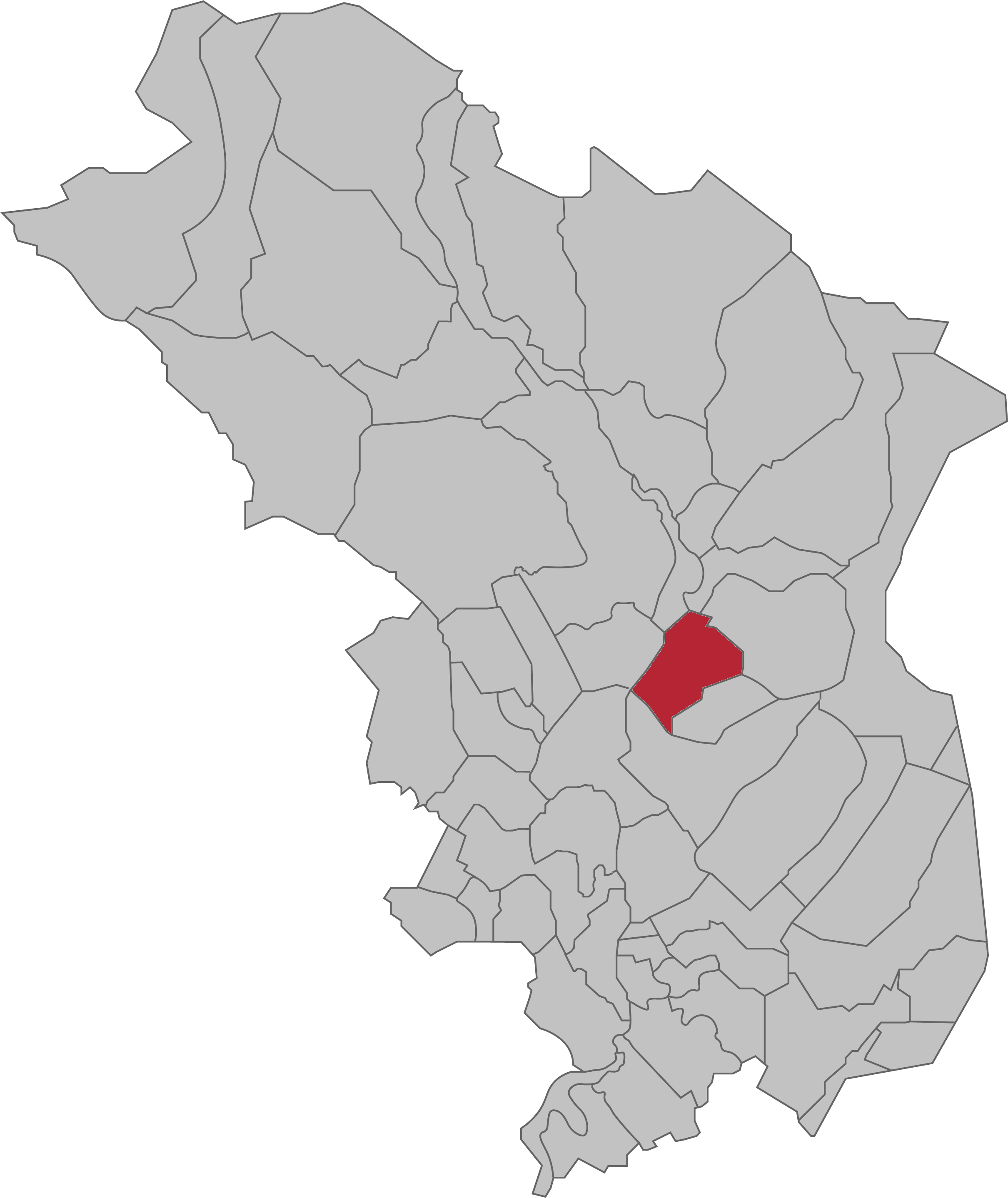
The location of Vrapčići within the City of Mostar.

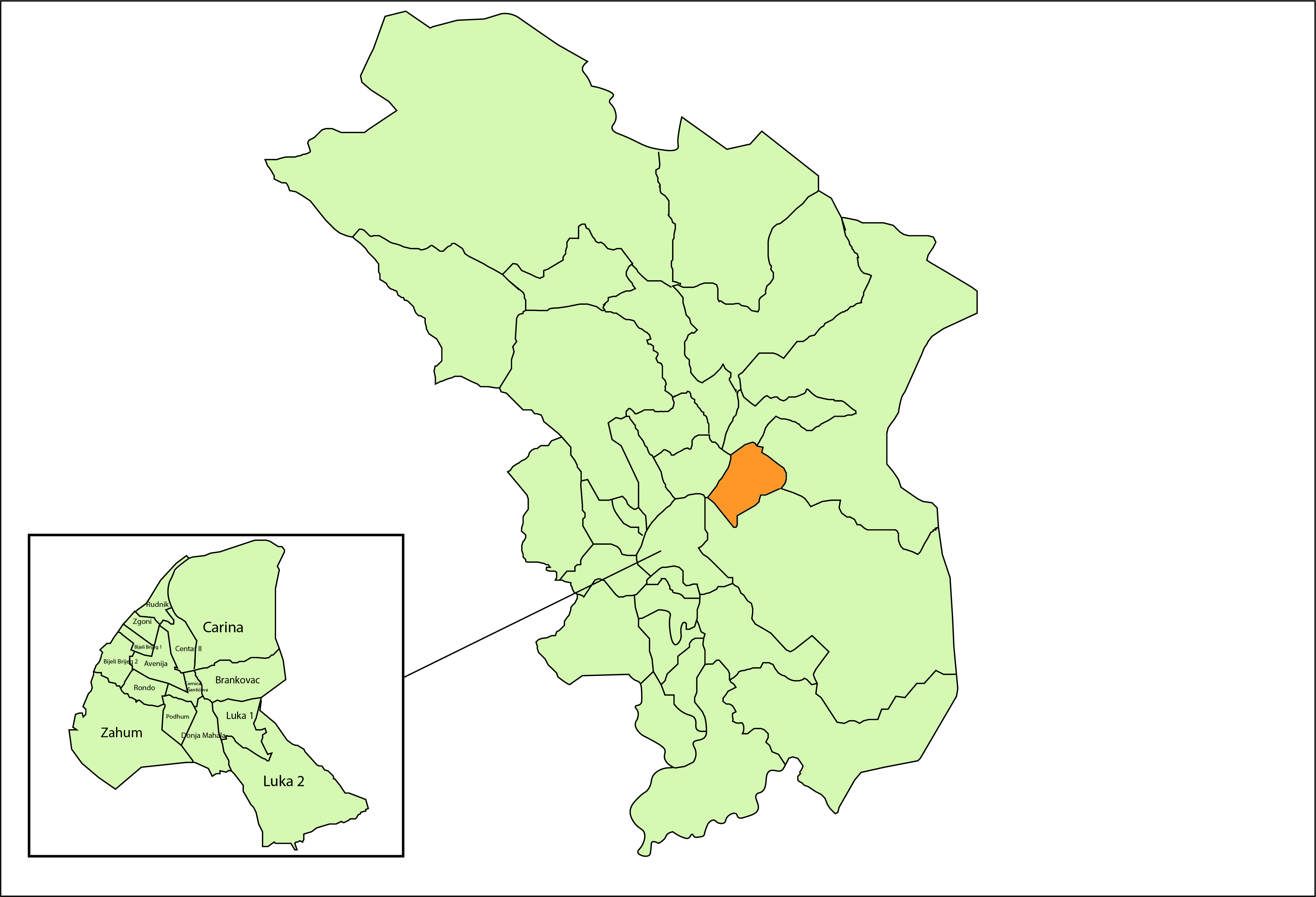
The local community of Vrapčići

Vrapčići is a suburban neighborhood in the City of Mostar, Bosnia and Herzegovina. It is part of the Northern metropolitan area.

According to the 2013 census, the population of Vrapčići was 3,266. The M-17 road goes right through Vrapčići and connects it with other northern suburbs and the city neighborhood of Zalik. The river Neretva forms the border to Raštani in the west, whereas it borders to Kuti, Livač and the Podveležje village of Dobrč to the east.

This part of the city is home of the FK Velež Mostar soccer club. Besides its Rođeni stadium, other important landmarks are the White Mosque and the Sutina cemetery. The suburb is also famous for its weekend-market, which attracts vendors and buyers from all over Bosnia and even other countries in the region.

== Geography ==
Just as most of the other northern part of the greater Mostar area, Vrapčići are located in the Bijelo polje (eng. for White Field). The Bijelo polje is one of the three valleys (the Bijelo polje, the Mostar valley and the Bišće polje in the south) which make up the territory of the city of Mostar and its surroundings. Flat and fertile land dominates in Vrapčići, due to its proximity to the Neretva river.

The Neretva forms the western border of the settlement. In this very part of its course, the Neretva's width is significantly enlarged, forming the Mostarsko jezero (eng. Mostar sea). The sea is an accumulation that was formed during the building of the Mostar hydroelectric power plant in the 1980s.

On the western bank of the river, the suburb of Raštani is located. Further, Vrapčići border Potoci in the north, the city neighborhood of Zalik in the south, to Kuti and Livač in the northeast, whereas the Podveležje village of Dobrč is located east.

== History ==
There are two historic landmarks in Vrapčići which date from the Ottoman period, the Džabić house (Džabića kuća) in Suhi do and the Alajbegović house (Alajbegovića kuća). They were built in 1801 and a couple of years after the occupation of Bosnia and Herzegovina by Austria-Hungary, respectively. Although they are listed as national monuments, their reconstruction still hasn't taken place (as of December 2022).

The history of Vrapčići during socialist Yugoslavia is tightly connected to the "Đuro Salaj" textile combine. Built in the 1950s, it became the biggest cotton mill in the Balkans, with over 6 thousand employees. The flourishing development of the factory was followed by a boom in the neighborhood around it, as new houses and residential areas for the workers were built, alongside appropriate public infrastructure. Despite the factory itself not suffering any greater damage, the production was not reestablished after the Bosnian war. The factory is seen as a victim of misguided privatization policies in the Bosnian transition era.

During the course of the Bosnian war (1992–1995), Vrapčići often changed sites.

First, with aid of the local serb population, the suburb came under control of the Yugoslav people's army (JNA) in April 1992. Later, the JNA handed over its positions to the Army of Republika Srpska (VRS), the armed forces of the Bosnian Serbs and their secessionist leadership. By ruling over Vrapčići and the other northern parts of the greater Mostar area, the Serb leadership aimed to block the route between Mostar and Sarajevo, setting the Bosnian-Croat controlled part of the city under a blockade.

The Serbs lost Vrapčići in June 1992, when joined Bosnian-Croat forces managed to retain control over Mostar and most of its surroundings in the Operation June Dawns. During its withdrawal, the VRS and local Serb paramilitary forces committed the Uborak and Sutina massacre, in which 114 non-Serb civilians were killed as an act of revenge. They brought most of the bodies later to the Uborak waste disposal site, located in Vrapčići.

After winning the Serbs, the northern suburbs were controlled by the Croat Defense Council (HVO) and the 4. corps of the Bosnian Army (ARBiH). After the HVO attacked the ARBiH on the 9th of May 1993 and the Bosnian-Croat war in Mostar broke out, Vrapčići became part of the secessionist republic of Herzeg-Bosnia. Again, it was a means to blockade the city, this time the Bosnian-held eastern part of it. However, on June 30, 1993, the Bosnian Army launched a successful operation to deblocade Mostar, liberating Vrapčići and most of the rest of the Bijelo polje.

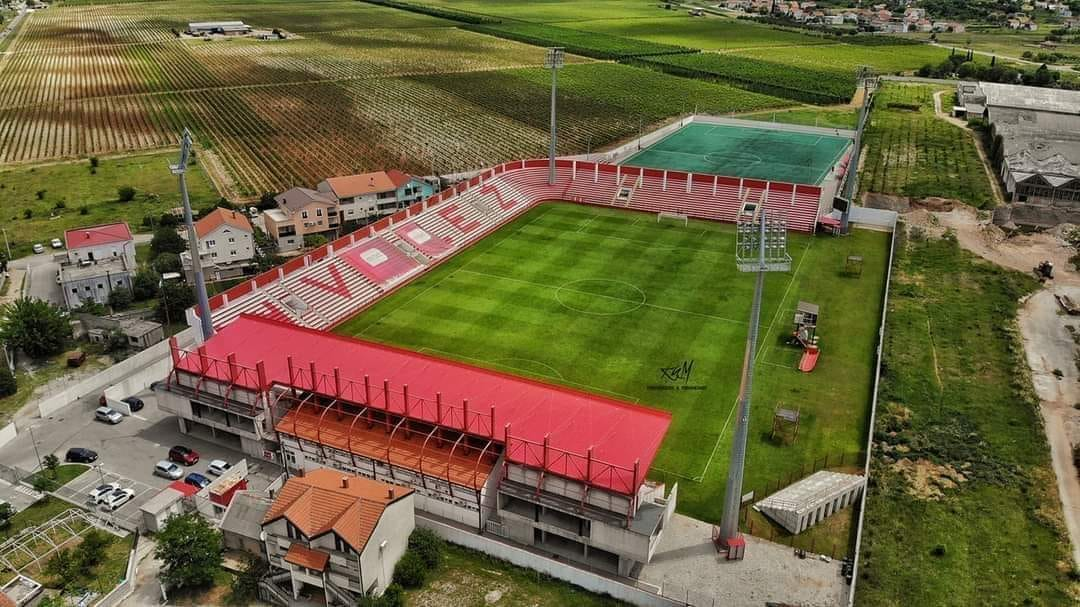
The Rođeni Stadium of FK Velež Mostar

After the Croat authorities in West Mostar forbade the Velež soccer club from keeping on playing at its stadium in Bijeli Brijeg (a neighborhood under HVO control) in 1993, Velež relocated to the Vrapčići stadium of FK Lokomotiva Mostar.

The war also had an impact on the local demographics. A lot of Bosniak refugees from Serb-held towns in Eastern Herzegovina and the Podveležje region moved to Vrapčići, which led to a Bosniak majority in the suburb.

== Demographics ==
=== 2013 ===
3,266 total

- Bosniaks - 2,838 (86.9%)
- Croats - 204 (6.2%)
- Serbs - 153 (4.7%)
- others - 71 (2.2%)

== Economy ==
The business zone "Gajevi" is located along the M-17 road in Vrapčići, with a lot of industrial, retail and agricultural companies. Outside the business zone there is also a considerable number of enterprises, mainly from the retail sector (especially furniture).

A great part of the population works in agriculture, benefiting from the fertile and flat land in Vrapčići.

The communal waste deposit site Uborak also has its headquarters here, but its further destiny is uncertain amid concerns from local NGOs and the abolishment of its environmental permit (status: 27 December 2022).

== Infrastructure ==
=== Transport infrastructure and public transport ===
The M-17 road, which connects Sarajevo with Mostar and the Neretva valley, goes right through the northern Mostar suburb.

The railway Sarajevo-Ploče goes along the west bank of the Neretva in this very part of its course, so the nearest train station is in the nearby Raštani. The Mostar central station is about five kilometers away. From there, express trains towards Sarajevo (e.g. the northern part of the country) and Čapljina depart, as well as long-distance buses towards all other major Bosnian cities and abroad.

Mostarbus, the local bus company, maintains several bus routes (lines 16, 20, 21, 22 and 23, as of December 2022) that connect Vrapčići with all parts of downtown, as well as the northern and southern suburbs.

=== Public facilities ===
In Vrapčići, there is one elementary school, a post office and an outpatient clinic of the Mostar Old Town Health Center (bos. Dom zdravlja "Stari Grad" Mostar).

There are also two cemeteries located there. The Sutina city cemetery, on the south entrance to Vrapčići, and the Orthodox cemetery Kraljevine.
