= Surjan =

Surjan can refer to:

- Rao Surjan Singh (1554–1584), king of Bundi, India
- Surjan Singh Bhandari (died 2004), Indian National Security Guards commando in the Akshardham Temple attack
- Surjan Singh Gill, Indo-Canadian terror suspect in the Air India Flight 182 bombing
- Jacob Surjan (born 1985), Australian rules footballer
- Surjan, Bosnia and Herzegovina, a village in Bosnia and Herzegovina
- Šurjan, a village in Serbia
