= Ugljevik coal mine =

Open-pit coal mine in Bosnia and Herzegovina

Ugljevik Coal Mine
- Location within Republika Srpska Location within Bosnia and Herzegovina
- Location: Ugljevik, Republika Srpska, Bosnia and Herzegovina; 44°39′49″N 18°59′05″E
- Products: Lignite
- Production: 1.75 million tonnes of coal (Annual capacity)
- Company: RiTE Ugljevik a.d.

The Ugljevik Coal Mine also known as Bogutovo Coal Mine (Bogutovo Selo) is an open-pit coal mine located near the town of Ugljevik, Republika Srpska, Bosnia and Herzegovina. It is owned and operated by RiTE Ugljevik.

The mine has coal reserves amounting to 336.1 million tonnes of lignite, one of the largest coal reserves in Europe and the world. The mine has an annual production capacity of 1.75 million tonnes of coal. The most of its coal is used for the electricity generation at Ugljevik Thermal Power Plant.

== Ownership ==
The mine is owned and operated by RiTE Ugljevik a.d. (short for: Rudnik i termoelektrana Ugljevik a.d.), an integrated coal mining and power generating company, which is 65% owned by the Government of Republika Srpska.
