= Ugljevik Thermal Power Plant =

Coal-fired power plant in Bosnia and Herzegovina

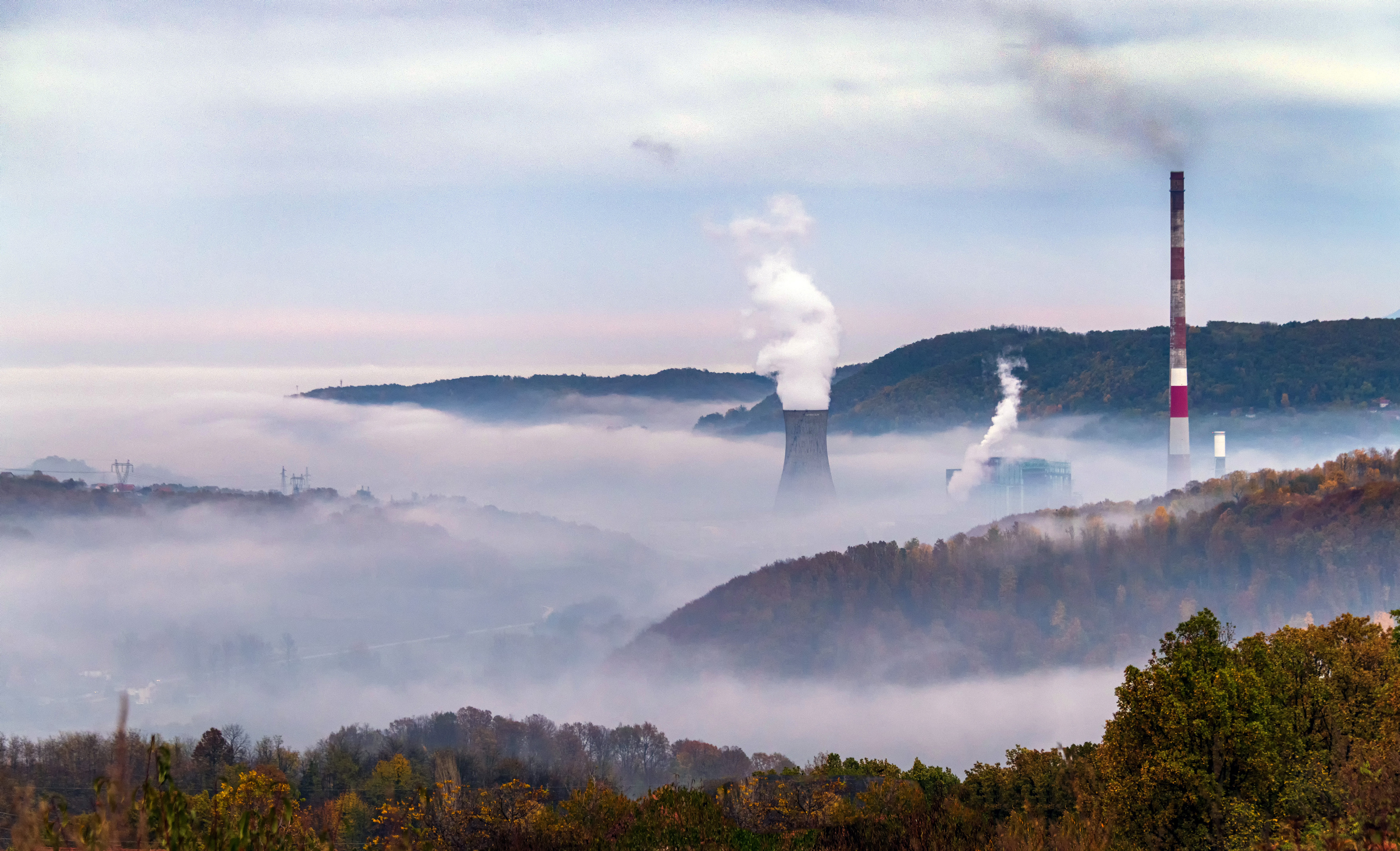
- View on Ugljevik Thermal Power Plant from the nearby hill during the foggy morning
- Official name: Термоелектрана "Угљевик"
- Country: Bosnia and Herzegovina
- Location: Ugljevik
- Coordinates: 44°40′55″N 18°58′2″E
- Status: Operational
- Construction began: 1976
- Commission date: 1985
- Owner: Elektroprivreda Republike Srpske (ERS)
- Operator: RiTE Ugljevik a.d.

Thermal power station
- Primary fuel: Coal
- Cogeneration?: Yes

Power generation
- Units operational: 1
- Make and model: LMZ; Electrosila; Končar
- Nameplate capacity: 300 MW
- Annual net output: 1,329 GWh (2025)

The Ugljevik Thermal Power Plant (Serbian: Термоелектрана "Угљевик") is a thermal power plant located near Ugljevik, Republika Srpska, Bosnia and Herzegovina. It is owned and operated by RiTE Ugljevik. As of 2024, the power plant generated 1,329 GWh of electricity.

The power plant uses coal from the Ugljevik coal mine as fuel. As the water cooling source, it uses the nearby river of Janja; the other sources are Sniježnica Lake and Mezgrajica river.

== History ==
Ugljevik has been coal a mining area since 1899, and since 1985 it is involved in electricity generation when the power plant was commisioned.

The construction of the coal-fired power plant and new coal mine started in 1976 by Elektroprivreda Bosne i Hercegovine. In 1979, the Slovenian "SOZD Elektrogospodarstvo SR Slovenije" (EGS) joined the project and co-financed the construction. It financed 100 MW of the planned 300 MW generating capacity, together with the corresponding share of the coal mine, and co-investment agreement was signed in 1981. The construction was finished in 1985, when the first and only unit was commissioned; the total construction cost was estimated at $395 million (equivalent to $1.239 billion in 2026 US dollars). As the old Ugljevik mine was closed at the same time, the new mine located in Bogutovo Selo was opened, and the integrated coal-mining and power generating company RiTE Ugljevik was created on the base of Rudnik Ugljevik mining company.

The construction of the second unit started in 1985 and halted during the Bosnian War. During the war, the power plant was closed from April 1992 to November 1995, though the facilities and equipment were saved in expectation of resuming production.

In 2010, the power plant went through extensive upgrading; nevertheless, the power plant remained a major source of pollution for the whole region of northwest Bosnia and beyond.

During the 2020s, RiTE Ugljevik was involved in multiple arbitration proceedings and subsequent debt-settlement agreements, concerning the undelivered electrical energy to the Slovenian Elektrogospodarstvo Slovenije – razvoj in inženiring d.o.o. (EGS-RI), represented by Holding Slovenske elektrarne (HSE). In July 2023, EGS-RI was awarded with 67 millions euros in principal compensation covering the period from June 2011 to December 2021. In October 2023, the additional 58 million euros in accrued interest was awarded to EGS-RI. On 30 January 2024, EGS-RI, HSE, RiTE Ugljevik and Elektroprivreda Republike Srpske (ERS) signed agreements providing for the resumption of electricity deliveries to Slovenia and principal repayment of 67 million euros; the deliveries of approximately 500 GWh annually, corresponding to one-third of the electricity generated by the plant, resumed on 1 February 2024..

On 27 December 2024, RiTE Ugljevik, EGS-RI and ERS concluded an agreement recognizing and settling a further 65.2 million euros in debt for undelivered electricity covering the period from January 2022 to January 2024. And finally, in April 2026, the sides concluded the final settlement agreement, covering the remaining outstanding debt of 37.4 million euros and accrued interest. As RiTE Ugljevik is indebted company that is even struggling to mine coal, ERS and the Government of Republika Srpska had to guarantee for it and the settlement provided for repayment in quarterly instalments through 2031. The combined nominal value of the agreements concerning cash compensation and electricity deliveries exceeded 230 million euros.

In October 2026 and again in November 2026, the power plant was temporarily shut down as it lacked the coal for the electricity generation.

== Gallery ==
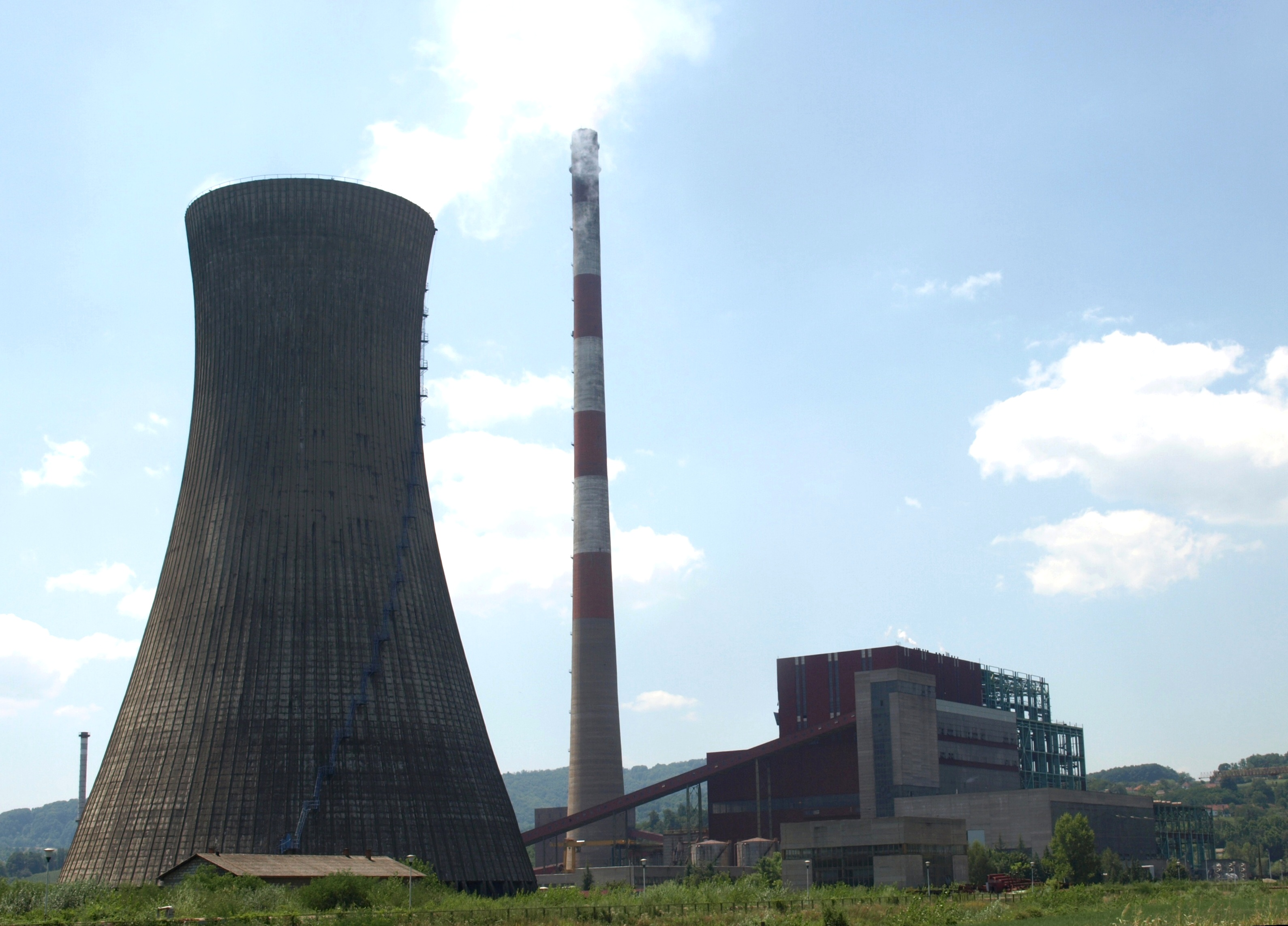
View on Ugljevik Power Plant, July 2008

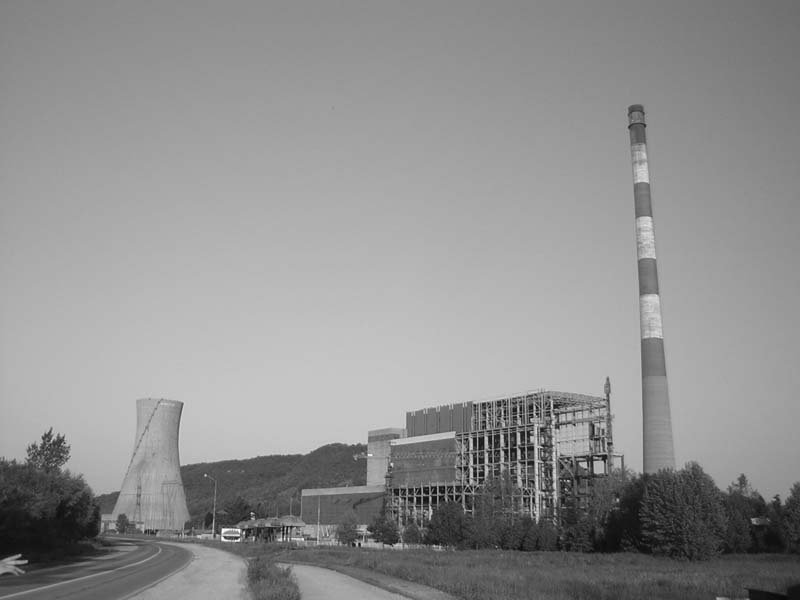
Ugljevik Thermal Power Plant (grayscale)

View on Ugljevik Thermal Power Plant from the nearby hill at night

== Description ==
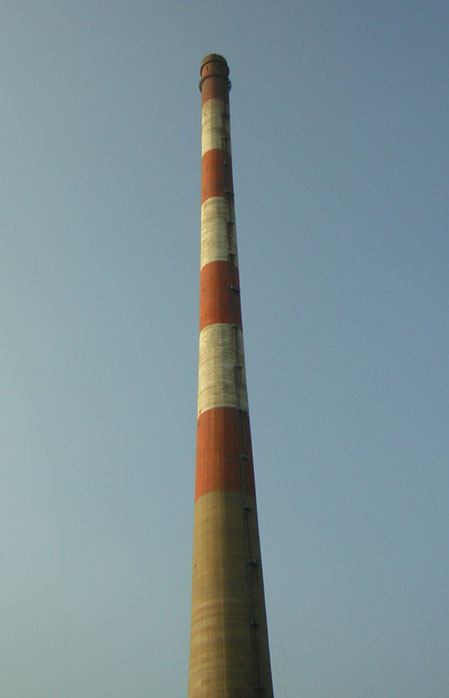
Flue gas stack of the Ugljevik Thermal Power Plant

The Ugljevik Thermal Power Plant is now one of the largest generators of electricity in Republika Srpska. It has a combined heat and power generation unit with an installed capacity of 300 MW. In 2009, it generated 1,559 GWh of electricity and consumed 1.3 million tonnes of coal.

The power plant has a 310-metre (1,020 ft) tall flue gas stack, the tallest structure in Bosnia and Herzegovina. Before the Bosnian War on the top of chimney with big white letters was written 'TITO', in memory of communist leader of former Yugoslavia Josip Broz Tito. During the war text was rewritten, so now is visible a Serbian symbol, the Serbian cross.

The company plans to open a new coal mine, Ugljevik-Istok. Some investors have shown interest in building a second unit with capacity of 600 MW of electricity.

The power plant is also infamously known as a one-of-a-kind polluter: it emits large amounts of dangerous sulphur dioxide compared to its relatively limited power generation capacity, and, as of April 2019, there was still no operational flue gas desulfurization unit. For this reason, the Uglevik power plant is also sometimes seen as a "Chernobyl of Europe".

== Ownership ==
The power plant is owned and operated by RiTE Ugljevik a.d. (short for: Rudnik i termoelektrana Ugljevik a.d.), an integrated coal mining and power generating company, which is 65% owned by the Government of Republika Srpska.

== See also ==
- List of power stations in Bosnia and Herzegovina
- List of tallest structures in the world
- List of tallest buildings and structures in the world by country
