= Zabrđe (Ugljevik) =

Coordinates: 44°42′24″N 18°59′33″E

Zabrđe Забрђе
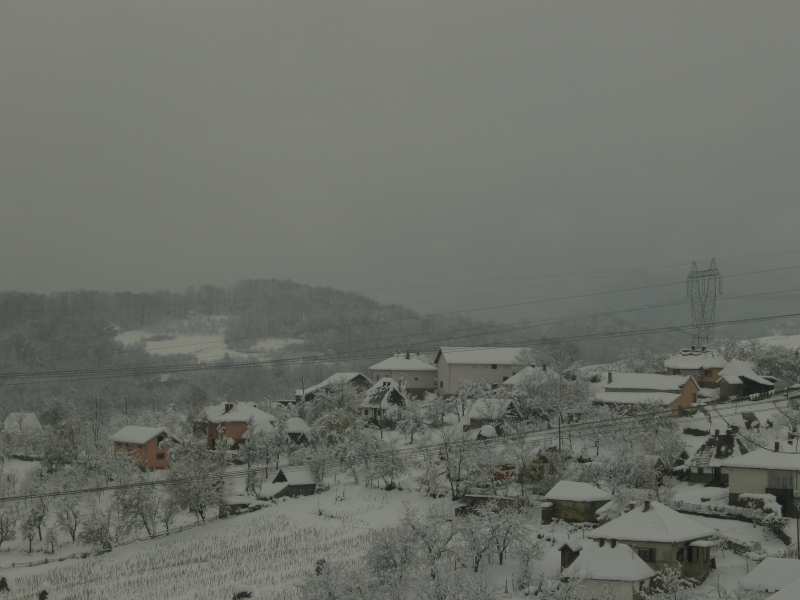
Location	Ugljevik, Republika Srpska
Population – (est.) – (1991 census)
Area code	+387 55
Time zone	CET (UTC +1); CEST (UTC +2)
Website

Zabrđe (Serbian Cyrillic: Забрђе) is a village located in the Ugljevik municipality in Republika Srpska, Bosnia and Herzegovina.

== Population ==
=== Ethnic composition, 1991 census ===
At the 1991 census, the total population was 1,725. There were 1,706 Serbs (98.89%), 7 "Yugoslavs" (0.40%), 2 Croats (0.11%), and 10 (0.57%) who were either of other or unknown origin.
