= Gacko Thermal Power Plant =

Coal-fired power plant in Bosnia and Herzegovina

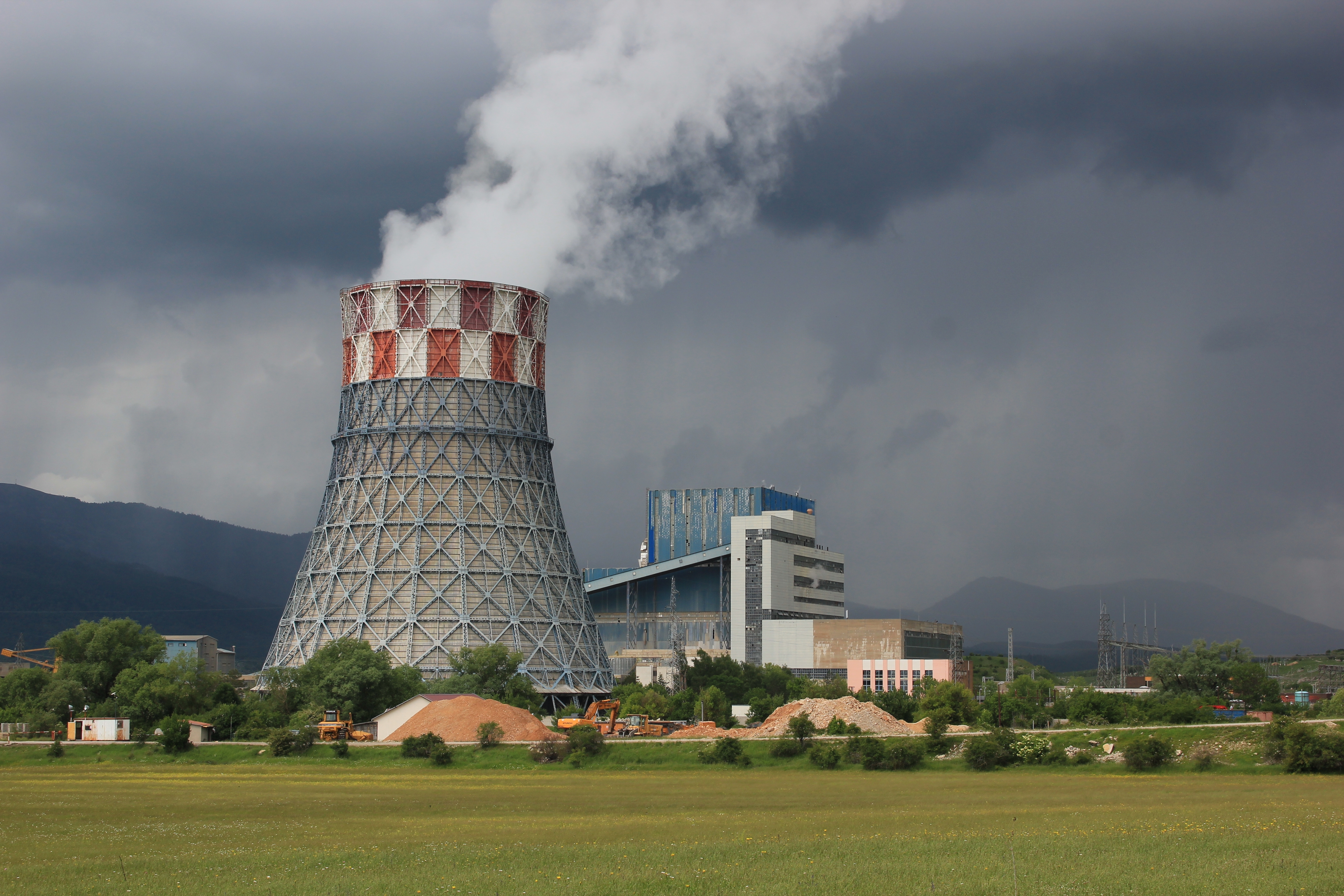
- View on Gacko Thermal Power Plant, May 2018
- Official name: Термоелектрана "Гацко"
- Country: Bosnia and Herzegovina
- Location: Gacko
- Coordinates: 43°10′26″N 18°30′59″E
- Status: Operational
- Commission date: 1983
- Owner: Elektroprivreda Republike Srpske
- Operator: RiTE Gacko a.d.

Thermal power station
- Primary fuel: Coal

Power generation
- Units operational: 1
- Nameplate capacity: 300 MW (2025)
- Annual net output: 1,274 GWh (2025)

External links
- Website: www.ritegacko.com/termoelektrana/
- Commons: Related media on Commons

The Gacko Thermal Power Plant (Serbian: Термоелектрана "Гацко") is a thermal power plant located near Gacko, Republika Srpska, Bosnia and Herzegovina. It is owned and operated by RiTE Gacko. As of 2024, the power plant generated 1,274 GWh of electricity.

The power plant uses coal from the Gacko coal mine as fuel. As the water cooling source, it uses the nearby Vrba Lake (upper reservoir) and Klinje Lake (lower lake, into which the water spills from the dam on Vrba Lake); both lakes were formed by damming of river Mušnica.

== Gallery ==
View on the Gacko Thermal Power Plant from the nearby hill

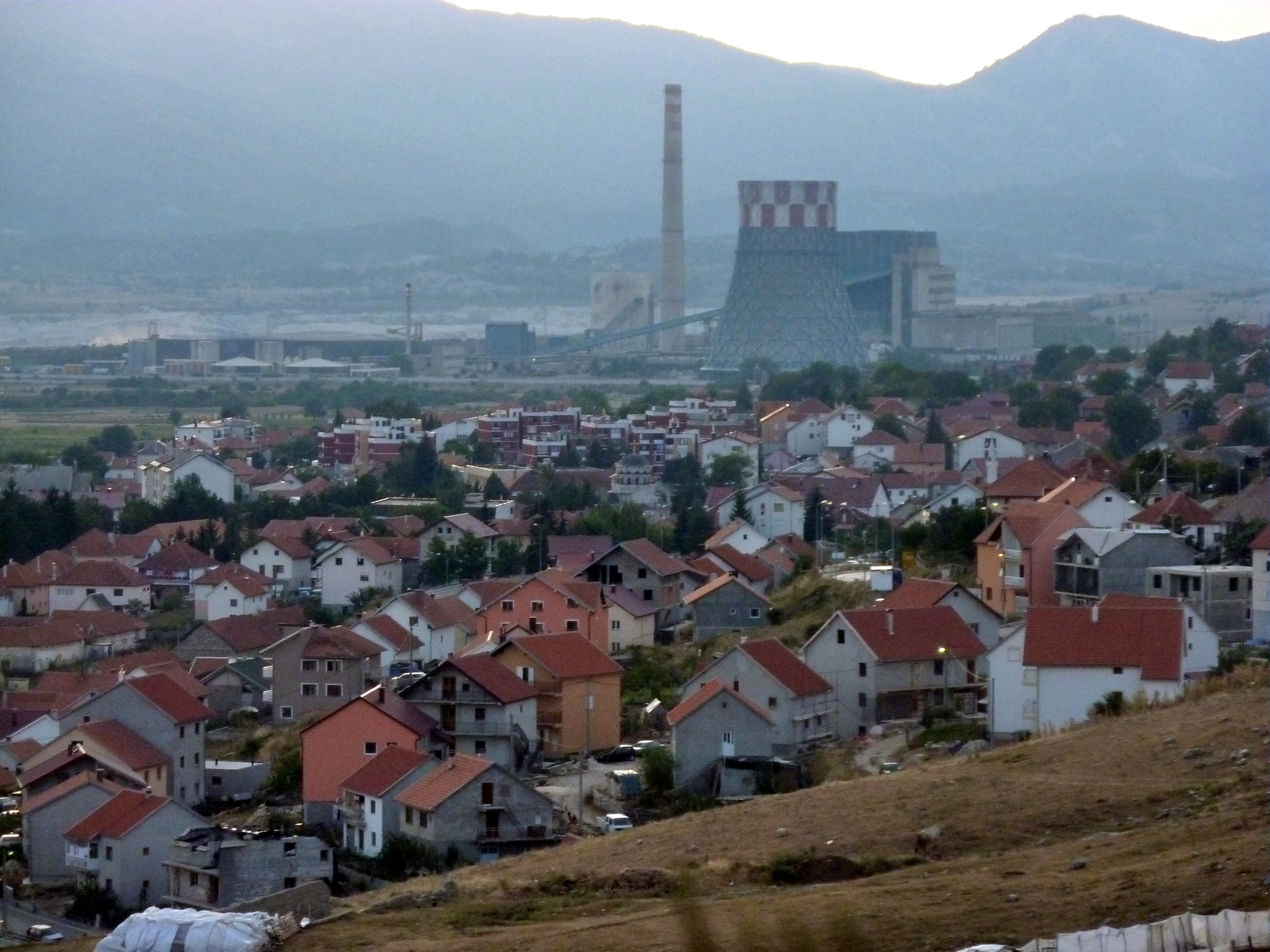
View on the Gacko Thermal Power Plant from the town

== See also ==
- List of power stations in Bosnia and Herzegovina
