= Bočac Lake =

Bocac Lake
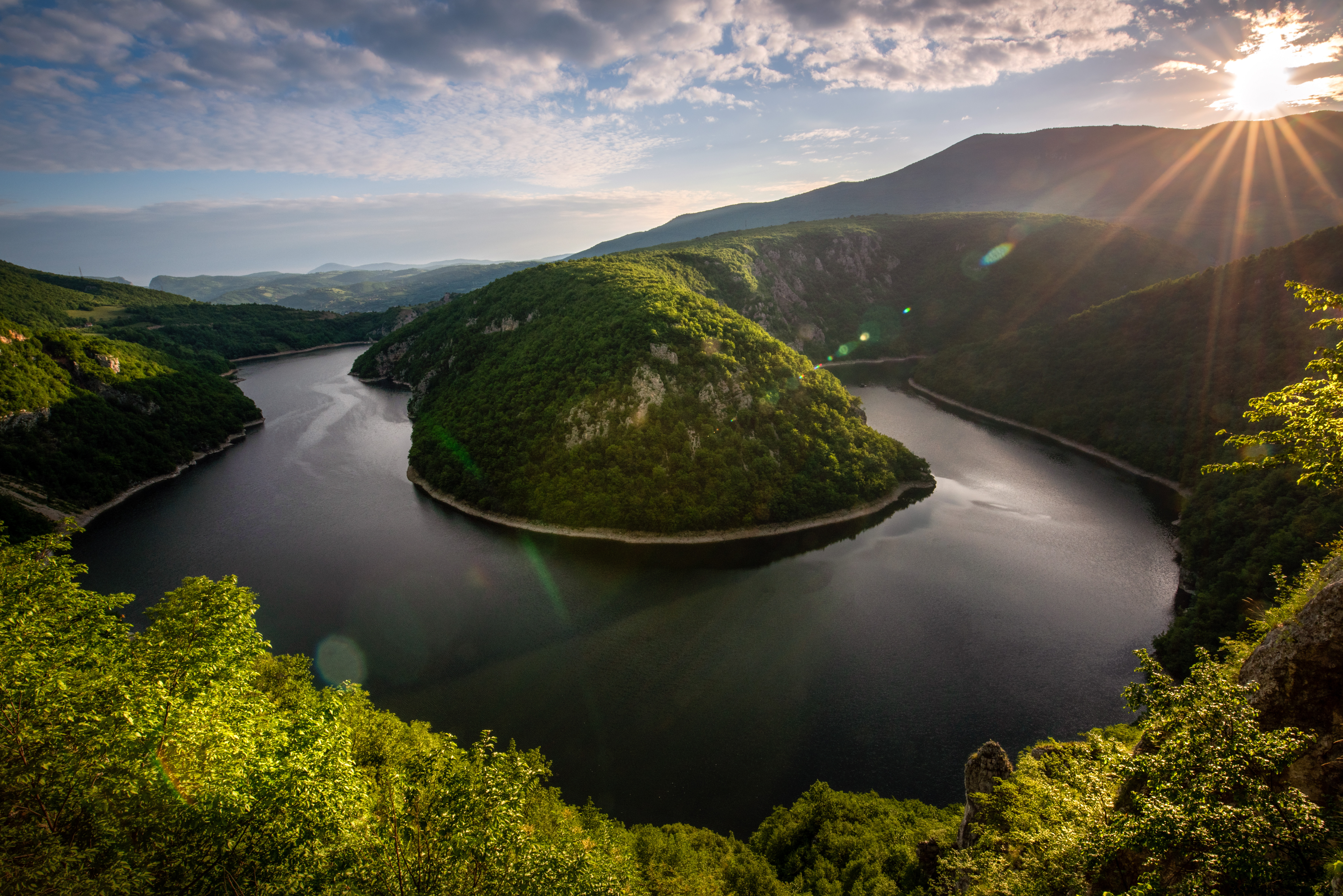
- Lake Bočac

- Location within Bosnia and Herzegovina
- Interactive map of Bocac Lake
- Coordinates: 44°30′7.6″N 17°9′16.9″E
- Type: artificial freshwater lake
- Primary inflows: Vrbas (river)
- Primary outflows: Vrbas (river)
- Basin countries: Bosnia and Herzegovina
- Max. length: 1,800 feet (550 m)
- Max. width: 650 feet (200 m)
- Islands: numerous islets and shifting sandbars

Bočac Lake is an artificial lake of Republika Srpska, Bosnia and Herzegovina. It is located in the municipality of Mrkonjic Grad. The lake is water reservoir for the Bočac Hydroelectrical Power Station.

== See also ==
- List of lakes in Bosnia and Herzegovina
