= Gacko coal mine =

Open-pit coal mine in Bosnia and Herzegovina

Gacko Coal Mine
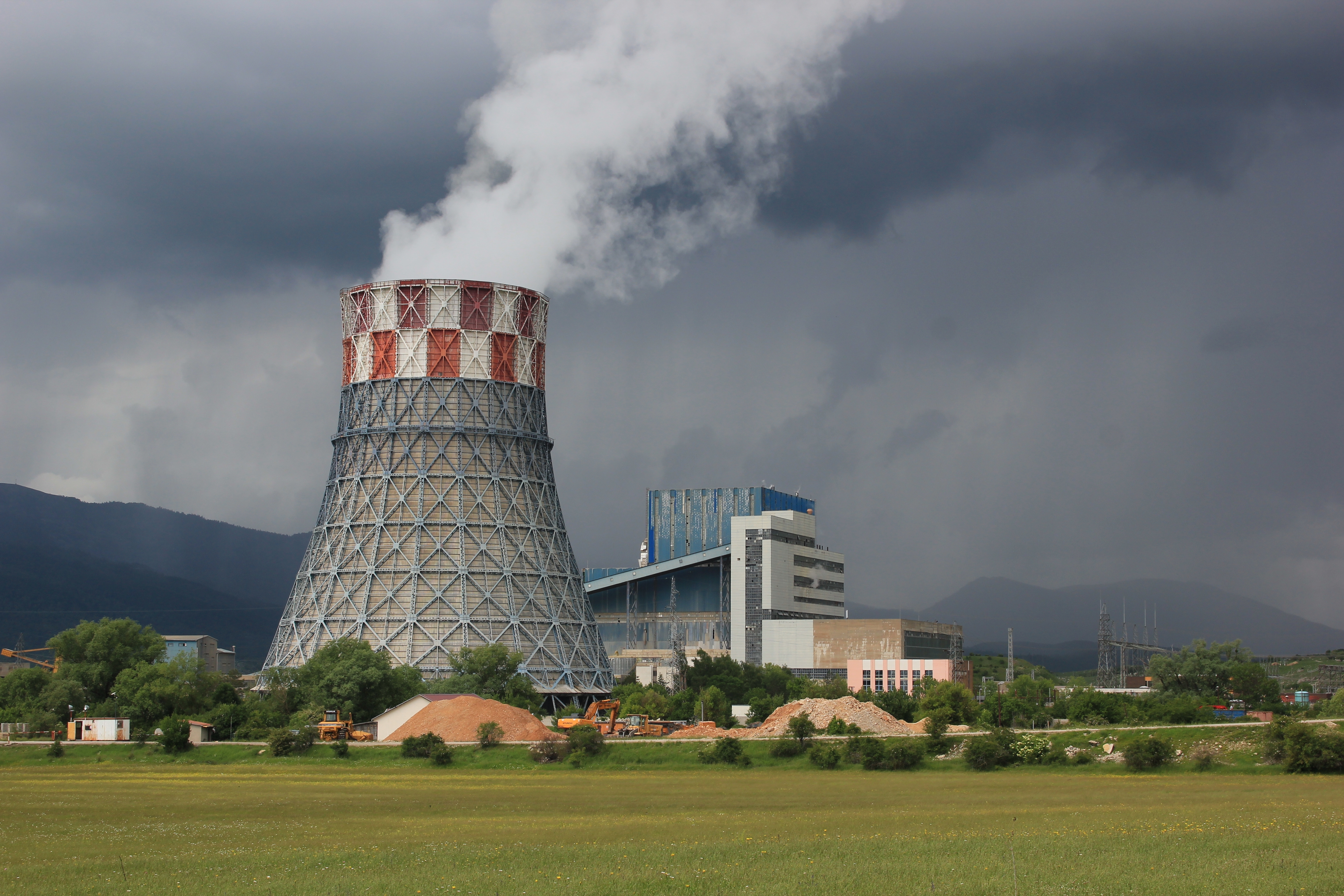
- View on Gacko Thermal Power Plant (which uses the coal produced in mine), May 2018

- Location within Republika Srpska Location within Bosnia and Herzegovina
- Location: Gacko, Gacko municipality, 89240, Republika Srpska, Bosnia and Herzegovina; 43°10′22″N 18°30′47″E
- Products: Lignite
- Production: 2.10 million tonnes of coal (Annual capacity)
- Opened: 1954; 72 years ago
- Company: RiTE Gacko a.d.

The Gacko Coal Mine is a coal mine located near the town of Gacko, Republika Srpska, Bosnia and Herzegovina. It is owned and operated by RiTE Gacko.

The mine has coal reserves amounting to 372.2 million tonnes of lignite, one of the largest coal reserves in Europe and the world. The mine has an annual production capacity of 2.10 million tonnes of coal. The most of its coal is used for the electricity generation at Gacko Thermal Power Plant.

== Ownership ==
The mine is owned and operated by RiTE Gacko a.d. (short for: Rudnik i termoelektrana Gacko a.d.), an integrated coal mining and power generating company, which is 65% owned by the Government of Republika Srpska.
