= Kostela =

- Village
- Location within Bosnia and Herzegovina
- Coordinates: 44°52′37″N 15°54′00″E
- Country: Bosnia and Herzegovina
- Entity: Federation of Bosnia and Herzegovina
- Canton: Una-Sana
- Municipality: Bihać

Area
  - Total: 3.27 sq mi (8.46 km^{2})

Population (2013)
  - Total: 980
  - Density: 300/sq mi (120/km^{2})
- Time zone: UTC+1 (CET)
  - Summer (DST): UTC+2 (CEST)

Kostela (Kastel) is a settlement and tourist resort next to the River Una in the municipality of Bihać in Bosnia and Herzegovina. It borders Pokoj and Srbljani.

== History ==
=== Name and origin ===
The etymology of the word Kostela has it roots in ancient Illyria, Iapodes and the Roman castellum.

Kastel or kȁstrum (lat .: castrum, Eng .: castle) is the name of an ancient fort and established a military settlement; camp; especially along the lines of the defensive limes. The original meaning of the term comes from the Roman era, from a legion camp surrounded by ramparts and towers, which was built according to certain rules – the Roman castrum. In the mature antique era, castras are particularly important in the defense system.

=== Illyrian and Roman period ===
The Romans divided the Illyric province into the provinces of Pannonia and Dalmatia, which belonged to the almost entire Iapodian country, where they were in the 1st century BC. some smaller military units were deployed: one unit of Ala Claudia Nova was in Golubić near Bihac around 70 years of new era, and a smaller patrol was in the Kostela at the ending of the river Una from the Bihac field, probably at a place suitable for the passage (in the name of the settlement, the memory was preserved to the Roman castle).

=== Mythology ===
The origins of this Bihać settlement are mostly related to two legends: the one about the king of aquatic creatures and those about the slaves who have lost their lives in digging a hill to make a flow for the river.

Several miles downstream of Bihać is the village of Kostela, which, according to folk tales, has always been the most beautiful settlement next to river Una. Many legends are linked to its creation, and the ones that are saved are those about aquatic creatures and the penetration of the canyon.

The people recounted that once there was a large lake in the area of today's Bihac and there were aquatic creatures in it. There was hostility between them and the people, and the king of the aquatic creatures wanted to bring people down to themselves. But the people were smarter and more resourceful, and they dug through the canyon through which the lake collapsed, leaving only the river – today's Una. All the watery creatures died, only their king who was hiding in the Una was left alone, and later they defeated him too.

The folk tales from Kostela say that long time ago whole Bihać was under the water and people one day decided to dig a hill on border between Pokoj and Kostela, and by that to make a flow for the river and to settle in the valley of Bihać. When they finished digging a large wave of wild river Una soak in people and took most of them. After that, when the river has calmed down people found bones of drowned diggers in Kostela.

Explanation: in Bosnian lang. Kost=Bone in English.

=== Recent history ===
The settlement is known for its mills, many stories and legends. The legend says the locals from the Spahići settlement, located above Kostela, descended to the plain, because their homes were burned in World War II. When the war ended, people had nowhere to go, so they settled down the river Una. On the river, they built the mills and survived working as millers. After World War II Kostela was one of the most important places in town Bihać because of innovators who made many waterworks facilities like sawmills, and mills in which people from other cities came to grind flour. And later in war that was in period of 1991–1995, settlement Kostela was again the most important place in Bihać because of hydroelectric power station Hidroelektrana Una Kostela that delivered electricity in important institutes like: hospitals, military barracks...etc. and with that saved many lives.
