= Kutilivač =

- Village
- Location within Bosnia and Herzegovina
- Coordinates: 43.3946881°N 17.888025°E
- Country: Bosnia and Herzegovina
- Entity: Federation of Bosnia and Herzegovina
- Canton: Herzegovina-Neretva
- Municipality: City of Mostar

Area
  - Total: 9.88 sq mi (25.58 km^{2})

Population (2013)
  - Total: 1,624
  - Density: 164.4/sq mi (63.49/km^{2})
- Time zone: UTC+1 (CET)
  - Summer (DST): UTC+2 (CEST)

Kutilivač is a village in the City of Mostar, Bosnia and Herzegovina.

== Demographics ==
According to the 2013 census, its population was 1,624.

Ethnicity in 2013
Ethnicity	Number	Percentage
Bosniaks	1,318	81.2%
Croats	270	16.6%
Serbs	16	1.0%
other/undeclared	20	1.2%
Total	1,624	100%
