= Višegrad Hydroelectric Power Station =

Visegrad Hydro Power Plant
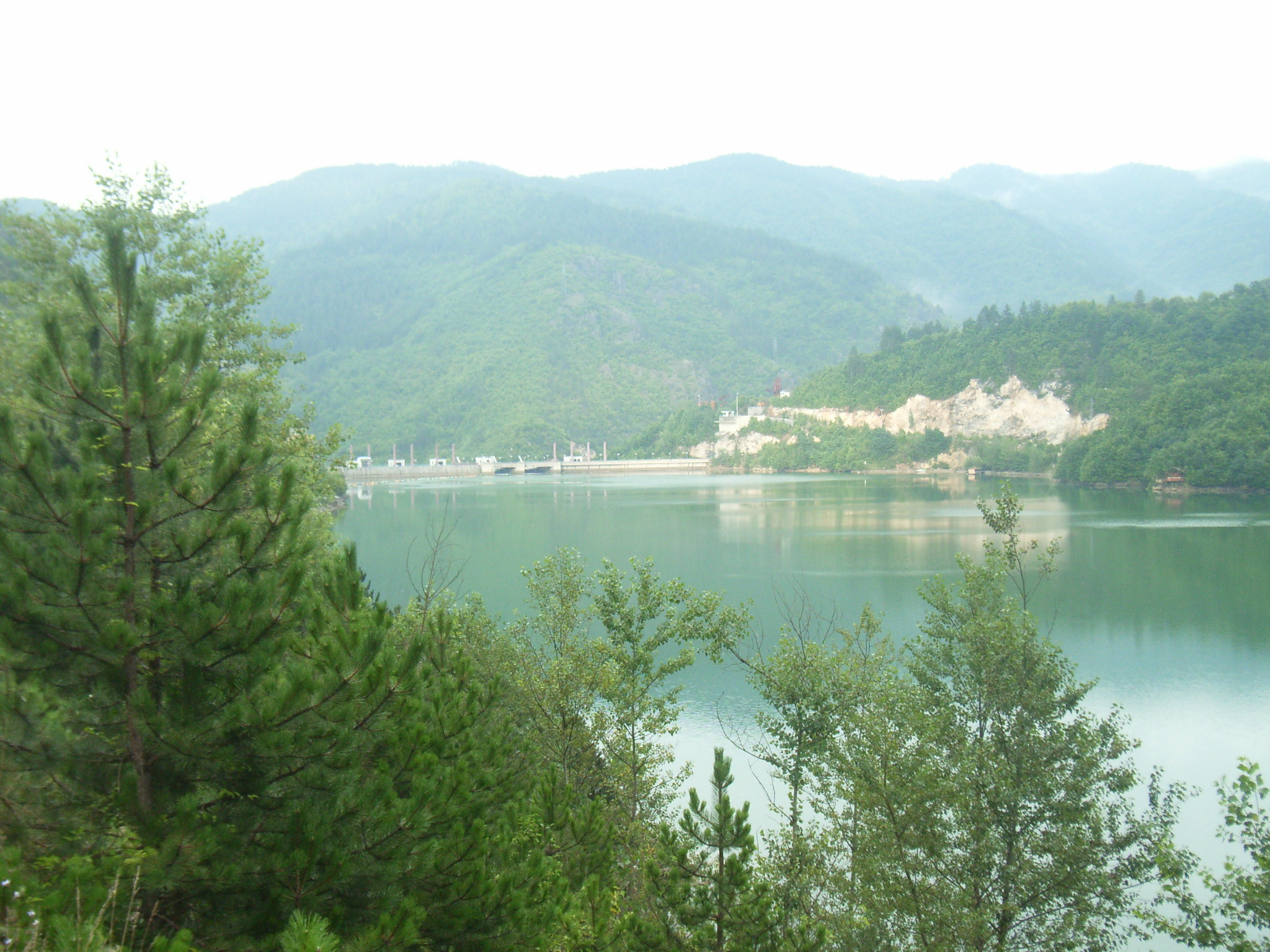
- Višegrad Hydroelectric Power Station

- Location within Bosnia and Herzegovina
- Interactive map of Visegrad Hydro Power Plant
- Location: Višegrad
- Coordinates: 43.760633°N 19.289518°E
- Purpose: Electricity generation
- Status: Operational

Dam and spillways
- Type of dam: Gravity dam
- Impounds: Drina

Višegrad Hydroelectric Power Plant
- Commission date: 1989
- Type: run-of-the-river
- Turbines: Francis
- Installed capacity: 315 MW
- Annual generation: 1 TWh

The Višegrad Hydroelectric Power Plant is a hydroelectric power plant in Bosnia and Herzegovina. It began electrical energy generation in 1989. The installed capacity of 3×105 MW is achieved with Kaplan turbines, with an average annual electricity generation of 1 TWh. The main contractor (for the construction works) was Hidrogradnja of Sarajevo.

== See also ==
- List of power stations in Bosnia-Herzegovina
