= Bočac Hydroelectric Power Station =

Dam in Bočac, Bosnia and Herzegovina

Bočac Hydro Power Plant
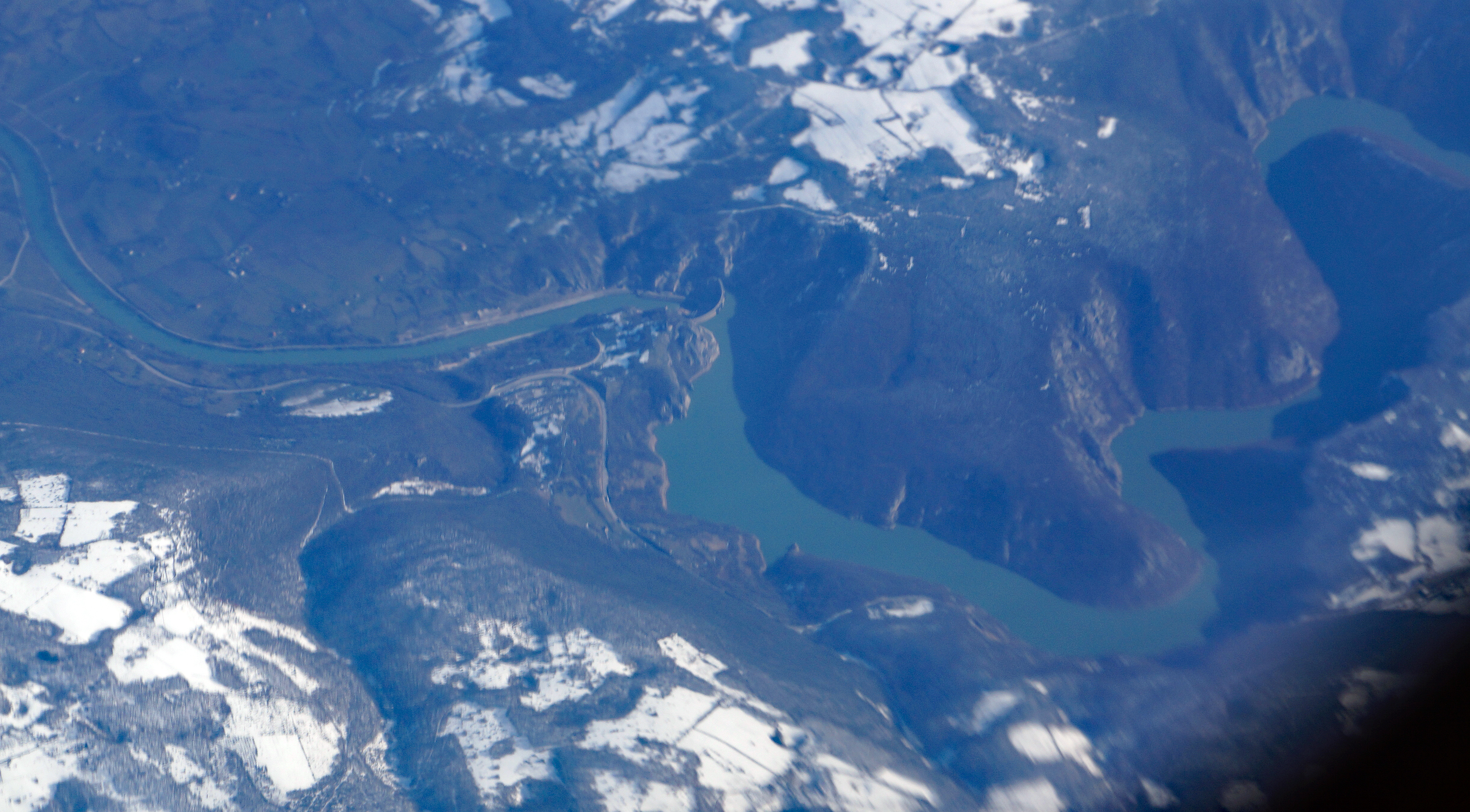
- Aerial view of the dam from the West

- Location within Bosnia and Herzegovina
- Interactive map of Bočac Hydro Power Plant
- Location: Bočac
- Coordinates: 44.507652°N 17.161787°E
- Purpose: Electricity generation
- Status: Operational
- Owner: Government of Republika Srpska

Dam and spillways
- Type of dam: Arch–gravity dam
- Height: 66 m (217 ft)

Reservoir
- Creates: Lake Bočac

Power Station
- Type: Conventional/impoundment
- Installed capacity: 110 MW

The Bočac Hydro Power Plant is one of Bosnia and Herzegovina's largest hydro power plant having an installed electric capacity of 110 MW. The power plant gets its water from artificial lake (reservoir) formed on the Vrbas river, the Bočac Lake.

== See also ==
- List of power stations in Bosnia-Herzegovina
