= Ugljevik =

Ugljevik Угљевик
- Town and municipality
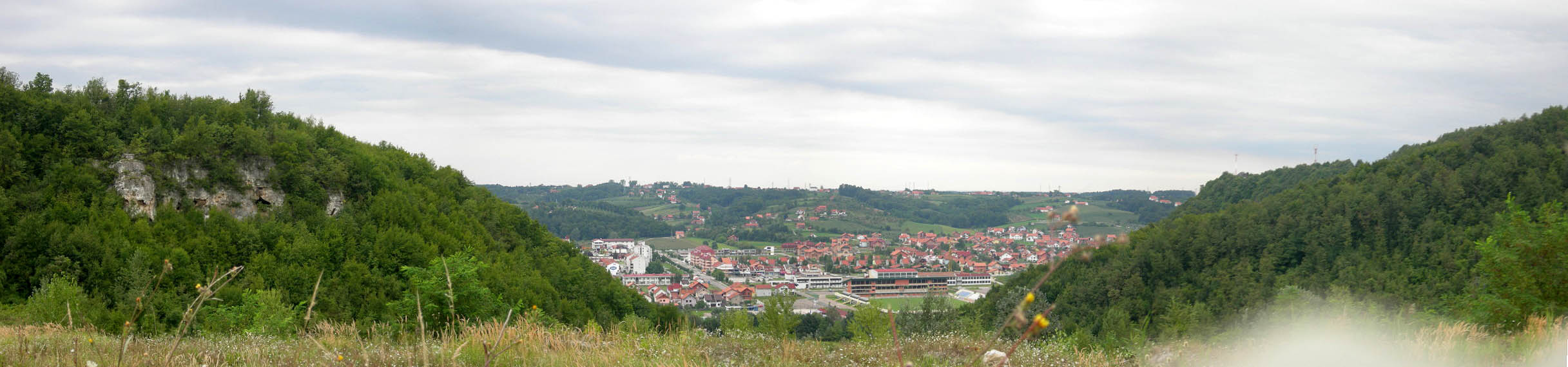
- Ugljevik

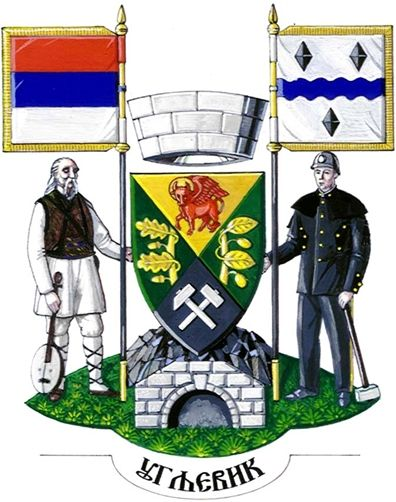
- Coat of arms

- Location of Ugljevik within Republika Srpska

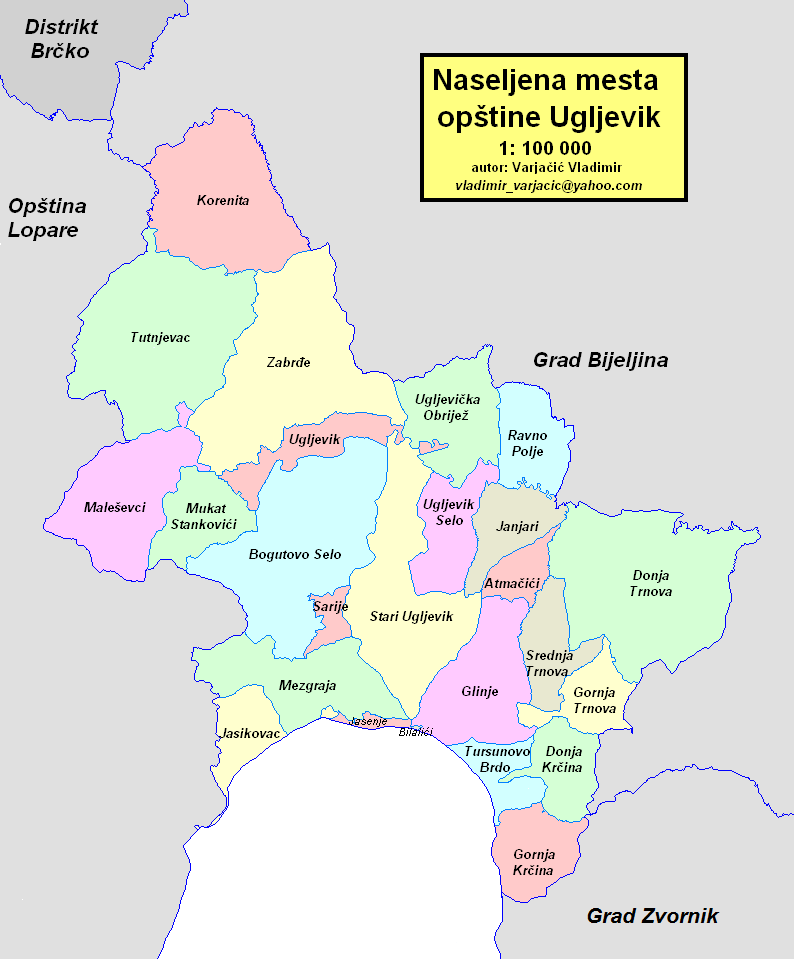
- Coordinates: 44°41′36″N 18°59′40″E
- Country: Bosnia and Herzegovina
- Entity: Republika Srpska
- Geographical region: Semberija

Government
  - Municipal mayor: Dragan Gajić (SNSD)
  - Municipality: 165.2 km^{2} (63.8 sq mi)

Population (2013 census)
  - Town: 4,155
  - Municipality: 15,710
  - Municipality density: 95.10/km^{2} (246.3/sq mi)
- Time zone: UTC+1 (CET)
  - Summer (DST): UTC+2 (CEST)
- Postal Code: 76330
- Area code: (+387) 55
- Website: www.opstinaugljevik.net

Ugljevik (Serbian Cyrillic: Угљевик) is a town and municipality in Republika Srpska, Bosnia and Herzegovina. As of 2013, the municipality has a population of 15,710 inhabitants, while the town of Ugljevik has a population of 4,155 inhabitants.

The municipality is located in the countryside of the eastern foothills of Mount Majevica, where the mountains start descending towards the flatlands of Semberija, to which it is tied to more than any other surrounding area. It is the home of miners and other energy resource professionals.

== Name ==
Ugljevik is named after coal (ugalj), which first began to be exploited on Mount Majevica in 1899.

== History ==
At least ten archaeological locations have been found in the area. These include five locations with groupings of medieval stone sarcophagi, called stećci, and three dating from the Roman period. Though research into the Neolithic sites in the municipality is lacking, nearby areas have Neolithic archaeological sites, allowing postulation that there might have been ancient sites present. The village of Tutnjevac contains the remains of a Roman villa.

The first population census of the region showed five settlements with a total of 55 houses, which date from prior to arrival of the Ottoman Turks in the 15th century. During troubled times the population would leave these parts with most of the succeeding population—the forebears of the present Majevicans—coming from Eastern and ‘Old’ Herzegovina in the 19th century.

During the past hundred years, the pace and extent of development of the Ugljevik region has been determined by coal production. With the increased need for coal, coal exploitation began in 1899, and a narrow gauge railway was built from Rača, on the Sava river, to the Ugljevik coal mine via Bijeljina in 1919. Subsequently, this railway was upgraded to a normal narrow gauge, and later was connected to one of Ugljevik’s communities, Mezgraja, in 1938. This was the last narrow gauge railway in Europe before it was closed on May 26, 1979.

The coal from Bogutovo Selo surface mine has a calorific value of 2,550 kcal/kg (10.68 MJ/kg), and it is estimated that the reserves are sufficient to satisfy the needs of four 300 megawatt coal-fired power plants.

These coal companies have driven the development of nearly all corporations in Ugljevik.

After the Bosnian War Ugljevik became a significant peacekeeping force post. For the first time after the World War II, the Russian Army and Western Allies worked together in a military mission, as the Implementation Force (IFOR) and later the Stabilization Forces (SFOR). Headquarters of the Russian Peacekeeping Mission in Bosnia was in Ugljevik. Americans had a small base in Ugljevik, across the Janja river from the Russians. In relation to this, the IFOR info magazine “Talon” wrote in one of its articles “Cold War melted on the Balkan sun”.

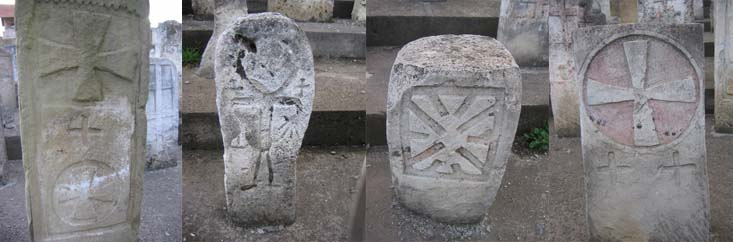
Medieval graveyards in Ugljevik village of Bogutovo Selo

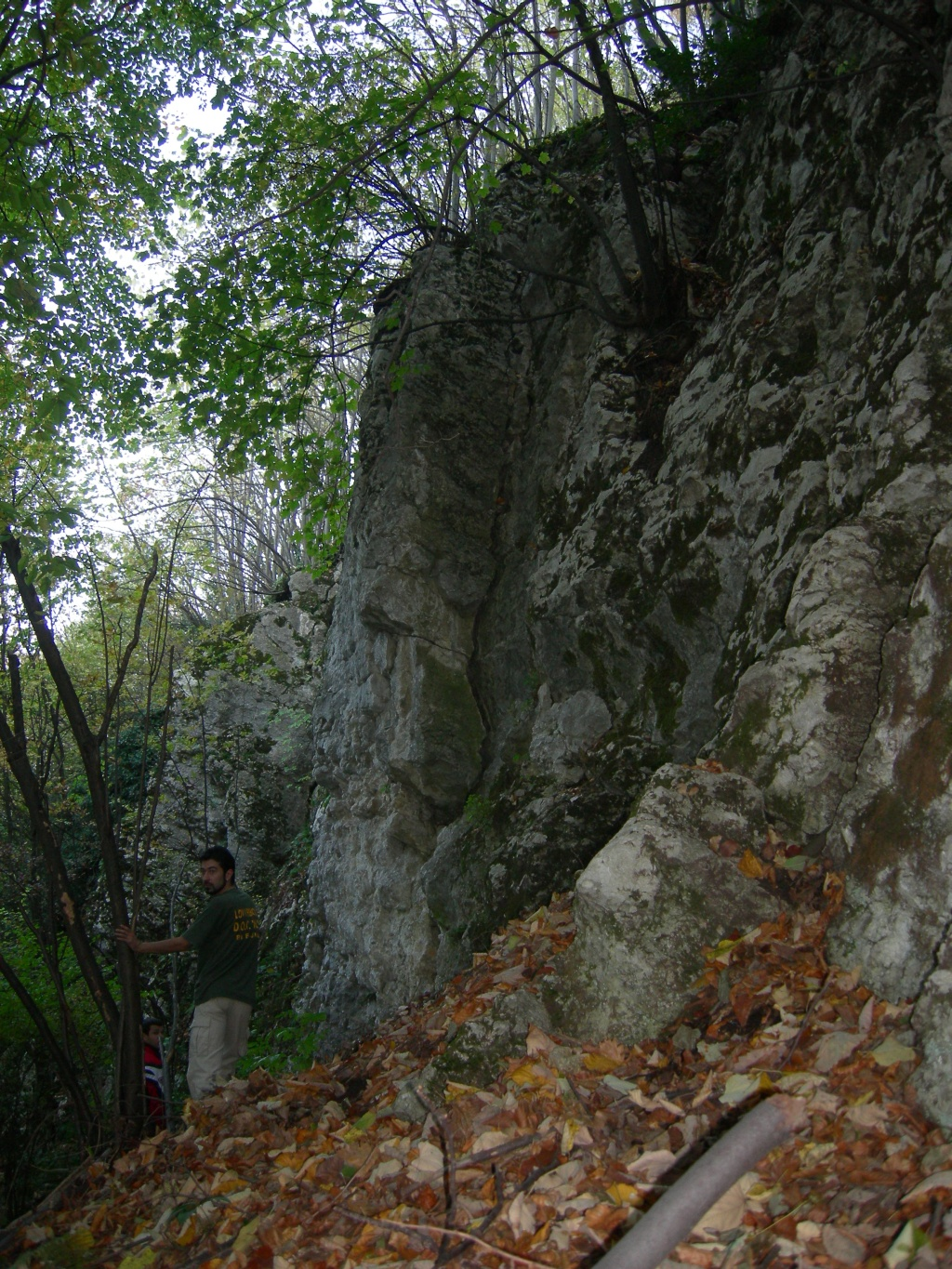
Medieval Jablan city

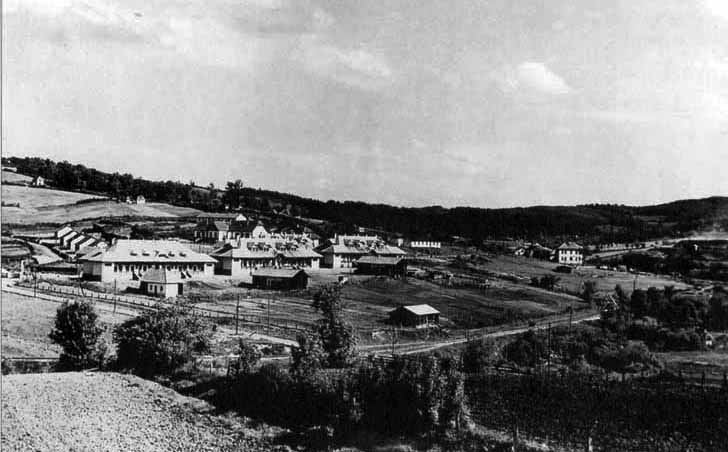
Ugljevik, miners settlement – Kolonija, in 1931

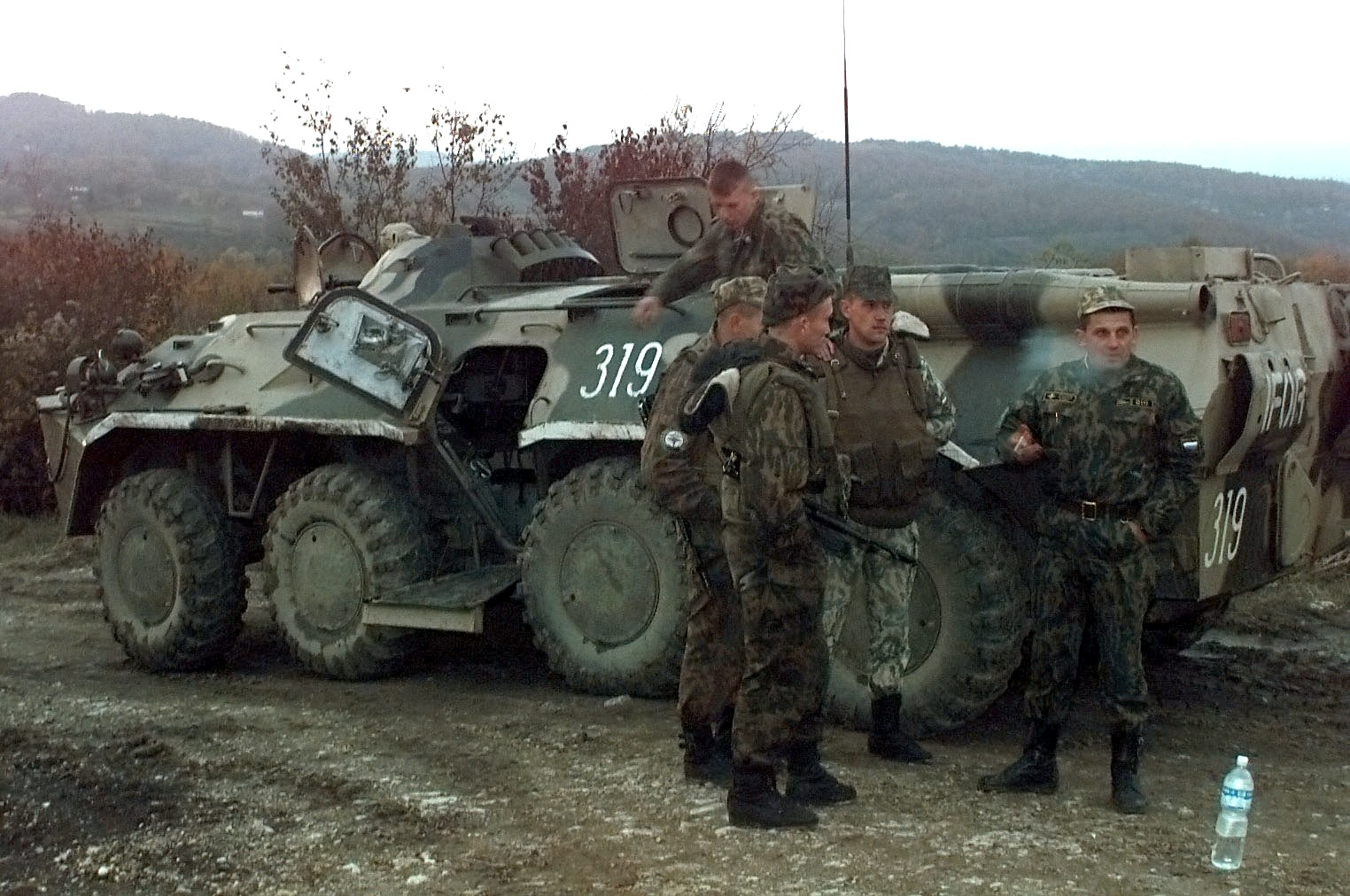
Russian peacekeepers, a part of the Operation Joint Endeavor, 1996, in Ugljevik

== Location ==
The municipality of Ugljevik borders Bijeljina to the east and north, Lopare to the west, Zvornik to the south, and also Teočak in the Federation of Bosnia and Herzegovina to the south. In the 1993 census the population was 16,456 residing in 4,733 households, covering 164 square kilometres (63 square miles). The population density was 12.44/km².

== Territorial organisation ==
The municipality of Ugljevik has the following 21 communities:

- Korenita
- Maleševci
- Zabrđe
- Ugljevička Obrijež
- Stari Ugljevik
- Ugljevik Selo
- Gornje Zabrđe
- Ravno Polje
- Bogutovo Selo
- Gornja Krćina
- Gornja Trnova
- Mezgraja
- Modran
- Donje Zabrđe
- Janjari (Atmačići)
- Srednja Trnova
- Glinje
- Sarije
- Mukat
- Stankovići
- Donja Trnova
- Atmačići

== Demographics ==
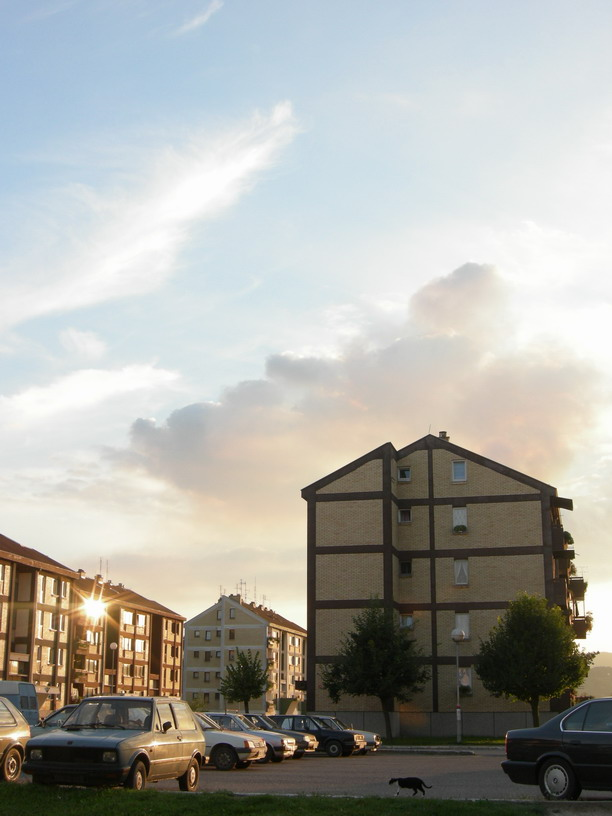
Srpske Sloge street

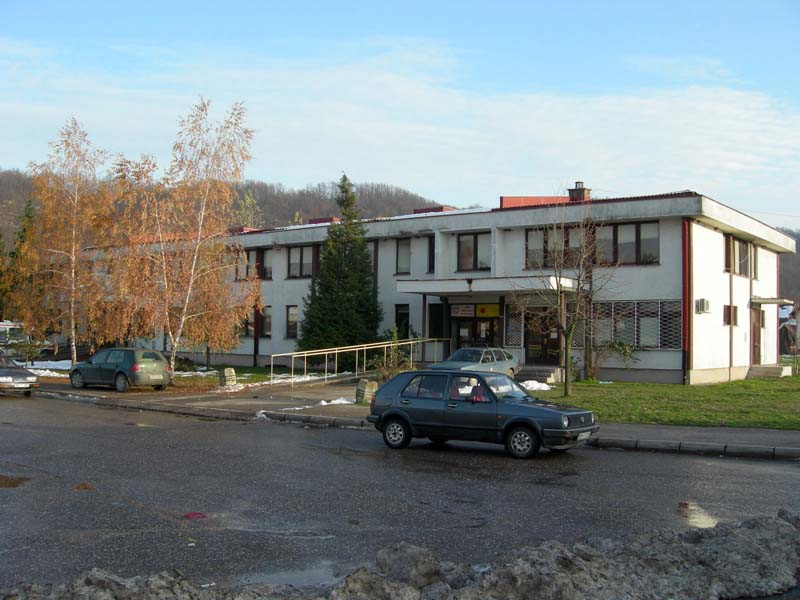
Health Center

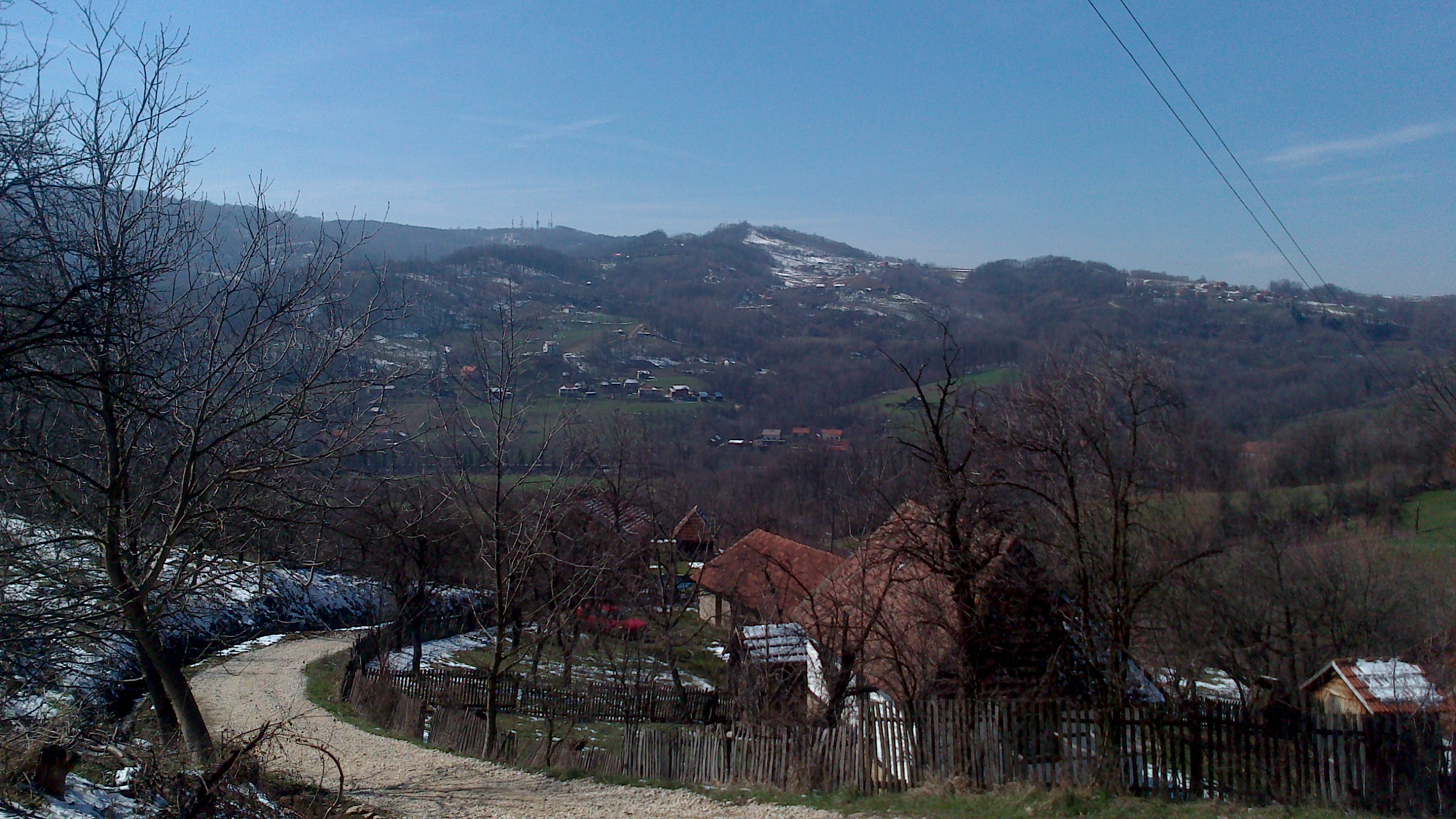
Landscape from one of the local villages

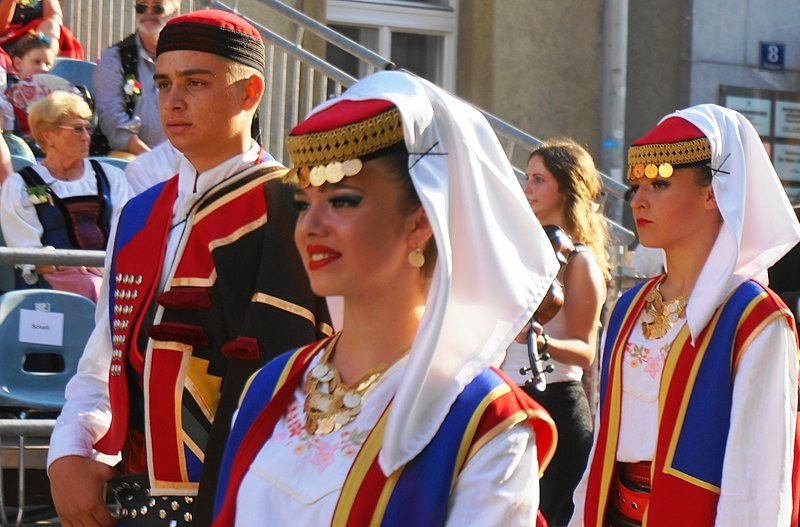
Folk costume from the area

=== Population ===
Population of the settlements – Ugljevik municipality
	Settlement	1971.	1981.	1991.	2013.
	Total	24,178	24,540	17,830	15,710
1	Atmačići			566	429
2	Bogutovo Selo			499	294
3	Donja Trnova			1,491	1,154
4	Glinje			648	461
5	Gornja Trnova			420	284
6	Janjari			651	497
7	Korenita			840	557
8	Maleševci			602	404
9	Mezgraja			714	459
10	Mukat Stankovići			458	330
11	Ravno Polje			466	598
12	Srednja Trnova			721	579
13	Stari Ugljevik			1,126	707
14	Tutnjevac			1,489	1,042
15	Ugljevička Obrijež			934	945
16	Ugljevik	2,388	2,442	2,981	4,155
17	Ugljevik Selo			693	478
18	Zabrđe			1,725	1,551

=== Ethnic composition ===
Ethnic composition – Ugljevik town
	1991.	1981.	1971.
Total	2,981	2,442	2,388
Serbs	2,426 (81.4%)	2,210 (90.5%)	2,256 (94.5%)
Bosniaks	348 (11.7%)	66 (2.7%)	86 (3.6%)
Yugoslavs	133 (4.5%)	143 (5.9%)	15 (0.6%)
Croats	39 (1.3%)	3 (0.1%)	15 (0.6%)
Others/unspecified	35 (1.2%)	16 (0.7%)	5 (0.2%)
Macedonians		4 (0.2%)	6 (0.3%)
Montenegrins			4 (0.2%)
Albanians			1 (<0.1%)

Ethnic composition – Ugljevik municipality
	2013.	1991.	1981.	1971.
Total	15,710	25,587	24,540	24,178
Serbs	13,412 (85.4%)	14,468 (56.5%)	14,066 (57.3%)	14,816 (61.2%)
Bosniaks	2,186 (14%)	10,241 (40%)	9,403 (38.3%)	8,859 (36.7%)
Others/unspecified	70 (0.5%)	532 (2%)	81 (0.3%)	58 (0.2%)
Croats	42 (0.3%)	56 (0.2%)	17 (<0.1%)	53 (0.2%)
Yugoslavs		290 (1.1%)	573 (2.3%)	35 (0.1%)
Roma			376 (1.5%)	328 (1.4%)
Montenegrins			9 (<0.1%)	13 (<0.1%)
Macedonians			7 (<0.1%)	12 (<0.1%)
Albanians			4 (<0.1%)	3 (<0.1%)
Slovenes			3 (<0.1%)	
Hungarians			1 (<0.1%)	1 (<0.1%)

== Economy ==
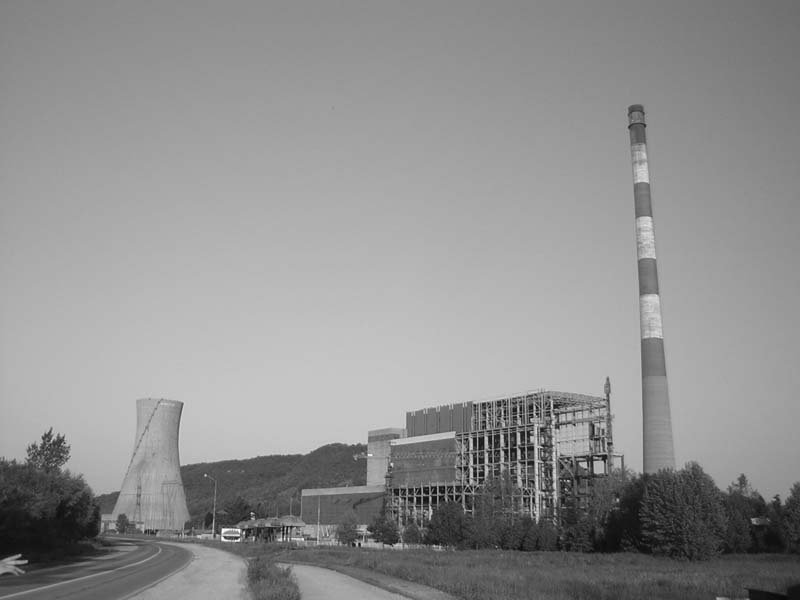
The Ugljevik Power Plant

The Ugljevik Power Plant is a 300-megawatt coal-fired power station with a 310-metre-tall (1,020 ft) chimney in the municipality.

== Notable people ==
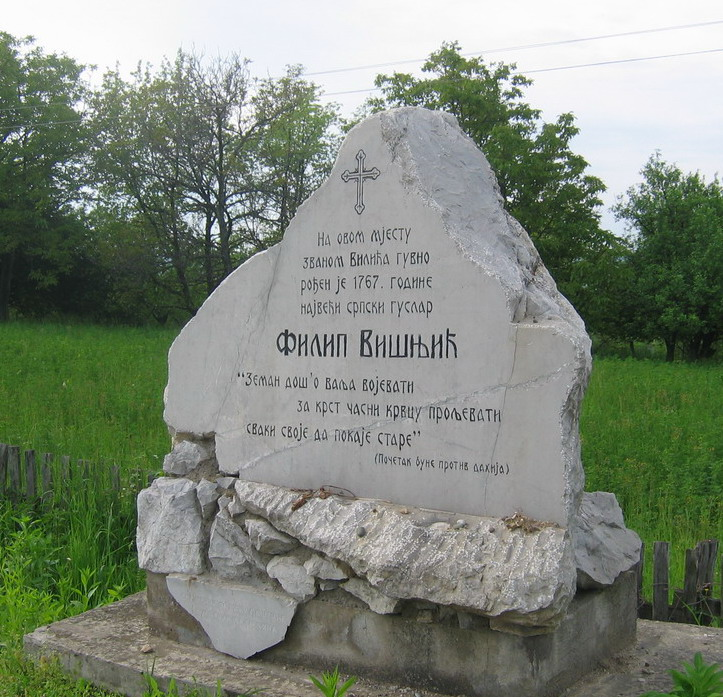
Monument to Višnjić at his birthsite

- Filip Višnjić (1767-1834), poet and musician
- Mitar Mirić, pop-folk singer

== Twin towns – sister cities ==
Ugljevik is twinned with:

- Beočin, Serbia
