= Surjan, Mrkonjić Grad =

Coordinates: 44.5319°N 17.1281°E

Surjan
- Village
- Interactive map of Surjan
- Country: Bosnia and Herzegovina
- Entity: Republika Srpska
- Time zone: UTC+1 (CET)
  - Summer (DST): UTC+2 (CEST)

Surjan is a village in western Bosnia and Herzegovina, in the Republika Srpska entity. It is located in the Bosanska Krajina, between Banja Luka and Mrkonjić Grad.
