= Potoci, Mostar =

Potoci
- Village
- Location within Bosnia and Herzegovina
- Coordinates: 43°24′30″N 17°52′30″E
- Country: Bosnia and Herzegovina
- Entity: Federation of Bosnia and Herzegovina
- Canton: Herzegovina-Neretva
- Municipality: City of Mostar

Area
  - Total: 3.75 sq mi (9.72 km^{2})

Population (2013)
  - Total: 2,183
  - Density: 582/sq mi (225/km^{2})
- Time zone: UTC+1 (CET)
  - Summer (DST): UTC+2 (CEST)
- Postal code: 88000

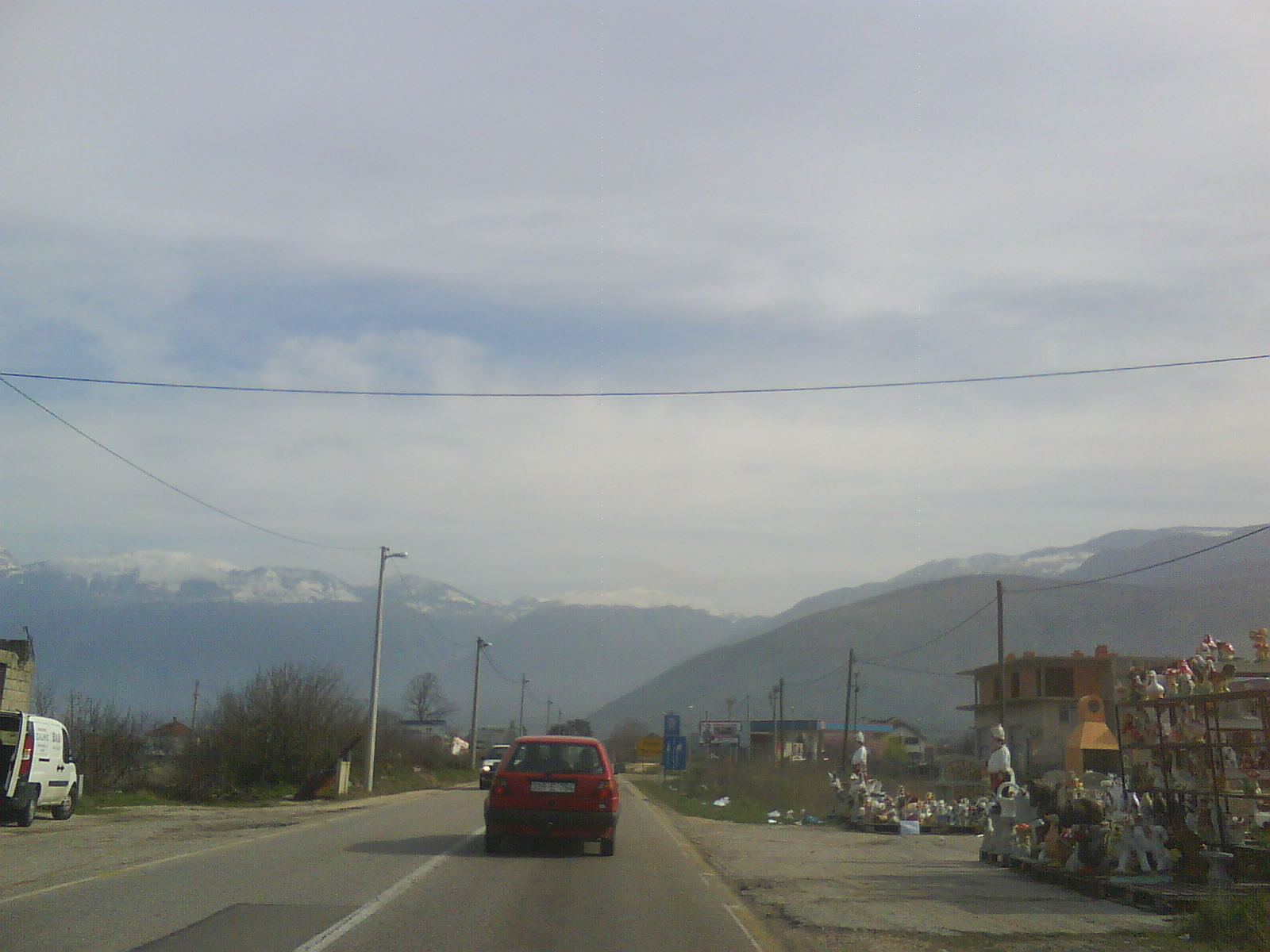

Potoci is a village in the City of Mostar, Bosnia and Herzegovina.

== Demographics ==
=== 2013 ===
2,183 total

- Bosniaks - 1,160 (53.1%)
- Croats - 759 (34.8%)
- Serbs - 226 (10.4%)
- others - 38 (1.7%)
