= Marijan Lišnjić =

Roman-catholic bishop

The Most Reverend Marijan Lišnjić OFM
- Bishop of Makarska and Apostolic Administrator of Duvno and Skradin
- Church: Catholic Church
- Diocese: Makarska Duvno Skradin
- Appointed: 11 February 1664
- Predecessor: Petar Kačić
- Successor: Nikola Bijanković

Orders
- Ordination: 1634
- Consecration: 1664

Personal details
- Born: 14 May 1609 Sovići or Gorica, Herzegovina, Bosnia, Ottoman Empire
- Died: 5 March 1686 (aged 76) Makarska, Republic of Venice
- Buried: Makarska, Croatia
- Denomination: Catholic

Marijan Lišnjić OFM (14 May 1609 – 7 March 1686) was a Croatian and Bosnian-Herzegovinian prelate of the Catholic Church who served as the bishop of Makarska from 1664 and apostolic administrator of Duvno from 1667 to his death in 1686. Both of his dioceses were under the Ottoman occupation, and the population suffered from both the war between the Republic of Venice and the Ottomans and the treatment from both, with Venetians enslaving and selling Christians to the Turks, and Ottomans oppressing their faith.

Lišnjić was the first to introduce secular clergy to Bosnia Eyalet after it fell to the Ottomans in the 15th century, the region where the pastoral care was given to the Franciscans.

== Early life ==
Lišnjić was born either in Sovići or Gorica near Grude in Herzegovina, at the time part of the Ottoman Empire. He became a Franciscan friar in the local friary in 1630. He was a member of the Franciscan Province of Bosnia. In 1634 he was ordained as a priest in Zaostrog. Afterwards, he studied philosophy in Lucca and theology Milan from 1634 to 1642. After finishing his studies, he served as an educator in the Fojnica friary in Bosnia for several years and then in Zaostrog. In 1659, he went to Rome to sell grains donated by the Spanish king to the Bosnian Province, which became an affair. He reported the secretary of the Congregation for the Propagation of the Faith, but due to his being poorly informed, the reports were undefined and incorrect.

After the death of the bishop of Bosnia Marijan Maravić, Lišnjić was a candidate for his succession. However, due to the opposition from the Austrian Emperor and the Bosnian Franciscan clergy, he wasn't appointed to the office. Instead, the Bosnian Franciscans accused him of withholding the money from the grains, which led him to be imprisoned in 1662 in Rome. He was acquitted in 1664.

== Episcopate ==
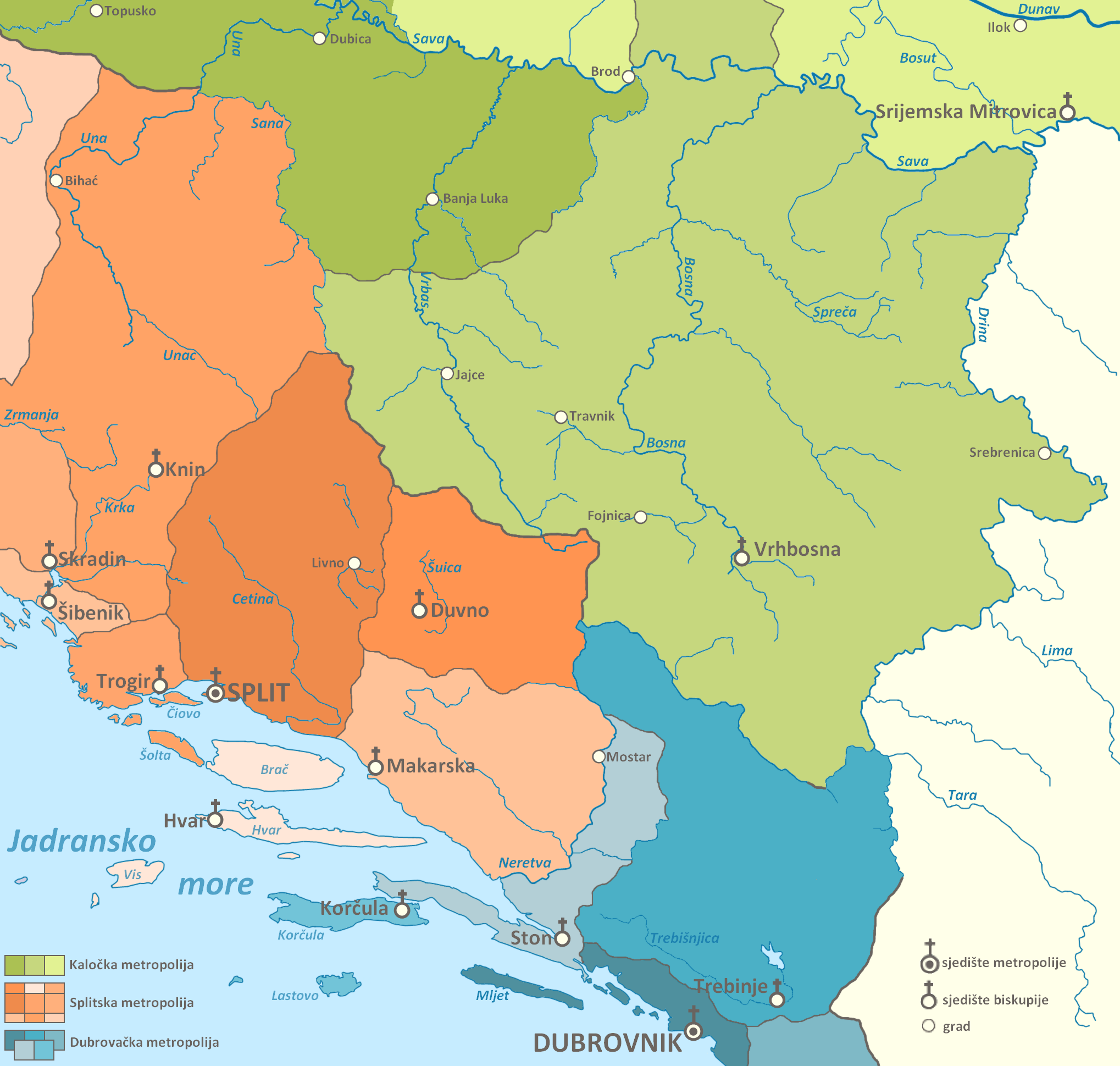
The Dioceses of Makarska and Duvno

As the Diocese of Makarska was vacant, Lišnjić was named its bishop on 11 February 1664. The same year he was consecrated in Rome. 1666 Lišnjić founded a boys' public school in Makarska, active until 1672. He also reorganised the parishes in the diocese. On 20 January 1667, with the papal approval, the Congregation entrusted him with the administration of the Diocese of Duvno. Lišnjić was unaware of the Diocese of Duvno and considered that its territory already belonged to the Diocese of Makarska. He thought the same for the areas of the Skoplje valley, Travnik and Jajce, which belonged to the Diocese of Bosnia. Lišnjić thought that the Diocese of Dulma/Delminium (the Latin name of the diocese) had a seat in Bjelaj to the north.

The two dioceses were heavily inflicted by the Ottoman–Venetian war that lasted until 1669. Part of the population of the Diocese of Makarska fled to the neighbouring isles of Brač and Hvar, while those that remained were maltreated by the Uskoks. These irregular soldiers hadn't differentiated the Christians from the invading Ottomans. Before the war, the Diocese of Makarska had around 15,000 people; after the war, only 5,000 remained, and all were poor. The Diocese of Duvno's population also fled the Ottomans in the neighbouring Dalmatian hinterland, some 8,000 of them. Lišnjić's work was also burdened because he needed to pay out the local pasha and various Ottoman officials to act freely.

In 1667, Lišnjić visited the village of Raška Gora to be surprised that the population there didn't know what a bishop was. In 1669, the Congregation granted him his request from 1665 to execute episcopal duties in the Franciscan friary in Rama. In 1670 and 1671, Lišnjić visited the parishes of the Diocese of Duvno and reported that the pastoral care in the parish of Duvno was provided by Friar Ivan Ančić from Lipa, while the parish included the villages of Kongora, Lipa, Mandino Selo, Oplećani, Županj Potok, Mokronoge, Kolo and Stipanjići. None of the villages had a church. The old churches were ruined, while the Ottomans were disallowed from constructing new ones. Lišnjić reported that the area was sparsely populated, not just by Catholics but Muslims also. The situation in the parish of Roško Polje was even worse, where there were five Catholic and seven Muslim families, while the church of St. John the Baptist was in ruins. Worried about fleeing Catholic subjects, the beys of the Kopčić family invited Lišnjić to visit the Catholics in Duvno. During his visit to the diocese in 1671, he disputed the control of the parishes and the church tithe with the Franciscans. The Franciscan provincial Ante Travničanin complained to the Congregation in 1672.

The believers in the parish of Mostar, which belonged to the Diocese of Makarska, weren't allowed to have masses and were persecuted by the Ottomans. In 1670, Lišnjić served a mass in Mostar only to be arrested by the Ottomans and threatened to convert to Islam. The local Catholics ransomed him. Another problem for Lišnjić was the enslavement of Christians by the Venetians. In 1665, he wrote a letter to the Pope, complaining that the Venetians were selling Christians to the Ottomans as slaves. Lišnjić claimed that some 7,000 Christians from his diocese were sold to slavery by the Venetians.

Both dioceses, Makarska and Duvno, lacked priests. West Herzegovina, under the jurisdiction of the dioceses of Makarska and Duvno, didn't have enough priests, all of whom were Franciscans. Lišnjić intended to change this by appointing secular clergy in some parishes. Mijo Grbavac, a secular priest appointed by Lišnjić in 1664 as a parish priest in Brotnjo, was the first secular priest to serve in Bosnia Eyalet after it fell to the Ottomans in the 15th century. The Franciscans opposed these appointments and expelled Grbavac with the help of the Ottomans to his home village. The Ottomans, urged by the Franciscans, also imprisoned Lišnjić. In 1669, Lišnjić appointed Petar Radunović, a secular priest from Posušje as a parish priest in Rakitno, which was opposed by the Rama Franciscans. Lišnjić intended to give Rakitno, Tribistovo, and Roško Polje to Radunović for pastoral care, but failed. Lišnjić tried to circumvent the influence of the Franciscans, to no avail.

From the summer of 1672, Lišnjić was in Rome. While on his way back to Dalmatia, on 5 April 1673, Lišnjić was given the administration over the Diocese of Skradin, which was vacant since its last bishop Pavao Posilović died in 1656/57. In 1682, Lišnjić escaped the Ottomans to Zadar. On 21 February 1684, he wrote to the Congregation after someone complained that he wasn't fit for the service. In his report, he wrote that the Diocese of Scradin had only two Franciscan priests, so he ordained more secular and Franciscan priests and distributed them throughout the diocese. He didn't visit all of the parishes of the Diocese of Skradin, being afraid of the ecclesiastical punishments since some of the parishes were claimed by the bishops of Nin and Šibenik. During that time, Lišnjić was suffering from gout.

The end of Lišnjić's episcopate was marked by the Great Turkish War (1683–99) and the Morean War (1684–99), both of which brought plunders, murders, enslavement, flights, sickness and diseases. However, Lišnjić continued to stand for the faithful, entering into a dispute with the bishop of Bosnia over the parishes controlled by the Rama friary. On 21 February 1684, he asked the Congregation to ban the bishop of Bosnia Nikola Ogramić from coming to the territory of the Sanjak of Klis where these parishes were located. The Great Turkish War and the Morean War led to a series of defeats for the Ottomans, leading to the liberation of Makarska, the seat of the Diocese of Makarska, and other Dalmatian towns. The defeated Ottomans often took revenge on the Catholics who remained in their territories. These caused hardships for Lišnjić since the Ottomans made it difficult for them to come to their territories. Aware of his difficult situation, in 1685, the Congregation sent him 50 scudi.

Lišnjić died on 3 March 1686 in Makarska and is buried there in the Franciscan church.

== Footnotes ==
Catholic Church titles
Preceded by Petar Kačić	Bishop of Makarska; 1664–1686	Succeeded by Nikola Bijanković
Preceded by Michael Jahnn (as bishop)	Apostolic Administrator of Duvno; 1667–1686	Succeeded by Nikola Bijanković
Preceded by Pavao Posilović	Apostolic Administrator of Skradin; 1673–1686	Succeeded by Nikola Bijanković
