= Nikola Bijanković =

Croatian and Bosnian-Herzegovinian prelate

The Most Reverend Nikola Bijanković C.O. Servant of God
- Bishop of Makarska
- Church: Catholic Church
- Diocese: Makarska
- Appointed: 19 December 1698
- Installed: 10 May 1699
- Predecessor: Marijan Lišnjić
- Successor: Stjepan Blašković

Orders
- Ordination: 15 June 1669
- Consecration: 10 May 1699 by Giovanni Alberto Badoer

Personal details
- Born: 15 August 1645 Split, Republic of Venice
- Died: 10 August 1730 (aged 84) Makarska, Republic of Venice
- Buried: Makarska Co-cathedral, Makarska, Croatia
- Denomination: Catholic
- Education: Illyrian Academy

Nikola Bijanković C.O. (15 August 1645 – 10 August 1730) was a Croatian and Bosnian-Herzegovinian prelate of the Catholic Church who served as the bishop of Makarska from 1699 to his death in 1730. As bishop of Makarska, Bijanković also administered the dioceses of Duvno and Skradin under the Ottoman occupation.

== Early life ==
Bijanković was born in Split, at the time part of the Republic of Venice, to his father, Dominik, from the isle of Šolta and his mother, Laura née Nadalin, a Venetian. He finished grammar school and philosophical and theological studies at the Illyrian Academy in his home town, where he was ordained as a priest on 15 June 1669, as a member of the Oratorians. Afterwards, he was a parish priest in Kaštel Sućurac from 1669 to 1672, a canon of the Archdiocese of Split and a lecturer in the Split seminary from 1672. Bijanković was a close associate of Archbishop Stephanus Cosimi of Split and helped found the seminary. In 1673, he was appointed an apostolic missionary for the territories of the Archdiocese of Split under the Ottoman occupation, a post he held until 1676 and again from 1680 to 1696. 1676, he established the Oratorian community and built an oratory in Split. In between, he served as a vicar general of the Diocese of Nin from 1676 to 1680. He also served as vicar general of the Archdiocese of Split from 1684 to 1695.

On 3 September 1686, he was appointed as an apostolic vicar of the dioceses of Makarska and Skradin. Not long after he received a decree on his appointment, Bijanković went for a visit to the two dioceses, reporting to the Congregation for the Propagation of the Faith on their status. During the Morean War fought between 1684 and 1699 he was a military chaplain in all of the major battles against the Ottomans.

== Episcopate ==
On 5 March 1695, the Venetian government nominated him as bishop of Makarska, and the Pope confirmed the Appointment on 19 December 1698. He was installed on 10 May 1699, with Giovanni Alberto Badoer, the patriarch of Venice as the principal consecrator and Leonardo Balsarini, the titular archbishop of Corinth and Giovanni Vincenzo de Filippi, the bishop of Cephalonia and Zakynthos as the co-consecrators. Bijanković paid special care to the poor and sick and established several brotherhoods in Makarska and surrounding areas. Through his commitment, the Diocese of Makarska received Jesuit missionaries, while his efforts to reorganise the parishes in line with the Council of Trent led him into a dispute with the Franciscans.

Bijanković also administered the Diocese of Duvno and is most credited with the conservation of the Catholic population there during the Great Turkish War and the Morean War. He regularly visited the areas of the Diocese of Duvno and other parts of his dioceses under the Ottoman occupation, staying there for several weeks and risking his life. In cases when he was unable to visit them, he would empower other priests, as he did in 1703 for the areas of Mostar, Duvno and Rama. In July 1706, he visited the areas of Duvno, Rakitno, Roško Polje and Vinica; he visited again in July 1710, staying in Vinica, Roško Polje, Vojkovići, Buško Blato, Bukovica, Kongora, Zvirnjača, Blidinje, Rakitno and Studenci. At the invitation of an Ottoman captain from Duvno to his wedding, Bijanković revisited the wider Duvno area in 1713. Not long after the Ottoman–Venetian War (1714–1718) ended, Bijanković revisited the Diocese of Duvno on the invitation of the beys from the Kopčić family. He last visited the Diocese of Duvno in August 1723, when he stayed in Vinica, Roško Polje, and Duvno. Local Muslims, including the beys from the Kopčić and Izakagić families, welcomed Bijanković, and local Muslim families asked him to perform Catholic rites in their homes and on their land. Bey of Roško Polje Ahmed Izakagić asked Bijanković to appoint a parish priest for Roško Polje and gifted a horse and scholarship for his priest Grga Kardunović.

Considered to have died a saint, his beatification process began in 1881.

== Works ==
Bijanković translated Naredbe od zbora darxave splitske (Orders of the Synod of the Diocese of Split) from Latin. The work contains decisions of a diocesan synod held by Archbishop Cosimi in Split in 1688. The work was published in Venice in 1699. According to Fancev and Ostojić, Bijanković translated the catechism authored by Cardinal Robert Bellarmine under the title Nauk krstjanski kratak složen (The Christian teachings in short), while Jurišić and Vidović state that Bijanković authored the work. The 1st volume was published in 1708 and the 2nd in 1724, both in Venice. As a member of the Illyrian Academy, Bijanković wrote a recension for the translation of the work of Dominique Bouhours translated by Ivan Petar Marchi under the title Misli karstjanske za svaki dan od miseca (Christian thoughts for every day in a month), published in Venice in 1704.

== Footnotes ==
Catholic Church titles
Preceded by Marijan Lišnjić	Bishop of Makarska; 1699–1730	Succeeded by Stjepan Blašković
