= Rašćani, Tomislavgrad =

Rašćani
- Village
- Etymology: Serbo-Croatian: hrast (oak)
- Interactive map of Rašćani
- Location within Bosnia and Herzegovina
- Coordinates: 43°41′21.36″N 17°17′57.03″E
- Country: Bosnia and Herzegovina
- Entity: Federation of Bosnia and Herzegovina
- Canton: Canton 10
- Municipality: Tomislavgrad

Area
  - Total: 9.88 km^{2} (3.81 sq mi)

Population (2013)
  - Total: 41
  - Density: 4.1/km^{2} (11/sq mi)
- Time zone: UTC+1 (CET)
  - Summer (DST): UTC+2 (CEST)
- Postal code: 80240

Rašćani (Serbian Cyrillic: Рашћани) or Rašćane (Serbian Cyrillic: Рашћане) is a village in the Municipality of Tomislavgrad in Canton 10 of the Federation of Bosnia and Herzegovina, an entity of Bosnia and Herzegovina. According to the 2013 census, it had 41 inhabitants.

The village was settled in ancient times by the Illyrian tribe Dalmatae. It was also populated during the Roman times. In the modern period, the village was settled by Serbs, in waves from 500 to 300 years ago. During the Bosnian War, the Serb population was exchanged and the village is now settled by Croat refugees from Dobretići.

== Name ==
In original form, the village was called Rašćane. Ethimologically, the name comes from hrast, a Serbo-Croatian word for oak. The village was first mentioned by the Herzegovinian Franciscan Petar Bakula in 1867.

== History ==
On the locality known as Mandina Gradina, between Rašćani and Mandino Selo, there was an ancient sanctuary of the Illyrian tribe of Dalmatae. Archeologist Philipp Ballif found an ancient Roman road that crossed Rašćani. The road led from Rašćani across the mountain Ljubuša, to Proslap. South of this road, in the Eastern Orthodox cemetery, there is a tumulus, 35 metres in diameter in 4 metres in height. The tumulus has three damaged stećci shaped as amorphous plates on it, sunk into the ground.

The local Serb population arrived in the period from 300 to 600 years ago. Jevto Dedijer recorded five surnames there: Karan, Važić, Stanišić, Milisav, Vulić and one family surnamed Ćevap from the village of Baljci. Dedijer writes that the Karan family hailed from Lika, and that they arrived to Rašćani from Prisoje. The Važić family arrived from Kotor in present-day Montenegro, and they arrived in Rašćani from Aržano. The Stanišić family arrived from Lipa. The Serb population spoke Ikavian Šćakavian form of the Western Ikavian dialect of Serbo-Croatian, spoken mainly by Croats. As the Catholic chronicles never mentioned Rašćani, until 1867, it is possible that the village was for the whole time of the Ottoman rule, inhabited exclusively by the Eastern Orthodox Serbs.

In the early 1930s, many of the young craftsmen left the village for Austria. During World War II, the Ustaše carried out atrocities in the village.

In the summer of 1945, the preparations for the colonisation of Vojvodina started. The Serbs of Tomislavgrad were designated to populate Obrovac in the Municipality of Bačka Palanka. Other colonizers included those from Jajce, Livno, Bugojno and Kupres. The colonisation ended between the end of 1945 and early 1946. In total, 36 villagers left for colonisation, while some returned.

In 1948, after the agricultural cooperative "Karan Milan" was established. It included the lands of those villagers who left for Vojvodina, the expropriated lands of the richer landowners, and the lands of those who volunteered to enter the cooperative. Not all villagers agreed to enter the cooperative, so the authorities used coercion. Several families from the village never entered the cooperative. After authorities realised that the cooperatives didn't produce the wanted results, they were dissolved in 1953.

In the mid-1950s, some villagers continued to emigrate for economic reasons to Syrmia, also located in Vojvodina. These migrations lasted from 1954 to 1958. They settled in Putinci near Ruma and Stara Pazova.

During the Bosnian War in 1992, the Croat forces isolated Rašćani, where they gathered Serbs from the Municipality of Tomislavgrad in order to protect them from the extremists. However, they weren't adequately protected, so the extremists managed to enter the village and plunder it, harassing the civilians and eventually murdering two of them.

Rašćani now is settled by Croat refugees from Dobretići, expelled by the Serb forces. There are seven families of them in total. Their main economic activity is husbandry, as it used to be prior to their persecution from Dobretići.

== Geography ==
Rašćani is located 7 kilometres east of the town Tomislavgrad. It is situated on the elevation at the very edge of the Duvno polje, thus making it insusceptible to floods. The flattest and most fertile part of the Duvno Polje is located just beneath the village. Above the village is the Ljubuša mountain.

== Demographics ==
According to the 2013 census, the village had 41 inhabitants.

Ethnic composition
	2013	1991	1953	1921
Croats	41 (100%)	0 (0%)	0 (0%)	0 (0%)
Serbs	0 (0%)	103 (100%)	266 (100%)	290 (100%)
Total	41 (100.0%)	103 (100.0%)	266 (100.0%)	290 (100.0%)

== Religion ==
The village belongs to the Catholic Parish of Kongora. The parish is part of the Deanery of Duvno and the Diocese of Mostar-Duvno.

In 1891, the local Serb population erected an Eastern Orthodox church on the nearby tumulus and dedicated it to the Assumption of Mary. The church was destroyed during the Bosnian War on 9 April 1992, after the discovery that local Serbs were storing weaponry in the underground chamber of the church. A new church was built on its location and consecrated in 2020. The church belongs to the Parish of Duvno, which is part of the Eparchy of Zahumlje and Herzegovina.

== Education ==
In 1909, a building for the four-grade elementary school was erected in the neighbouring village of Mandino Selo, just between it and Rašćani. The first school year was 1911/12. This school is still attended by the children from Rašćani. As of 1948, the children would continue their higher education at the Lower Real Gymnasium, which had four grades.

After the educational reform in 1958, elementary education had eight grades, while higher education had four grades. Thus the eight-grades elementary school was established in Duvno, which was attended by the children from Rašćani after they finished the four-grade elementary school in Mandino Selo. From the school year 1963/64, they attended the fifth grade at the school in Kongora. From the school year 1971/72, when the school in Kongora gained the right to become an eight-grades school, to 1979/80, the children from Rašćani finished the eighth grade in Kongora. However, after 1979/80, they attended the eight-grades school in Duvno.

== Bibliography ==
- Dodig, Radoslav (2000). "Iz duvanjske onomastike" [From the onomastics of Duvno]. In Krišto, Jure (ed.). Duvanjski zbornik [The collection of papers of Duvno] (in Croatian). Zagreb-Tomislavgrad: Hrvatski institut za povijest–Naša ognjišta–Zajednica Duvnjaka Tomislavgrad. ISBN 9536324253.
- Jolić, Robert (2010). Duvno kroz stoljeća [Duvno through centuries] (in Croatian). Tomislavgrad: Naša ognjišta. ISBN 9531684030.
- Jolić, Robert (2017). Sto godina župe Kongora [Hundred years of the Parish of Kongora] (in Croatian). Tomislavgrad: Naša ognjišta. ISBN 9789958782503.
- Karan, Milan (2016). Srbi Duvna [The Serbs of Duvno] (in Serbian). Aranđelovac: Udruženje građana "Srbi Duvna" Beograd. ISBN 9788691967307.
- Kovačević, Marko (2000). "Duvanjski govor i njegove posebnosti" [The speech of Duvno and its peculiarities]. In Krišto, Jure (ed.). Duvanjski zbornik [The collection of papers of Duvno] (in Croatian). Zagreb-Tomislavgrad: Hrvatski institut za povijest–Naša ognjišta–Zajednica Duvnjaka Tomislavgrad. ISBN 9536324253.
- Milić, Angelika (2000). "Popis nekropola duvanjskog područja" [The list of necropolis of the region of Duvno]. In Krišto, Jure (ed.). Duvanjski zbornik [The collection of papers of Duvno] (in Croatian). Zagreb-Tomislavgrad: Hrvatski institut za povijest–Naša ognjišta–Zajednica Duvnjaka Tomislavgrad. ISBN 9536324253.
- Nikić, Andrija (2000). "Katolici duvanjskog kraja do osmanske okupacije" [The Catholics of the region of Duvno until the Ottoman occupation]. In Krišto, Jure (ed.). Duvanjski zbornik [The collection of papers of Duvno] (in Croatian). Zagreb-Tomislavgrad: Hrvatski institut za povijest–Naša ognjišta–Zajednica Duvnjaka Tomislavgrad. ISBN 9536324253.
- Šarić, Ivan (2000). "Arheološka topografija duvanjskog kraja" [The archeological topography of the region of Duvno]. In Krišto, Jure (ed.). Duvanjski zbornik [The collection of papers of Duvno] (in Croatian). Zagreb-Tomislavgrad: Hrvatski institut za povijest–Naša ognjišta–Zajednica Duvnjaka Tomislavgrad. ISBN 9536324253.
