= Bukova Gora =

Bukova Gora may refer to:

- Bukova Gora, Tomislavgrad, a settlement in the Municipality of Tomislavgrad, Bosnia and Herzegovina
- Bukova Gora, Kočevje, a settlement in the Municipality of Kočevje, Slovenia
