= Municipality of Tomislavgrad =

Municipality of Tomislavgrad Općina Tomislavgrad (Croatian)
- Municipality
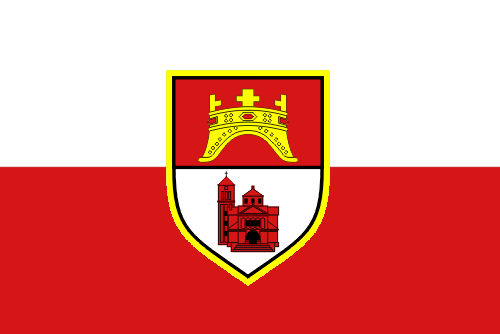
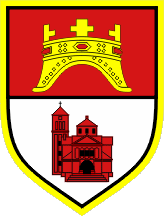
- Flag Coat of arms
- Etymology: Named after Tomislav of Croatia and the Croatian word grad ("town")
- Nickname: Duvno
- Location of the Municipality of Tomislavgrad within Bosnia and Herzegovina
- Country: Bosnia and Herzegovina
- Entity: Federation of Bosnia and Herzegovina
- Canton: Canton 10
- Seat: Tomislavgrad

Government
  - Municipal president: Ivan Buntić (HNP)

Area
  - Municipality: 965.8 km^{2} (372.9 sq mi)
  - Land: 919.3 km^{2} (354.9 sq mi)
  - Water: 46.5 km^{2} (18.0 sq mi)
  - Urban: 7.5 km^{2} (2.9 sq mi)
  - Rural: 911.8 km^{2} (352.0 sq mi)

Population (2013)
  - Municipality: 31,592
  - Density: 34.37/km^{2} (89.01/sq mi)
- Demonym: Tomislavgradian
- Website: www.tomislavgrad.gov.ba

The Municipality of Tomislavgrad (Croatian: Općina Tomislavgrad) is a municipality in Canton 10 of the Federation of Bosnia and Herzegovina, an entity of Bosnia and Herzegovina. Its seat is in the town of Tomislavgrad. According to the 2013 census, it has a population of 31,592.

== History ==
=== Antiquity ===
The area of the municipality has been inhabited by the Illyrian tribe of Dalmatae. The town of Delminium was established by the Dalmatae in what is now the territory of the Municipality of Tomislavgrad.

The area has been populated since 4000 BC – 2400 BC, even before the arrival of the Illyrians. From that period, only polished stone axes remain as evidence of early human presence. The Bronze Age (1800 BC – 800 BC) also left a few artifacts in Tomislavgrad. The archaeological collection of the Franciscan friary in Široki Brijeg included 34 bronze sickles, 3 axes, and two spears found in the area, particularly in Stipanjići and Lug. These items were given to the archaeological collection "fra Mijo Čuić and fra Stjepan Naletilić." Later, Fr Vojislav Mikulić found a bronze axe in Letka which was added to the collection. Unfortunately, the collection was destroyed in a fire at the end of World War II, leaving only one sickle and axe. This evidence indicates that the early inhabitants of Tomislavgrad were cattlemen, farmers, and warriors.

The Illyrians left numerous material proofs from their time. They built 36 fortifications on the slopes of the surrounding mountains, serving as watchtowers or defensive forts. Many Illyrian graves have also been found, dating from the Bronze and Iron Ages to the Roman conquest of Delminium. These graves contained jewelry and items used by the deceased.

The Celts also inhabited the area, bringing higher culture, crafts, and better weapons. However, the small number of Celts eventually assimilated into the Illyrian population.

The Romans conquered the territory of the Illyrian tribe Ardiaei, with the Dalmatae being one of the last bastions of Illyrian freedom. The Dalmatae attacked Roman wards near Neretva, Greek merchant towns, and the Roman-friendly Illyrian tribe Daors. They fortified their settlements and surrounded their capital with smaller forts. It is estimated that about 5,000 Dalmatae lived in Delminium during this time.

In 167 BC, the Romans conquered the entire Adriatic coast south of Neretva, destroying the state of the Ardiaei. The first conflict between the Dalmatae and Rome began in 156 BC. The consuls Gaius Marcius Figulus and Publius Cornelius Scipio Nasica Corculum conquered and destroyed Delminium, with the latter receiving a triumph in Rome for his victory. Delminium was described as a "large city," almost inaccessible and impregnable. The Romans used lighted arrows to burn the wooden houses. After various rebellions and three wars with Rome, the Dalmatae were finally subdued in 9 AD.

Following the Roman conquest of Delminium, they built roads and bridges, connecting the Adriatic coast in Salona (Solin) and Narona (Vid near Metković) through Delminium. Remains of these roads still exist. The Romans introduced their culture, language, legislation, and religion, and Tomislavgrad experienced 400 years of peace.

After the Romans defeated the Dalmatae, Delminium was almost abandoned, with a Roman military crew stationed there to maintain control over the Illyrians. The Romans began rebuilding Delminium in 18 and 19 AD during the reign of Emperor Tiberius. A Roman forum was built in the center of the city, on the site of the present-day Nikola Tavelić basilica.

In 1896, Fra Anđeo Nuć discovered various sculptures of Roman pagan deities, fragments of pagan sarcophagi, and columns of medieval Christian churches. Notable discoveries included two votive monuments and altars dedicated to the goddess Diana, one altar dedicated to the native Illyrian god Armatus, and one votive plate dedicated to the goddess Libera. Later finds included a relief of Diana, a relief of Diana and Silvanus, new pagan altars, fragments of sarcophagi, clay pottery, column parts, and various other artifacts from the Roman and early medieval ages. These findings led to the conclusion that the present-day Catholic graveyard "Karaula" (previously an Ottoman military border post and guardhouse) was a Roman and Illyrian pagan sanctuary and graveyard.

=== Middle Ages ===
Due to the scarcity of documents, the early Middle Ages in the present-day Municipality of Tomislavgrad are shrouded in mystery, similar to the broader history of the Croats. Written records are almost non-existent. Some Croatian traditions were later recorded by chroniclers, such as the Chronicle of the Priest of Duklja, compiled by Archbishop Gregory of Bar in the second half of the 11th century, and De administrando imperio by the Byzantine Emperor Constantine VII. Constantine VII states that the Croats arrived in the last wave of migration from the area of Greater or White Croatia (around present-day Kraków in Poland) to the Roman provinces of Pannonia and Dalmatia.

The immigration of Croats to the area of today's Tomislavgrad and their interaction with the indigenous population are not fully understood. The Croats breached the defensive lines on the Danube and began settling in these Roman provinces at the end of the 6th century and especially at the beginning of the 7th century. Constantine VII records that they came at the invitation of Emperor Heraclius to defend the empire from the Avars, which they successfully did. In the conquered area, they established their own kingdom. In 640, Pope John IV, a Dalmatian from the city of Salona, sent a mission with Abbot Martin to redeem natives captured by the Croats. Archbishop Grgur notes that at the end of the 8th century, the area of today's Tomislavgrad was central to the then-Croatian state. He writes that during the time of King Budimir, a significant national assembly was held in Duvno with papal envoys in attendance. The Croatian king was crowned at this assembly and divided the kingdom into administrative provinces. Duvno was on the border between the provinces of Red Croatia in the east and White Croatia in the west. Dominik Mandić claims the assembly was held around 753, but the Archbishop of Bar dates King Budimir's reign from 887 to 917, implying the assembly occurred in 885 or 886. Ivan Kukuljević Sakcinski suggested that Budimir was actually Tomislav of Croatia, although some historians dispute the assembly's occurrence and question the credibility of the Chronicle.

The end of the 8th century marked significant changes for Croatia and the area of Duvno. In 796, Charlemagne defeated the Avars and established Frankish rule in Croatian territories, bringing his empire into contact with Byzantium. Charles recognized Byzantine supremacy over Venice and the Dalmatian city-states, affecting the Croat-inhabited areas outside these cities. The Frankish political system was introduced, and Frankish Christian missionaries were active from the 9th century. Unlike other peoples who established quasi-states in the Roman provinces, the Croats built a respectable state organization during the 9th century.

The most important Croatian ruler of the 10th century was Tomislav. Few sources detail his rule. During this period, Constantine VII wrote about Croatia's military strength and its victory over the Bulgarians. Thomas the Archdeacon mentions Tomislav as a prince in 914, and church councils in Split in 925 and 928 also reference him. Archbishop Gregory mentions Tomislav's victory over Attila, the Hungarian king. The prevailing view is that Tomislav was crowned Croatian king after a successful war with the Hungarians, occurring before 925 when Pope John X referred to him as King of the Croats. Since Thomas the Archdeacon dates Tomislav's principality to 914, his coronation likely took place between 914 and 925.

The Duvno field, with the city of Županjac, remained under Croatian kings' control until the late 13th century, when it passed to the noble Šubić family. At the turn of the 14th century, the Šubićs, with Pope Boniface VIII's approval, established three dioceses in the Archdiocese of Split: Šibenik, Makarska, and Duvno. Their motive was to curb the Bosnian Church's influence and strengthen their own. The Diocese of Duvno was headquartered at the Church of Saint John the Baptist in Rog, near present-day Roško Polje. The bishops of Duvno often served as assistants to the archbishop of Split or as titular bishops.

By the 1320s, Duvno became part of the Banate of Bosnia when Stephen II, Ban of Bosnia took the land from the Šubićs. Duvno became part of the Western Regions, a province of the Banate of Bosnia, along with Livno and Glamoč. Despite this, the local population did not identify with the Bosnian Kingdom. In 1357, after King Tvrtko ceded Zachlumia west of the Neretva river to Hungarian and Croatian King Louis I, Duvno became the southwesternmost part of his realm.

In 1374, a conflict erupted in the village of Kolo in Duvno over loyalty to either the Bosnian or Croatian-Hungarian King. As a result, Tvrtko took control of the village, giving it to the Semković family from Usora, with King Dabiša confirming their ownership in 1395. In 1404, King Ostoja granted Duvno and Glamoč to Duke Pavle Klešić. By 1444, Duvno had become the possession of Stjepan Vukčić Kosača, Duke of the Duchy of Saint Sava.

=== Ottoman Empire ===
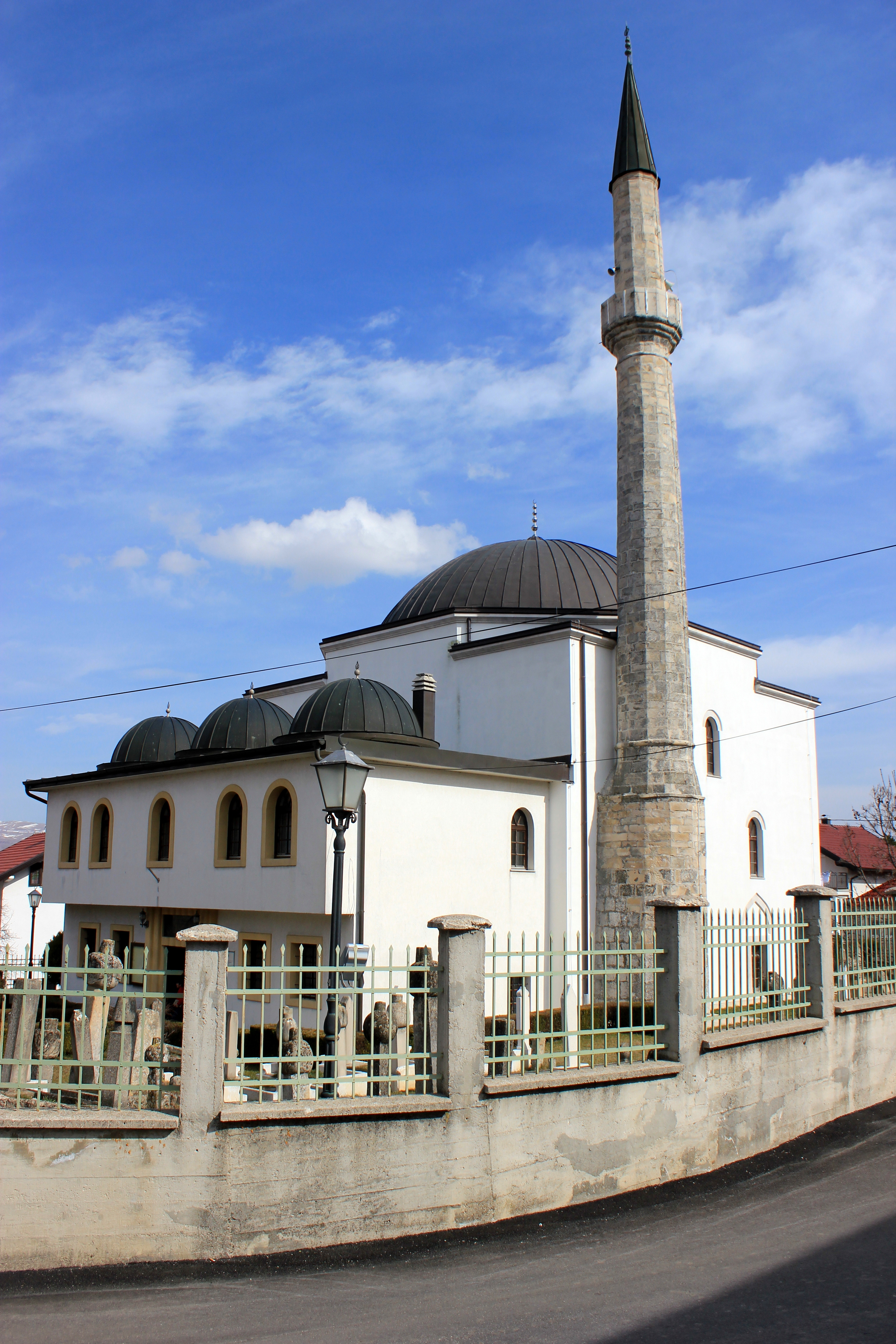
Džudža Džafer Mosque in Tomislavgrad

The Ottomans exploited the rivalry among Croatian nobles and penetrated parts of Bosnia in the 1430s. They first traversed the area of Tomislavgrad in 1449 en route to Cetina, under the control of Croatian Ban Petar Talovac, at the invitation of Stjepan Vukčić Kosača. Kosača had sought the Ottomans' aid against Duke Sladoje Semković. During their campaign, the Ottomans enslaved many and plundered the region.

After fully subjugating Bosnia in 1463, the Ottomans turned their attention to Herzegovina. Between 1468 and 1469, the territory of Završje – encompassing Glamoč, Livno, and Tomislavgrad – fell entirely under Ottoman control. The Ottomans established the Sanjak of Herzegovina in 1470, and by 1477, the Kaza of Drina, a subdivision of that sanjak, included the nahiyahs of Drežnica, Ljubuški, and Rog (the administrative center of Duvno).

For the next two centuries following Ottoman conquest, information about life in the Duvno region under Ottoman rule is scarce. The majority of the population fled from the Ottoman invaders, leaving the present-day town as a small Ottoman kasbah known as Županj-Potok. An anonymous travel writer from the late 16th century described Županj-Potok as follows:

Županj-Potok - a small place, but densely populated. There are many villages that are also very populated and have many inhabitants. Županj-Potok has about a hundred houses and villages with about a thousand chimneys (houses). They are judged by the kadi of Imotski, there is no other administrator in the place.

In the mid-16th century, the Ottomans established a qasaba in Županj-Potok. By 1576, Duvno was incorporated into the Kadiluk of Imotski, becoming a separate kadiluk before 1633. In the latter half of the 17th century, Duvno was briefly under the jurisdiction of the Sanjak of Klis before returning to the Herzegovinian Sanjak.

On May 8, 1711, Duvno became a captaincy, with Županj-Potok as its seat. Situated between the Captaincy of Livno to the north and the Captaincy of Ljubuški to the south, and bordered by the Ottoman-Venetian frontier to the west, Hasan Agha was appointed as its first captain. In 1723, the Ottomans erected a fortress in Županj-Potok, naming it Sedidžedid (the new wall) and subsequently naming the captaincy after it.

The population of Duvno endured significant hardships during the plagues of 1772, 1773, 1814, and 1815.

Hamdija Kreševljaković mentions a borough named Duvno toward the end of the 17th century and indicates that it became a kaza in the early 18th century. In the mid-17th century, Evliya Çelebi, a renowned Turkish travel writer, described Duvno as "resembling a paradise garden," situated within the Sanjak of Klis and boasting four hundred houses, a grand mosque, numerous masjids, an inn, a hamam, and ten shops. Duvno remained under Ottoman rule until 1878 when Austria-Hungary occupied Bosnia and Herzegovina following the Berlin Congress.

=== Austria-Hungary ===
During the Austro-Hungarian rule in Bosnia and Herzegovina, Tomislavgrad was known as Županjac. It served as the seat of the Kotar of Županjac, which did not include the Šujica region but did encompass the villages of Vir, Zavelim, and Zagorje in the present-day Municipality of Posušje.

=== Kingdom of Yugoslavia ===
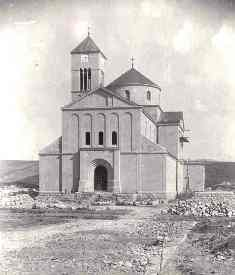
Nikola Tavelić basilica in the 1920s, when it was called Saint Cyril and Saint Methodius basilica

On 5 October 1918, representatives of Croats, Slovenes, and Serbs in Austria-Hungary established the National Council of the State of Slovenes, Croats, and Serbs. This state merged with the Kingdom of Serbia and the Kingdom of Montenegro on 1 December 1918, forming the new entity, the Kingdom of Serbs, Croats, and Slovenes.

The Srez of Županjac was divided into four municipalities: Grabovica, Vir, Županjac, and Brišnik-Oplećani, the latter existing from 1937 to 1940 before being abolished and incorporated into the Municipality of Županjac.

The provincial head of the Herzegovinian Franciscans, David Nevistić, a native of Tomislavgrad, advocated for the anti-Yugoslav political party, the Croatian People's Party (HPS), urging priests to support it. In contrast, the local parish priest, Mijo Čuić, also a Franciscan, backed a non-ideological group, the Croatian Farmers' Party (HTS). The HPS sought to establish branches in the Srez of Županjac, organizing in villages such as Vir, Vinica, Grabovica, Roško Polje, Bukovica, and Šujica (then part of the Srez of Livno). The temporary president of the Srez of Županjac, Luka Savić, prohibited them from holding political meetings.

Following new legislation, the Srez of Županjac became part of the electoral unit of the Okrug of Travnik. In the 1920 Constitutional Assembly election, despite having 4,675 eligible voters, the HPS received only 194 votes, while the HTS secured 3,726 votes.

Several Croatian parties, including the Croatian Republican Peasant Party led by Stjepan Radić, formed a coalition known as the Croatian Bloc. The HTS organized a political gathering in Županjac, where Franciscan Jako Pašalić from Livno was a speaker. Pašalić frequently visited Županjac for political reasons, though these efforts proved unsuccessful as local support for Franciscan-led politics waned. In the 1923 parliamentary election, the HTS candidate received only 31 votes, while the HPS garnered 68 votes. The HRSS won 3,847 votes.

In the subsequent parliamentary election in 1925, the HRSS once again dominated the Kotar of Županjac, securing 3,938 votes out of 4,737, with the HPS receiving a mere 23 votes. Despite disagreements over the Vidovdan Constitution and the Karađorđević dynasty, Radić remained a popular figure in the Srez of Županjac. In the fall of 1926, he received a warm welcome there, with thousands greeting him in Šujica and tens of thousands attending his public meeting the following day.

In 1928, King Alexander had a third son and named him Tomislav after Tomislav of Croatia, in an attempt to placate the Croats. Šimun Ančić led a delegation from Županjac to petition Alexander to rename the srez to Tomislavgrad, but Alexander omitted the reference to Tomislav of Croatia from his decree.

Political setbacks allowed Čuić to focus on cultural endeavors. With assistance from the Brethren of the Croatian Dragon, he laid the foundation for the Catholic basilica on 8 July 1924. Architect Stjepan Podhorsky oversaw the project. By 1926, construction was ongoing, prompting the establishment of a Central Committee in Zagreb to raise funds. The basilica's exterior was completed in 1932. To raise additional funds, Podhorsky initiated the establishment of the Club of Cyril-Methodian Masons in Zagreb, affiliated with the Brethren of the Croatian Dragon.

In the autumn of 1929, the Srez of Županjac became part of the Littoral Banovina, under the leadership of Ivo Tartaglia, who opposed the basilica project.

Although construction of the basilica was ongoing, it was consecrated on 29 September 1940, attended by approximately 8,000 people. Bishop Alojzije Mišić of Mostar-Duvno presided over the ceremony, assisted by Franciscan Krešimir Pandžić.

In 1937, the Municipality of Brišnik-Oplećani was separated from the Municipality of Tomislavgrad to maintain the dominance of the Yugoslav Radical Union (JRZ) in the Srez of Tomislavgrad. Following this decision, the Municipality of Tomislavgrad comprised only the town itself, with the rest of the territory incorporated into the newly formed Municipality of Brišnik-Oplećani. After the Srez of Tomislavgrad became part of the Banovina of Croatia in 1939, the Municipality of Brišnik-Oplećani was dissolved in 1940 and merged into the Municipality of Tomislavgrad.

=== Independent State of Croatia ===
After the collapse of the Kingdom of Yugoslavia and the establishment of the German-Italian puppet state, the Independent State of Croatia (NDH) on 10 April 1941, the NDH was divided by a demarcation line, with one zone controlled by the Italians and the other by the Germans. Tomislavgrad fell under the Italian demarcation zone.

The NDH was administratively divided into 22 grand counties. The Kotar of Tomislavgrad was part of the Grand County of Pliva-Rama. The Kotar of Tomislavgrad was further subdivided into several municipalities, including the urban center - the Municipality of Tomislavgrad.

The first district president was Šime Bančić from Split. However, due to his opposition to the Ustaše government, he was quickly relocated to Livno. Bančić was succeeded by Tomo Maleš from Sinj, who continued the policy of his predecessor. He was soon recalled to Zagreb and then sent to Sarajevo, where he was arrested and killed. In the summer of 1941, Tomislavgrad gained its third district president - Tripalo.

Alongside the civil authorities, the Ustaše established their own authority. The head of the Ustaše for the District of Tomislavgrad was logornik Jozo Brstilo, while the Ustaše organization at the municipal level was headed by tabornik Bajro Tanović, originally from Gacko. The head of the police in Tomislavgrad was Josip Antić from Ključ. The Italian occupation government disallowed their presence in Tomislavgrad until the signing of the Treaty of Rome on 18 May 1941, after which they were allowed to take control of Tomislavgrad.

Immediately after the establishment of the NDH, the Ustaše in Tomislavgrad, led by Brstilo and Tanović, organized the persecution of local Serbs. The Communist Party of Yugoslavia's (KPJ) local committee in Livno was in charge of the District of Tomislavgrad and organized the first Partisan units. Fearing the spread of rebellion, the Italians once again occupied Tomislavgrad in September 1941 and took control of political and military affairs until June 1942. While the NDH civil authorities remained active, the Ustaše organization was expelled from Tomislavgrad.

During the second Italian occupation, the communists managed to expand the number of partisans and their activities. The KPJ Livno was part of the Communist Party of Croatia's branch for the region of Dalmatia. Thus, the Partisans of Tomislavgrad were directly subordinated to the communist leadership from Croatia. The territory of the Kotar of Tomislavgrad was part of the Fourth Operational Zone of Croatia.

=== Socialist Yugoslavia ===
After the war, the Srez of Duvno became a part of the newly-established Federal Bosnia and Herzegovina and in 1945 became a part of the Okrug of Travnik. The seat of the srez was in the town of Duvno, and it included the following local communities:

- Mrkodol, which included the villages of Mesihovina, Mrkodol, and Bukovica
- Brišnik, which included the villages of Brišnik, Cebara, Omerovići, and Kovači
- Borčani, which included the villages of Borčani, Kongora, Omolje, Seonica, and Crvenice
- Jošanica, which included the villages of Stipanići, Jošanica, Podgaj, and Kolo
- Eminovo Selo, which included the villages of Blažuj, Eminovo Selo, Mokronoge, and Luk
- Letka, which included the villages of Oplećani, Vedašić, Letka, and Kuk
- Mandino Selo, which included the villages of Lipa, Mandino Selo, Rašćani, and Srđani
- Prisoje, which included the villages of Prisoje and Vrilo
- Grabovica, which included the villages of Grabovica, Dobrići, Korita, and Zidine
- Renići, which included the villages of Bukova Gora, Kazaginac, Renići, Rašeljke, Liskovača, and Prisika
- Zaljut, which included the villages of Mijakovo Polje, Zaljut, and Rošnjače
- Hambari, which included the villages of Vojkovići, Radoši, Hambari, and Roško Polje
- Zaljuće, which included the villages of Vranjača, Kosnice, Krnjin, and Zaljuće
- Vinica, which included the villages of Vinica and Pasić
- Gornje Ravno, which included the villages of Gornje Ravno, Donje Ravno, Mušić, and Zvirnjača.

In 1950, the Srez of Duvno became a part of the Okrug of Mostar. In 1952, the okrugs were abolished, and the country was divided into 66 srezs, one of which was Duvno.

In mid-1955, the country was divided into 15 srezs, and Duvno became a municipality within the Srez of Livno. In 1962, the number of srezs was reduced to 6, and the Municipality of Duvno, with 61 settlements, became a part of the Srez of Mostar. In 1966, the srezs were abolished.

== Geography ==
=== Location ===
Considering the geographical and morphological affiliation and distribution of the area, the Municipality of Tomislavgrad occupies, we can classify it in the area of high and low mountainous Herzegovina. It covers an area of 965,771,139 m2 (966 km2) and is divided into a total of 47 cadastral municipalities, 29 local communities, and 60 settlements. The total length of the border is 196.5 km, namely: with the City of Livno – 39.5 km, with the Municipality of Kupres – 30.5 km, with the Municipality of Posušje - 53.6 km, with the Municipality of Prozor-Rama – 36.3 km, with the Municipality of Jablanica – 16.3 km, and with Croatia – 20.3 km.

Situated in the southwestern part of Bosnia and Herzegovina, the Municipality of Tomislavgrad is located in the southern part of Canton 10, and is one of the 6 municipalities of Cant 10, right next to the border with Croatia and the Dalmatian hinterland (3 border crossings). It serves as a connection between Bosnia, Dalmatia, and Herzegovina, and simultaneously, it is the hub of the travel routes Mostar – Banja Luka and Split – Sarajevo. Via the international border crossing near Kamensko, the Adriatic highway is accessible in less than an hour, providing a direct connection with the countries of Western Europe.

Encompassing a large part of the karst area and four karst fields: Buško Blato (700-750 m.a.s.l.); Roško and Duvanjsko polje (860-900 m.a.s.l.) and Šuičko polje (about 920 m.a.s.l.), the Municipality of Tomislavgrad boasts significant geographical features. The plateaus of Vinica (600-650 m.a.s.l.), the Šuica plateau (950-1000 m.a.s.l.) and the Blidinje Lake area (about 1200 m.a.s.l.) add to the distinctive landscape of this municipality.

This area hosts two lakes, the artificial reservoir Buško Lake in the extreme western part of Livanjsko polje and the lake of glacial origin in the northeastern part of the municipality of Blidinje. Despite being in a karst area, around 600 km2 of pastures, arable fields, and meadows exist in the municipality of Tomislavgrad, owing to the presence of karst fields.

=== Settlements ===
• Baljci • Blažuj • Bogdašić • Borčani • Bukova Gora • Bukovica • Cebara • Crvenice • Ćavarov Stan • Dobrići • Donji Brišnik • Eminovo Selo • Galečić • Gornja Prisika • Gornji Brišnik • Grabovica • Jošanica • Kazaginac • Kolo • Kongora • Korita • Kovači • Krnjin • Kuk • Letka • Lipa • Liskovača • Lug • Mandino Selo • Mesihovina • Mijakovo Polje • Mokronoge • Mrkodol • Omerovići • Omolje • Oplećani • Pasić • Podgaj • Prisoje • Radoši • Rašćani • Rašeljke • Roško Polje • Renići • Rošnjače • Sarajlije • Seonica • Srđani • Stipanjići • Šujica • Tomislavgrad • Vedašić • Vinica • Vojkovići • Vranjače • Vrilo • Zaljiće • Zaljut • Zidine

== Governance ==
The executive branch is the municipal president, while the legislative branch is the municipal council. The current mayor is Ivan Buntić of the HNP.

== Economy ==
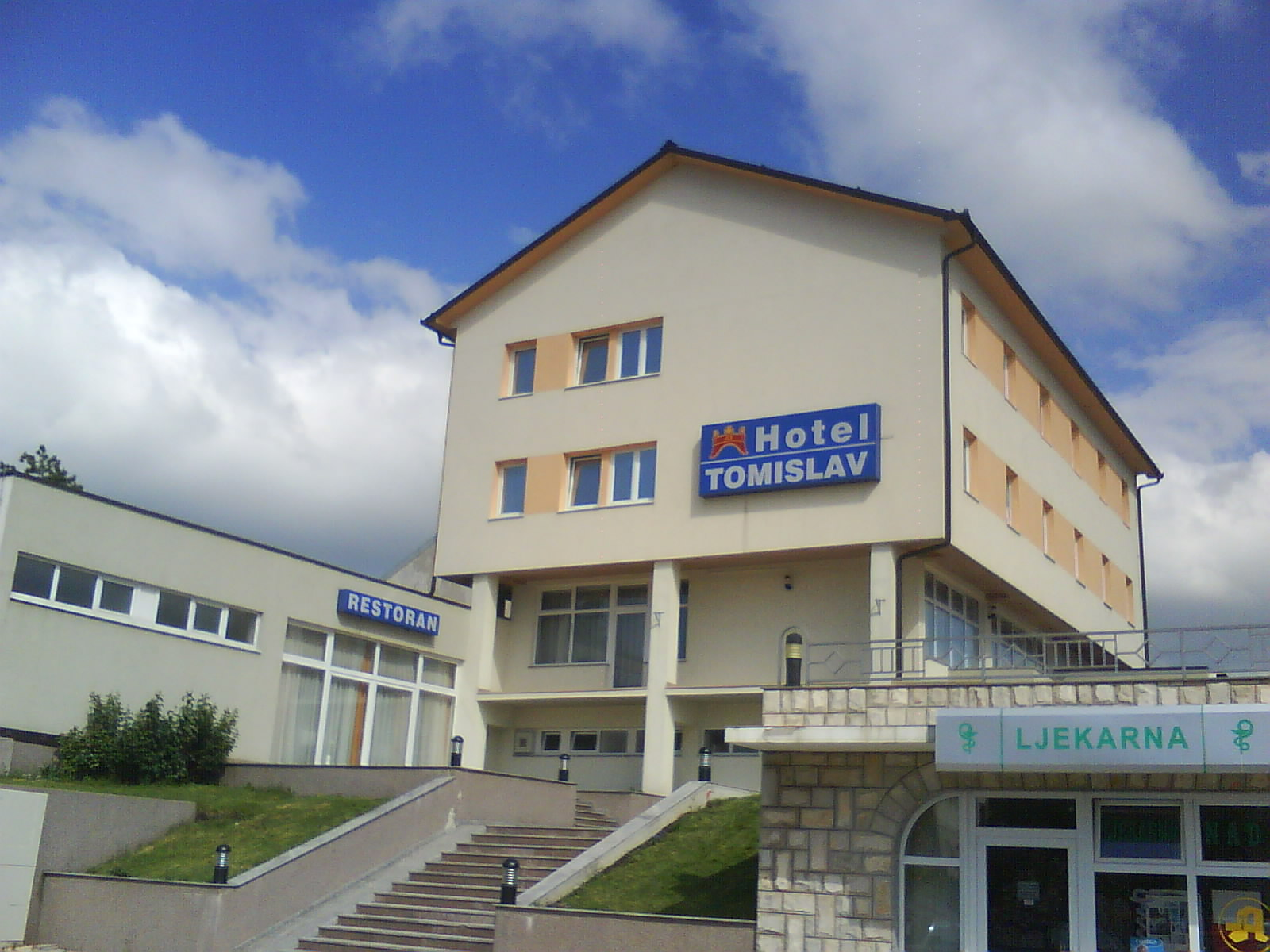
Hotel Tomislav in Tomislavgrad

Tomislavgrad today is in a very hard economic situation. Many people emigrated from it in the 1960s and 1970s, but mostly during war in the 1990s. Most went to Croatia (mostly Zagreb), Western Europe (Germany), and Australia. Among the companies active in the city there are couple big companies as "Kapis Tomislavgrad","Kamensko d.o.o."and some transport and construction companies.

== Demographics ==
=== Population ===
Population of settlements – Tomislavgrad municipality
	Settlement	1961.	1971.	1981.	1991.	2013.
	Total	33,046	33,135	30,666	30,009	33,032
1	Blažuj				325	332
2	Bobara					236
3	Bogdašić				404	346
4	Borčani				759	828
5	Bukova Gora				205	311
6	Bukovica				962	892
7	Ćavarov Stan				66	343
8	Cebara				139	222
9	Crvenice				773	997
10	Dobrići				481	446
11	Donji Brišnik				866	790
12	Eminovo Selo				674	595
13	Galečić				280	279
14	Grabovica				350	543
15	Jošanica				216	214
16	Kazaginac				301	277
17	Kolo				636	998
18	Kongora				866	862
19	Korita				179	200
20	Kovači				366	352
21	Kuk				207	232
22	Letka				701	551
23	Lipa				349	276
24	Liskovača				201	248
25	Lug				266	243
26	Mandino Selo				453	449
27	Mesihovina				964	978
28	Mijakovo Polje				184	232
29	Mokronoge				550	548
30	Mrkodol				1,091	999
31	Omerovići				321	242
32	Omolje				670	656
33	Oplećani				424	376
34	Pasić				150	250
35	Prisoje				1,150	1,107
36	Rašeljke				430	383
37	Roško Polje				1,158	1,000
38	Sarajlije				413	460
39	Seonica				395	421
40	Srđani				284	325
41	Stipanjići				1,249	1,167
42	Šuica				1,446	1,758
43	Tomislavgrad	1,986	3,265	4,231	5,012	5,760
44	Vedašić				658	547
45	Vinica				412	718
46	Vojkovići				337	288
47	Vrilo				169	349

=== Ethnic composition ===
Ethnic composition
	2013	1991	1981	1971	1961	1953
Total	33,032 (100,0%)	30,009 (100,0%)	30,666 (100,0%)	33,135 (100,0%)	33,046 (100,0%)	27,610 (100,0%)
Croats	29,006 (91,81%)	25,976 (86,56%)	26,712 (87,11%)	29,272 (88,34%)	29,704 (89,89%)	25,187 (91,22%)
Muslims/Bosniaks	2,472 (7,82%)	3,148 (10,49%)	2,895 (9,44%)	2,760 (8,33%)	1,828 (5,53%)	
Serbs	22 (0,07%)	576 (1,92%)	671 (2,19%)	970 (2,93%)	1,239 (3,75%)	948 (3,43%)
Others	92 (0,04%)	309 (0,67%)	388 (0,23%)	133 (0,12%)	275 (0,22%)	1475 (5,34%)

== Sources ==
- Krišto, Jure (2000). "Duvanjski kraj kroz povijest" [The region of Duvno through history]. In Krišto, Jure (ed.). Duvanjski zbornik [The collection of papers of Duvno] (in Croatian). Zagreb-Tomislavgrad: Hrvatski institut za povijest–Naša ognjišta–Zajednica Duvnjaka Tomislavgrad. ISBN 9536324253.
- Velagić, Adnan (2013). "Administrativno-teritorijalne promjene u Hercegovini od 1945. do 1996. godine" [The administrative-territorial changes in Herzegovina from 1945 to 1990]. Prilozi (in Bosnian). 42: 189–205.
