= Mokronoge, Tomislavgrad =

Mokronoge
- Village
- Location within Bosnia and Herzegovina
- Coordinates: 43°45′51″N 17°13′33″E
- Country: Bosnia and Herzegovina
- Entity: Federation of Bosnia and Herzegovina
- Canton: Canton 10
- Municipality: Tomislavgrad

Area
  - Total: 12.94 km^{2} (5.00 sq mi)

Population (2013)
  - Total: 548
  - Density: 42.3/km^{2} (110/sq mi)
- Time zone: UTC+1 (CET)
  - Summer (DST): UTC+2 (CEST)

Mokronoge is a village in the Municipality of Tomislavgrad in Canton 10 of the Federation of Bosnia and Herzegovina, an entity of Bosnia and Herzegovina.

== History ==
=== Roman period ===
Prior to the Roman conquest, the territory of the present-day Mokronoge was a part of the centre of the Dalmatae, a group of Illyrian tribes.

Mokronoge were part of the Roman municipium of Delminium. Delminium became a municipium during the reign of Emperor Hadrian in the first half of the 2nd century. The municipium was headed by the municipal council, whose members also came from the present-day Mokronoge. In the municipium of Delminium Jupiter was the most worshiped deity, including the present-day village of Mokronoge, which is one of the sites in the area of this municipality where an altar to the god Jupiter was found.

=== Ottoman period ===
After the Cretan War (1645–1669) between the Republic of Venice and the Ottoman Empire, the bishop of Makarska Marijan Lišnjić made a visit to the parish of Duvno, of which Mokronoge was a part of, and reported that although the parish of Duvno encompasses numerous villages, none of them has a church. The old churches were destroyed, while the Catholics weren't allowed to build the new ones. On the other hand, the Muslims had a mosque in the town of Županj Potok. The population in the region was small. The Catholics were a minority, but there weren't a lot of Muslims either. The parish priest for the Catholics in the region at the time was their local Ivan Ančić.

In 1743, the apostolic vicar of Bosnia, Bishop Pavao Dragičević ordered a census to be made, which found Mokronoge, at the time part of the parish of Duvno, uninhabited, as the town of Županj Potok itself with other nearby villages. His successor Bishop Marijan Bogdanović conducted a census in 1768, which saw a mild increase in population in the parish of Dunvo. The 19th century was as bad for the Catholics in Bosnia and Herzegovina, as the previous, marked by wars and rebellions. The situation for the Catholics of Duvno was the same. At the time, they had only one parish seated in Bukovica. Mijo Čuić, the local parish priest, decided to move the seat to Seonica in 1806. However, as the parish was geographically too large, he divided it into two and established a chaplaincy in Mokronoge in 1829, which in 1839 became a parish in its own right. However, in 1861, the seat of the newly-established parish was moved to the town of Županj Potok.

Franciscan Petar Bakula wrote two schematisms, one for the Franciscan Province of Herzegovina in 1867, and the other for the Apostolic Vicariate of Herzegovina in 1873. According to these two schematisms, in 1867, Mokronoge had 82 Catholics, and in 1873, their number rose to 110.

== Demographics ==
According to the 2013 census, its population was 548.

Ethnicity in 2013
Ethnicity	Number	Percentage
Croats	295	53.8%
Bosniaks	253	46.2%
Total	548	100%

== Bibliography ==
- Ethnicity/National Affiliation, Religion and Mother Tongue (PDF). Sarajevo: Agency for Statistics of Bosnia and Herzegovina. 2019.
- Knezović, Pavao (2000). "Duvanjski kraj u franjevačkim šematizmima" [The region of Duvno in the Franciscan schematisms]. In Krišto, Jure (ed.). Duvanjski zbornik [The collection of papers of Duvno] (in Croatian). Zagreb-Tomislavgrad: Hrvatski institut za povijest–Naša ognjišta–Zajednica Duvnjaka Tomislavgrad. ISBN 9536324253.
- Krišto, Jure (2000). "Duvanjski kraj kroz povijest" [The region of Duvno through history]. In Krišto, Jure (ed.). Duvanjski zbornik [The collection of papers of Duvno] (in Croatian). Zagreb-Tomislavgrad: Hrvatski institut za povijest–Naša ognjišta–Zajednica Duvnjaka Tomislavgrad. ISBN 9536324253.
- Nikić, Andrija (2000). "Katolici duvanjskog kraja do osmanske okupacije" [The Catholics of the region of Duvno until the Ottoman occupation]. In Krišto, Jure (ed.). Duvanjski zbornik [The collection of papers of Duvno] (in Croatian). Zagreb-Tomislavgrad: Hrvatski institut za povijest–Naša ognjišta–Zajednica Duvnjaka Tomislavgrad. ISBN 9536324253.
- Pandžić, Bazilije (2000). "Crkveni ustroj duvanjskog kraja od propasti Bosne do XIX. stoljeća" [The Church Organisation of the Region of Duvno from the Collapse of Bosnia to the 19th Century]. In Krišto, Jure (ed.). Duvanjski zbornik [The collection of papers of Duvno] (in Croatian). Zagreb-Tomislavgrad: Hrvatski institut za povijest–Naša ognjišta–Zajednica Duvnjaka Tomislavgrad. ISBN 9536324253.
- Soldo, Josip Ante (2000). "Stanovništvo duvanjskog kraja u XVII. i XVIII. stoljeću" [The population of the region of Duvno in the XVII and the XVIII century]. In Krišto, Jure (ed.). Duvanjski zbornik [The collection of papers of Duvno] (in Croatian). Zagreb-Tomislavgrad: Hrvatski institut za povijest–Naša ognjišta–Zajednica Duvnjaka Tomislavgrad. ISBN 9536324253.
- Škegro, Ante (2000). "Duvanjski prostori u antici" [The territories of Duvno in the antiquity]. In Krišto, Jure (ed.). Duvanjski zbornik [The collection of papers of Duvno] (in Croatian). Zagreb-Tomislavgrad: Hrvatski institut za povijest–Naša ognjišta–Zajednica Duvnjaka Tomislavgrad. ISBN 9536324253.
