= Ćavarov Stan =

Village in Bosnia and Herzegovina

- Village
- Etymology: Ćavar and Croatian: stan ("rearers settlement")
- Location within Bosnia and Herzegovina
- Coordinates: 43°41′41″N 17°14′29″E
- Country: Bosnia and Herzegovina
- Entity: Federation of Bosnia and Herzegovina
- Canton: Canton 10
- Municipality: Tomislavgrad

Population (2013)
  - Total: 343
- Time zone: UTC+1 (CET)
  - Summer (DST): UTC+2 (CEST)

Ćavarov Stan is a village in the Municipality of Tomislavgrad in Canton 10 of the Federation of Bosnia and Herzegovina, an entity of Bosnia and Herzegovina.

== Etymology ==
Ćavarov is a possessive adjective form of the surname Ćavar, the common surname of the majority of inhabitants of the village. The surname itself is of Venetian origin, meaning a one-year-old ram. Stan in Croatian has multiple meanings, but in the name of the village it refers to a "rearers settlement with huts and sheepfolds during summer pasture".

== Geography ==
Ćavarov Stan is located at the centre of Duvanjsko polje. In the area of Glibina, between Kolo and Ćavarov Stan, there is a hydro-melioration system of canals, on about 800 ha, for drainage of waters in the riverbed of the river Šuica.

== History ==
Transhumance in the 1930s, when the village was founded, was still common in the region of Dinaric Alps, where Ćavarov Stan is located. Most of its inhabitants hale from Kazaginac, a village near the Buško Blato lake, who came to the area of Ćavarov Stan annually during the summer pastures. The majority of the first settlers were surnamed Ćavar, after whom the village was named.

Until the 1953 census, Ćavarov Stan was administratively part of Duvno, the urban centre. However, after the census, it became a separate settlement.

During the period of the socialist Yugoslavia, the village was home to the Review of Agricultural Products and the Review of the Cultural-Artist Work.

== Demographics ==
According to the 2013 census, its population was 343, all Croats.

Ethnic composition
	2013	1991	1981	1971	1961
Croats	343 (100.0%)	66 (100.0%)	75 (100.0%)	74 (100.0%)	99 (100,0%)
Total	343 (100.0%)	66 (100.0%)	75 (100.0%)	74 (100.0%)	99 (100.0%)

== Bibliography ==
=== Books ===
- Ethnicity/National Affiliation, Religion and Mother Tongue (PDF). Sarajevo: Agency for Statistics of Bosnia and Herzegovina. 2019.
- Ivanković, Ante (2001). Duvanjska prezimena [Surnames of Duvno]. Tomislavgrad-Omiš: Naša Ognjišta-Franjo Kluz. ISBN 9536771209.
- Popis stanovništva 1953. Podaci za naselja prema upravnoj podeli 30.6.1958. Osnovni podaci o stanovništvu [The 1953 population census. The data for settlements according to the administrative division of 30.6.1958. The basic data on population] (in Serbian). Vol. 15. Belgrade: Savezni zavod za statistiku. 1960.
- Prostorni plan za područje Hercegbosanske županije za period 2008-2028. godine: nacrt [Spatial plan for the area of the County of Herzeg-Bosnia for the period of 2008-2028: a draft] (in Croatian). Livno: Vlada Hercegbosanske županije. 2014.

=== Journals ===
- Lukač, Zrinka; Vladić-Mandarić, Lidija (2020). "Evaluacija kulturno-umjetničkog amaterizma Tomislavgrada" (PDF). Suvremena pitanja. XV (30): 124–147.

=== Websites ===
- "Stan". Hrvatski jezični portal. Znanje-Srca.
