= Seonica =

Seonica may refer to:

- Seonica, Konjic, a village in Bosnia and Herzegovina
- Seonica, Tomislavgrad, a village in Bosnia and Herzegovina
