= Kazaginac =

- Village
- Etymology: Ottoman Turkish: kaza ('district') and Ottoman Turkish: agha ('chief')
- Interactive map of Kazaginac
- Kazaginac within Bosnia and Herzegovina
- Coordinates: 43°36′50.90″N 17°01′0.80″E
- Country: Bosnia and Herzegovina
- Entity: Federation of Bosnia and Herzegovina
- Canton: Canton 10
- Municipality: Tomislavgrad

Area
  - Total: 5.56 km^{2} (2.15 sq mi)
- Elevation: 716 m (2,349 ft)

Population (2013)
  - Total: 277
  - Density: 49.8/km^{2} (129/sq mi)
- Time zone: UTC+1 (CET)
  - Summer (DST): UTC+2 (CEST)
- Postal code: 80240

Kazaginac is a village in the Municipality of Tomislavgrad in Canton 10 of the Federation of Bosnia and Herzegovina, an entity of Bosnia and Herzegovina. The village is also part of the smaller Buško Blato micro-region, consisting of those villages and settlements surrounding the lake known as Buško Lake. According to the 2013 census, there were 277 inhabitants.

== Etymology ==
The roots of the name Kazaginac are of Ottoman Turkish origin. The word kaza means "district" while agha refers to "chief". Kazaginac thus refers to the property owned by the kazaga, a reference to Ottoman times where the landholding class was usually members of the ruling Muslim population.

== History ==
The road passing through Kazaginac is an ancient route dating back to Roman times. It formed part of the central road network connected to the magistral road between Salona and Hedum castellum – Argentaria, constructed under the authority of the governor of Dalmatia, Publius Cornelius Dolabella in 18/19 AD.

Southwest of the village, at the Glavina locality, archaeologists have identified remnants of a stone-built structure. Earlier surveys recorded five Roman milestone fragments from the 3rd century AD at this site, along with Roman coins.

Above the Šarića Kuće area, a stone mound is visible, possibly linked to prehistoric or Roman-era burial practices. Near the Catholic cemetery lies the archaeological site known as Crkvina, which may indicate the remains of an early Christian structure or settlement.

In literature, Kazaginac is mentioned very late in history. The name was first mentioned in 1844 when 83 people were living in 7 houses. By 1867, the population rose to 129 people.

During the socialist Yugoslavia, until 1953, the administrative territory of Kazaginac encompassed a much wider area of surrounding villages. In addition to Kazaginac itself, it included Bukova Gora, Korita, Liskovača, Mijakovo Polje, Pasič, Rašeljke, Renići, Rošnjače, Vinica, Zaljut and Zidine. Together, this administrative area covered 837 households and 5323 people.

Today, the following hamlets make up the village of Kazaginac: Blaževići, Ćurkovići, Galići, Kurtovina, Renića Dolac, Vlaka and Vuletići. Historically, this village has traditionally been populated by ethnic Croats of the Catholic faith.

== Geography ==
Kazaginac is situated along the southern shore of Buško Lake (Buško jezero), an artificial reservoir created following the 1974 construction of a dam in the village. The settlement lies at an elevation of 716 metres above sea level. It offers panoramic views of the lake and surrounding karst terrain.

The village is located within 5 kilometres of two Croatian border crossings — Kamensko and Aržano — providing convenient access to the Dalmatian hinterland and enhancing its role in regional mobility.

A notable local feature is Marinovac Beach, a popular lakeside area located on the Buško Blato basin.

== Infrastructure and Services ==
OŠ Stjepan Radić, opened in 1972, is the only elementary school in Kazaginac. Today, it acts as a satellite campus to the larger school of the same name in Prisoje.

Kazaginac is also notable for the construction of the Kazaginac Dam, completed in 1974 as part of a regional hydroelectric initiative. The dam led to the formation of Buško Lake, one of the largest artificial reservoirs in Southeast Europe, designed to regulate water flow for hydroelectric power plants along the Cetina River in Croatia. The project significantly reshaped the local landscape and contributed to the village’s strategic importance in regional water management.

== Demographics ==
Due to the absence of consistent state census records during the Ottoman period, demographic data for Kazaginac prior to the 20th century relies heavily on Catholic parish records. The most detailed source is the Status Animarum (parish census), maintained by successive ecclesiastical administrations.

Prior to 1830, Kazaginac was administered by priests from the parish of Vidoši, within the broader ecclesiastical territory known as Gornje Polje. In 1831, it became part of the newly formed chaplaincy of Grabovica, which was elevated to full parish status in 1838. From 1885 to 1934, the village was administered by the parish of Vinica, and since 1934, it has belonged to the parish of Rašeljke.

The following table summarizes household and population counts from 1833 to 1979:

Population and Housing in Kazaginac (1833–1979)
Year	Houses	People
1833	5	66
1844	7	83
1847	8	97
1850	9	92
1854	9	112
1858	10	107
1865	12	139
1867	12	129
1881	16	141
1889	24	171
1892	26	199 (Note: The 1892 totals include both Kazaginac (13 houses, 119 people) and Kurtovina (13 houses, 80 people).)
1935	N/A	330 (Note: The 1935 population total includes Kazaginac (228 people) and the hamlets of Kurtovina and Galići (102 people). Household numbers were not recorded.)
1979	63	313 (Note: The 1979 totals include Kazaginac (32 houses, 162 people), Kurtovina (17 houses, 73 people), Galići (9 houses, 46 people), and Renića Dolac (5 houses, 32 people).)

According to the 2013 census, the population was 277.

Ethnic group	Population 1961	%	Population 1971	%	Population 1981	%	Population 1991	%	Population 2013	%
Croats	505	94.04	441	98.88	326	98.49	299	99.34	274	98.92
Others	32	5.99	5	1.12	5	1.51	2	0.66	3	1.08
Total	537		446		331		301		277	
