= Vedašić =

Vedašić may refer to:

- Vedašić, Tomislavgrad, a village in Bosnia and Herzegovina
- Vedašić, Udbina, a village in Croatia
