= Brišnik =

Brišnik may refer to:

- Donji Brišnik, a village near Tomislavgrad, Bosnia and Herzegovina
- Gornji Brišnik, a village near Tomislavgrad, Bosnia and Herzegovina
