= Blažuj =

Blažuj may refer to:

- Blažuj, Tomislavgrad, a village in Bosnia and Herzegovina
- Blažuj, Ilidža, a village near Ilidža, Bosnia and Herzegovina
