= Rašćani =

Rašćani may refer to:

- Rašćani, Sveti Ivan Žabno, a village near Sveti Ivan Žabno in Croatia
- Rašćani, Tomislavgrad, a village near Tomislavgrad in Bosnia and Herzegovina
