= Vojkovići =

Vojkovići may refer to:

== Bosnia and Herzegovina ==
- Vojkovići, Istočno Sarajevo
- Vojkovići, Tomislavgrad

== Montenegro ==
- Vojkovići, Cetinje
- Vojkovići, Kolašin
