= Gornja Prisika =

- Village
- Location within Bosnia and Herzegovina
- Coordinates: 43°37′N 17°00′E
- Country: Bosnia and Herzegovina
- Entity: Federation of Bosnia and Herzegovina
- Canton: Canton 10
- Municipality: Tomislavgrad

Area
  - Total: 2.99 km^{2} (1.15 sq mi)

Population (2013)
  - Total: 71
  - Density: 24/km^{2} (62/sq mi)
- Time zone: UTC+1 (CET)
  - Summer (DST): UTC+2 (CEST)

Gornja Prisika is a village in the Municipality of Tomislavgrad in Canton 10 of the Federation of Bosnia and Herzegovina, an entity of Bosnia and Herzegovina. It is close to the Croatia-Bosnia-Herzegovina border crossing.

== Demographics ==
According to the 2013 census, its population was 71, all Croats.

== Bibliography ==
- Ethnicity/National Affiliation, Religion and Mother Tongue (PDF). Sarajevo: Agency for Statistics of Bosnia and Herzegovina. 2019.
