= Liskovača =

- Village
- Location within Bosnia and Herzegovina
- Coordinates: 43°38′N 16°59′E
- Country: Bosnia and Herzegovina
- Entity: Federation of Bosnia and Herzegovina
- Canton: Canton 10
- Municipality: Tomislavgrad

Area
  - Total: 18.19 km^{2} (7.02 sq mi)

Population (2013)
  - Total: 248
  - Density: 13.6/km^{2} (35.3/sq mi)
- Time zone: UTC+1 (CET)
  - Summer (DST): UTC+2 (CEST)

Liskovača is a village in the Municipality of Tomislavgrad in Canton 10 of the Federation of Bosnia and Herzegovina, an entity of Bosnia and Herzegovina.

== Demographics ==
According to the 2013 census, its population was 248.

Ethnicity in 2013
Ethnicity	Number	Percentage
Croats	240	96.8%
other/undeclared	8	3.2%
Total	248	100%

== Bibliography ==
- Ethnicity/National Affiliation, Religion and Mother Tongue (PDF). Sarajevo: Agency for Statistics of Bosnia and Herzegovina. 2019.
