= Lug, Tomislavgrad =

Lug
- Village
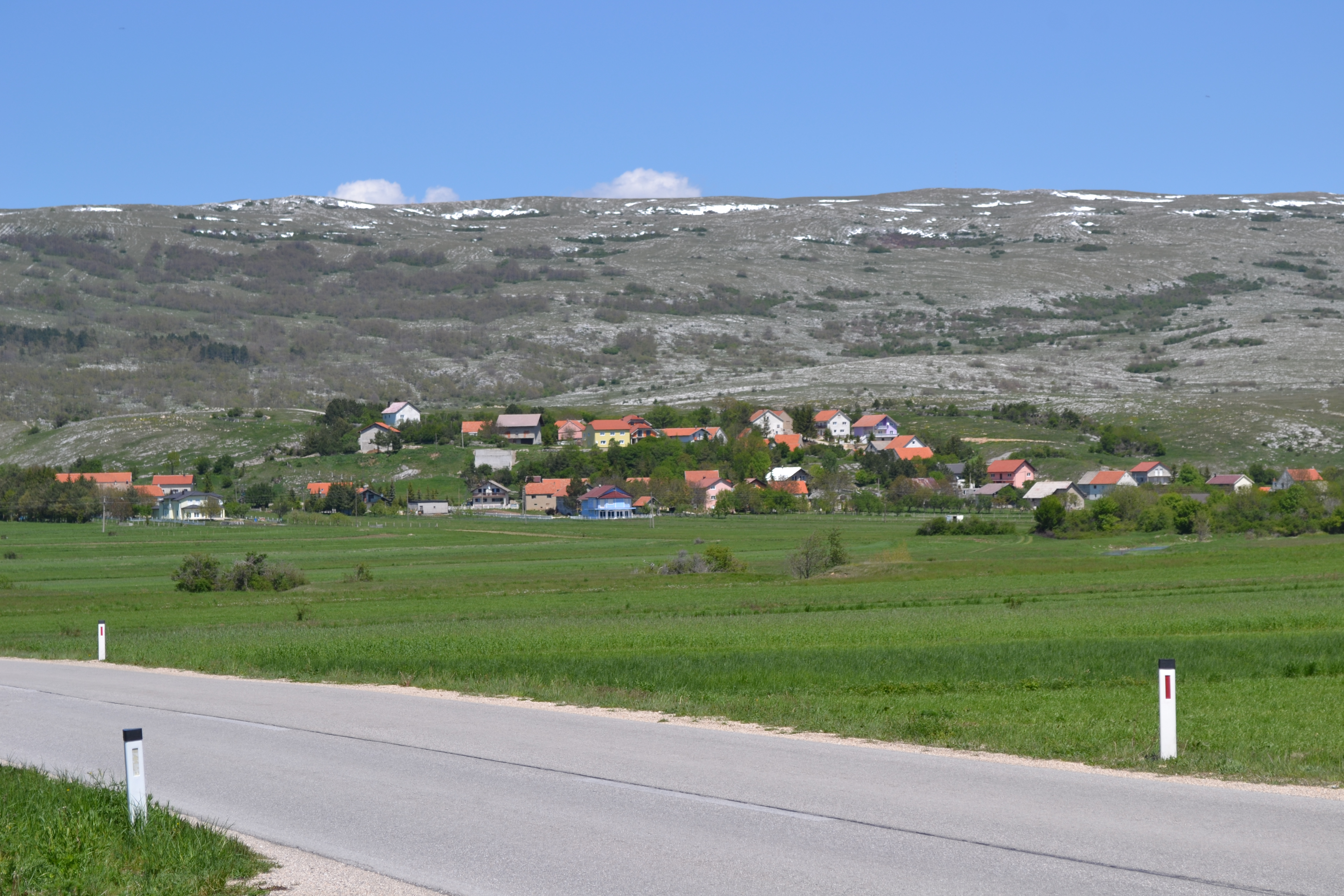
- A view of Lug

- Location within Bosnia and Herzegovina
- Coordinates: 43°45′33″N 17°14′29″E
- Country: Bosnia and Herzegovina
- Entity: Federation of Bosnia and Herzegovina
- Canton: Canton 10
- Municipality: Tomislavgrad

Area
  - Total: 11.16 km^{2} (4.31 sq mi)

Population (2013)
  - Total: 243
  - Density: 21.8/km^{2} (56.4/sq mi)
- Time zone: UTC+1 (CET)
  - Summer (DST): UTC+2 (CEST)

Lug is a village in the Municipality of Tomislavgrad in Canton 10 of the Federation of Bosnia and Herzegovina, an entity of Bosnia and Herzegovina. The majority of its inhabitants are Croats.

== Geography ==
The village is located by the mountain of Ljubuša, on the banks of the river Šujica. The first bridge over the river was built on 20 September 1986.

== Demographics ==
According to the 2013 census, its population was 243.

Ethnicity in 2013
Ethnicity	Number	Percentage
Croats	241	99.2%
Bosniaks	1	0.4%
Serbs	1	0.4%
Total	243	100%

== Bibliography ==
- Ethnicity/National Affiliation, Religion and Mother Tongue (PDF). Sarajevo: Agency for Statistics of Bosnia and Herzegovina. 2019.
