= Korita, Tomislavgrad =

Korita
- Village
- Location within Bosnia and Herzegovina
- Coordinates: 43°37′55″N 17°05′26″E
- Country: Bosnia and Herzegovina
- Entity: Federation of Bosnia and Herzegovina
- Canton: Canton 10
- Municipality: Tomislavgrad

Area
  - Total: 8.32 km^{2} (3.21 sq mi)

Population (2013)
  - Total: 200
  - Density: 24/km^{2} (62/sq mi)
- Time zone: UTC+1 (CET)
  - Summer (DST): UTC+2 (CEST)

Korita is a village in the Municipality of Tomislavgrad in Canton 10 of the Federation of Bosnia and Herzegovina, an entity of Bosnia and Herzegovina.

== Demographics ==
According to the 2013 census Korita's population was 200.

Ethnicity in 2013
Ethnicity	Number	Percentage
Croats	199	99.5%
other/undeclared	1	0.5%
Total	200	100%

== Bibliography ==
- Ethnicity/National Affiliation, Religion and Mother Tongue (PDF). Sarajevo: Agency for Statistics of Bosnia and Herzegovina. 2019.
