= Krnjin =

- Village
- Location within Bosnia and Herzegovina
- Coordinates: 43°35′N 17°09′E
- Country: Bosnia and Herzegovina
- Entity: Federation of Bosnia and Herzegovina
- Canton: Canton 10
- Municipality: Tomislavgrad

Area
  - Total: 8.17 km^{2} (3.15 sq mi)

Population (2013)
  - Total: 129
  - Density: 15.8/km^{2} (40.9/sq mi)
- Time zone: UTC+1 (CET)
  - Summer (DST): UTC+2 (CEST)

Krnjin is a village in the Municipality of Tomislavgrad in Canton 10 of the Federation of Bosnia and Herzegovina, an entity of Bosnia and Herzegovina.

== Demographics ==
According to the 2013 census, its population was 129.

Ethnicity in 2013
Ethnicity	Number	Percentage
Croats	128	99.2%
other/undeclared	1	0.8%
Total	129	100%

== Bibliography ==
- Ethnicity/National Affiliation, Religion and Mother Tongue (PDF). Sarajevo: Agency for Statistics of Bosnia and Herzegovina. 2019.
