= Omerovići, Tomislavgrad =

Omerovići
- Village
- Location within Bosnia and Herzegovina
- Coordinates: 43°39′28″N 17°12′37″E
- Country: Bosnia and Herzegovina
- Entity: Federation of Bosnia and Herzegovina
- Canton: Canton 10
- Municipality: Tomislavgrad

Area
  - Total: 6.51 km^{2} (2.51 sq mi)

Population (2013)
  - Total: 242
  - Density: 37.2/km^{2} (96.3/sq mi)
- Time zone: UTC+1 (CET)
  - Summer (DST): UTC+2 (CEST)

Omerovići is a village in the Municipality of Tomislavgrad in Canton 10 of the Federation of Bosnia and Herzegovina, an entity of Bosnia and Herzegovina.

== Demographics ==
According to the 2013 census, its population was 242.

Ethnicity in 2013
Ethnicity	Number	Percentage
Bosniaks	229	94.6%
Croats	12	5.0%
other/undeclared	1	0.4%
Total	242	100%

== Bibliography ==
- Ethnicity/National Affiliation, Religion and Mother Tongue (PDF). Sarajevo: Agency for Statistics of Bosnia and Herzegovina. 2019. Archived from the original (PDF) on 2020-07-25.
