= Renići =

- Village
- Location within Bosnia and Herzegovina
- Coordinates: 43°37′N 17°01′E
- Country: Bosnia and Herzegovina
- Entity: Federation of Bosnia and Herzegovina
- Canton: Canton 10
- Municipality: Tomislavgrad

Area
  - Total: 6.46 km^{2} (2.49 sq mi)

Population (2013)
  - Total: 143
  - Density: 22.1/km^{2} (57.3/sq mi)
- Time zone: UTC+1 (CET)
  - Summer (DST): UTC+2 (CEST)

Renići is a village in the Municipality of Tomislavgrad in Canton 10 of the Federation of Bosnia and Herzegovina, an entity of Bosnia and Herzegovina.

== Demographics ==
According to the 2013 census, its population was 143.

Ethnicity in 2013
Ethnicity	Number	Percentage
Croats	141	98.6%
Bosniaks	2	1.4%
Total	143	100%

== Bibliography ==
- Ethnicity/National Affiliation, Religion and Mother Tongue (PDF). Sarajevo: Agency for Statistics of Bosnia and Herzegovina. 2019.
