= Borčani =

- Village
- Location within Bosnia and Herzegovina
- Coordinates: 43°39′N 17°19′E
- Country: Bosnia and Herzegovina
- Entity: Federation of Bosnia and Herzegovina
- Canton: Canton 10
- Municipality: Tomislavgrad

Area
  - Total: 6.49 km^{2} (2.51 sq mi)

Population (2013)
  - Total: 828
  - Density: 128/km^{2} (330/sq mi)
- Time zone: UTC+1 (CET)
  - Summer (DST): UTC+2 (CEST)

Borčani is a village in the Municipality of Tomislavgrad in Canton 10 of the Federation of Bosnia and Herzegovina, an entity of Bosnia and Herzegovina.

== Demographics ==
According to the 2013 census, its population was 828.

Ethnicity in 2013
Ethnicity	Number	Percentage
Croats	828	100%
Serbs	0	0%
other/undeclared	0	0%
Total	828	100%

== Bibliography ==
- Ethnicity/National Affiliation, Religion and Mother Tongue (PDF). Sarajevo: Agency for Statistics of Bosnia and Herzegovina. 2019.
