= Crvenice =

- Village
- Etymology: Croatian: crvenica, lit. 'terra rossa or red soil'
- Location within Bosnia and Herzegovina
- Coordinates: 43°35′34.13″N 17°19′5.00″E
- Country: Bosnia and Herzegovina
- Entity: Federation of Bosnia and Herzegovina
- Canton: Canton 10
- Municipality: Tomislavgrad

Area
  - Total: 21.03 km^{2} (8.12 sq mi)

Population (2013)
  - Total: 997
  - Density: 47.4/km^{2} (123/sq mi)
- Time zone: UTC+1 (CET)
  - Summer (DST): UTC+2 (CEST)
- Postal code: 80240

Crvenice is a village in the Municipality of Tomislavgrad in Canton 10 of the Federation of Bosnia and Herzegovina, an entity of Bosnia and Herzegovina.

== Demographics ==
According to the 2013 census, its population was 997.

Ethnicity in 2013
Ethnicity	Number	Percentage
Croats	996	99.9%
other/undeclared	1	0.1%
Total	997	100%

== Bibliography ==
- Ethnicity/National Affiliation, Religion and Mother Tongue (PDF). Sarajevo: Agency for Statistics of Bosnia and Herzegovina. 2019.
