= Zaljiće =

- Village
- Location within Bosnia and Herzegovina
- Coordinates: 43°35′19″N 17°09′32″E
- Country: Bosnia and Herzegovina
- Entity: Federation of Bosnia and Herzegovina
- Canton: Canton 10
- Municipality: Tomislavgrad

Area
  - Total: 2.59 km^{2} (1.00 sq mi)

Population (2013)
  - Total: 70
  - Density: 27/km^{2} (70/sq mi)
- Time zone: UTC+1 (CET)
  - Summer (DST): UTC+2 (CEST)

Zaljiće is a village in the Municipality of Tomislavgrad in Canton 10 of the Federation of Bosnia and Herzegovina, an entity of Bosnia and Herzegovina.

== Demographics ==
According to the 2013 census, its population was 70, all Croats.

== Bibliography ==
- Ethnicity/National Affiliation, Religion and Mother Tongue (PDF). Sarajevo: Agency for Statistics of Bosnia and Herzegovina. 2019. Archived from the original (PDF) on 2020-07-25.
