= Mrkodol =

- Village
- Location within Bosnia and Herzegovina
- Coordinates: 43°37′49″N 17°14′29″E
- Country: Bosnia and Herzegovina
- Entity: Federation of Bosnia and Herzegovina
- Canton: Canton 10
- Municipality: Tomislavgrad

Area
  - Total: 14.60 km^{2} (5.64 sq mi)
- Elevation: 898 m (2,946 ft)

Population (2013)
  - Total: 999
  - Density: 68.4/km^{2} (177/sq mi)
- Time zone: UTC+1 (CET)
  - Summer (DST): UTC+2 (CEST)

Mrkodol is a village in the Municipality of Tomislavgrad in Canton 10 of the Federation of Bosnia and Herzegovina, an entity of Bosnia and Herzegovina.

The village is located on the edge of Duvanjsko Polje, near Tomislavgrad. The latitude of the village is 43 degrees and 37 minutes north of the equator, and the longitude is 17 degrees and 15 minutes east of the prime meridian. Its elevation is 898 meters above sea level.

Mrkodol is located along the road leading from Posušje to Tomislavgrad. Its distance from Mostar is 62 km, from Split 77 km, and from Sarajevo 89 km.

== Demographics ==
According to the 2013 census, its population was 999.

Ethnicity in 2013
Ethnicity	Number	Percentage
Croats	998	99.9%
other/undeclared	1	0.1%
Total	999	100%

== Bibliography ==
- Ethnicity/National Affiliation, Religion and Mother Tongue (PDF). Sarajevo: Agency for Statistics of Bosnia and Herzegovina. 2019.
