= Vrilo =

- Village
- Location within Bosnia and Herzegovina
- Coordinates: 43°41′N 17°07′E
- Country: Bosnia and Herzegovina
- Entity: Federation of Bosnia and Herzegovina
- Canton: Canton 10
- Municipality: Tomislavgrad

Area
  - Total: 22.15 km^{2} (8.55 sq mi)

Population (2013)
  - Total: 349
  - Density: 15.8/km^{2} (40.8/sq mi)
- Time zone: UTC+1 (CET)
  - Summer (DST): UTC+2 (CEST)

Vrilo is a village in the Municipality of Tomislavgrad in Canton 10 of the Federation of Bosnia and Herzegovina, an entity of Bosnia and Herzegovina.

== Demographics ==
According to the 2013 census, its population was 349.

Ethnicity in 2013
Ethnicity	Number	Percentage
Croats	347	99.4%
Bosniaks	1	0.3%
other/undeclared	1	0.3%
Total	349	100%

== Bibliography ==
- Ethnicity/National Affiliation, Religion and Mother Tongue (PDF). Sarajevo: Agency for Statistics of Bosnia and Herzegovina. 2019.
