= Oplećani =

- Village
- Location within Bosnia and Herzegovina
- Coordinates: 43°43′N 17°17′E
- Country: Bosnia and Herzegovina
- Entity: Federation of Bosnia and Herzegovina
- Canton: Canton 10
- Municipality: Tomislavgrad

Area
  - Total: 16.20 km^{2} (6.25 sq mi)

Population (2013)
  - Total: 376
  - Density: 23.2/km^{2} (60.1/sq mi)
- Time zone: UTC+1 (CET)
  - Summer (DST): UTC+2 (CEST)

Oplećani or Oplećane is a village in the Municipality of Tomislavgrad in Canton 10 of the Federation of Bosnia and Herzegovina, an entity of Bosnia and Herzegovina.

== Name ==
Originally, the village was called Oplećane.

== History ==
Franciscan Petar Bakula wrote two schematisms, one for the Franciscan Province of Herzegovina in 1867, and the other for the Apostolic Vicariate of Herzegovina in 1873. According to these two schematisms, in 1867, Oplećani had 25 Catholics, and in 1873, their number rose to 46.

Northeast of the village there's an Illyrian fortress, while in the Catholic and the Eastern Orthodox cemeteries there are 24 stećci, medieval tombstones.

== Population ==
Ethnic group	Population 2013	Population 1991	Population 1981	Population 1971	Population 1961
Bosniaks/Muslims	308 (81.91%)	306 (72.17%)	306 (71.50%)	299 (71.87%)	290 (66.82%)
Croats	67 (17.82%)	76 (17.92%)	73 (17.06%)	66 (15.87%)	65 (14.98%)
Serbs	0	36 (8.49%)	43 (10.05%)	50 (12.02%)	79 (18.20%)
Others or unknown	1 (0.27%)	6 (1.42%)	6 (1.40%)	1 (0.24%)	0
Total	376	424	428	416	434

== Bibliography ==
- Ethnicity/National Affiliation, Religion and Mother Tongue (PDF). Sarajevo: Agency for Statistics of Bosnia and Herzegovina. 2019.
- Knezović, Pavao (2000). "Duvanjski kraj u franjevačkim šematizmima" [The region of Duvno in the Franciscan schematisms]. In Krišto, Jure (ed.). Duvanjski zbornik [The collection of papers of Duvno] (in Croatian). Zagreb-Tomislavgrad: Hrvatski institut za povijest–Naša ognjišta–Zajednica Duvnjaka Tomislavgrad. ISBN 9536324253.
- Kovačević, Marko (2000). "Duvanjski govor i njegove posebnosti" [The speech of Duvno and its peculiarities]. In Krišto, Jure (ed.). Duvanjski zbornik [The collection of papers of Duvno] (in Croatian). Zagreb-Tomislavgrad: Hrvatski institut za povijest–Naša ognjišta–Zajednica Duvnjaka Tomislavgrad. ISBN 9536324253.
- Milić, Angelika (2000). "Popis nekropola duvanjskog područja" [The list of necropolis of the territory of Duvno]. In Krišto, Jure (ed.). Duvanjski zbornik [The collection of papers of Duvno] (in Croatian). Zagreb-Tomislavgrad: Hrvatski institut za povijest–Naša ognjišta–Zajednica Duvnjaka Tomislavgrad. ISBN 9536324253.
- Nacionalni sastav stanovništva [The national composition of the population] (PDF) (in Serbo-Croatian). Sarajevo: Državni zavod za statistiku Republike Bosne i Hercegovine. 1994.
- Nacionalni sastav stanovništva FNR Jugoslavije [The national composition of the population of the FNR Yugoslavia] (PDF) (in Serbo-Croatian). Vol. 1. Belgrade: Savezni zavod za statistiku. 1994.
- Nacionalni sastav stanovništva FNR Jugoslavije [The national composition of the population of the FNR Yugoslavia] (PDF) (in Serbo-Croatian). Vol. 2. Belgrade: Savezni zavod za statistiku. 1994.
- Nacionalni sastav stanovništva FNR Jugoslavije [The national composition of the population of the FNR Yugoslavia] (PDF) (in Serbo-Croatian). Vol. 3. Belgrade: Savezni zavod za statistiku. 1994.
- Šarić, Ivan (2000). "Arheološka topografija duvanjskog kraja" [The archeological topograhy of the region of Duvno]. In Krišto, Jure (ed.). Duvanjski zbornik [The collection of papers of Duvno] (in Croatian). Zagreb-Tomislavgrad: Hrvatski institut za povijest–Naša ognjišta–Zajednica Duvnjaka Tomislavgrad. ISBN 9536324253.
