= Grabovica, Tomislavgrad =

Grabovica
- Village
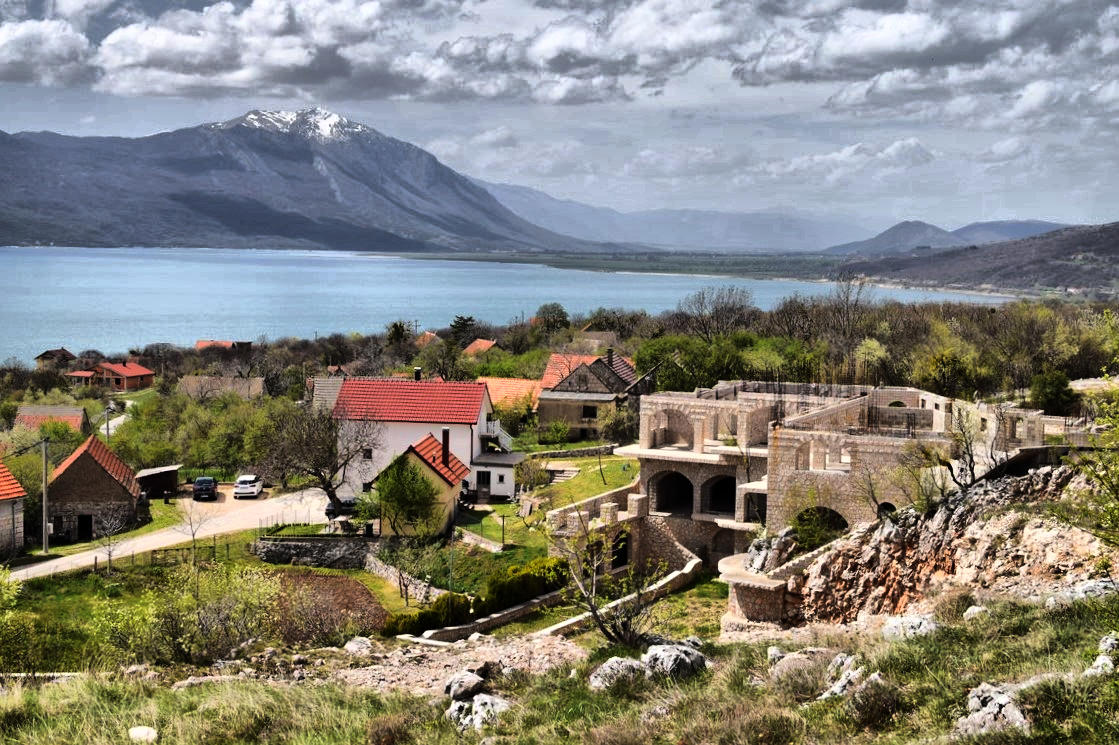
- A village of Grabovica with the adjacent Buško Lake
- Etymology: Croatian: grab ('hornbeam')
- Interactive map of Grabovica
- Location within Bosnia and Herzegovina
- Coordinates: 43°39′4.90″N 17°05′0.00″E
- Country: Bosnia and Herzegovina
- Entity: Federation of Bosnia and Herzegovina
- Canton: Canton 10
- Municipality: Tomislavgrad

Area
  - Total: 10.57 km^{2} (4.08 sq mi)

Population (2013)
  - Total: 543
  - Density: 51.4/km^{2} (133/sq mi)
- Time zone: UTC+1 (CET)
  - Summer (DST): UTC+2 (CEST)
- Postal code: 80240

Grabovica is a village in the Municipality of Tomislavgrad in Canton 10 of the Federation of Bosnia and Herzegovina, an entity of Bosnia and Herzegovina. According to the 2013 census, there were 543 inhabitants.

Ivan Ivančić, a Croatian and Yugoslav shot putter was born in Grabovica.

== Demographics ==
According to the 2013 census, its population was 543.

Ethnicity in 2013
Ethnicity	Number	Percentage
Croats	540	99.4%
Bosniaks	1	0.2%
other/undeclared	2	0.4%
Total	543	100%

== Bibliography ==
- Ethnicity/National Affiliation, Religion and Mother Tongue (PDF). Sarajevo: Agency for Statistics of Bosnia and Herzegovina. 2019.
