= Seonica, Konjic =

Seonica Сеоница
- Village
- Location within Bosnia and Herzegovina
- Coordinates: 43.7397°N 17.84208°E
- Country: Bosnia and Herzegovina
- Entity: Federation of Bosnia and Herzegovina
- Canton: Herzegovina-Neretva
- Municipality: Konjic

Area
  - Total: 0.54 sq mi (1.41 km^{2})

Population (2013)
  - Total: 95
  - Density: 170/sq mi (67/km^{2})
- Time zone: UTC+1 (CET)
  - Summer (DST): UTC+2 (CEST)

Seonica (Cyrillic: Сеоница) is a village in the municipality of Konjic, Bosnia and Herzegovina.

== Demographics ==
According to the 2013 census, its population was 95.

Ethnicity in 2013
Ethnicity	Number	Percentage
Bosniaks	74	77.9%
Croats	20	21.1%
other/undeclared	1	1.1%
Total	95	100%
