= Rašeljke =

- Village
- Etymology: Croatian: rašeljka ("prunus mahaleb" or "mahaleb cherry")
- Location within Bosnia and Herzegovina
- Coordinates: 43°49′21.42″N 17°13′11.12″E
- Country: Bosnia and Herzegovina
- Entity: Federation of Bosnia and Herzegovina
- Canton: Canton 10
- Municipality: Tomislavgrad

Area
  - Total: 17.15 km^{2} (6.62 sq mi)

Population (2013)
  - Total: 383
  - Density: 22.3/km^{2} (57.8/sq mi)
- Time zone: UTC+1 (CET)
  - Summer (DST): UTC+2 (CEST)
- Postal code: 80240

Rašeljke is a village in the Municipality of Tomislavgrad in Canton 10 of the Federation of Bosnia and Herzegovina, an entity of Bosnia and Herzegovina.

== Demographics ==
According to the 2013 census, its population was 383.

Ethnicity in 2013
Ethnicity	Number	Percentage
Croats	379	99.0%
Bosniaks	1	0.3%
other/undeclared	3	0.8%
Total	383	100%

== Bibliography ==
- Ethnicity/National Affiliation, Religion and Mother Tongue (PDF). Sarajevo: Agency for Statistics of Bosnia and Herzegovina. 2019.
