= Donji Brišnik =

- Village
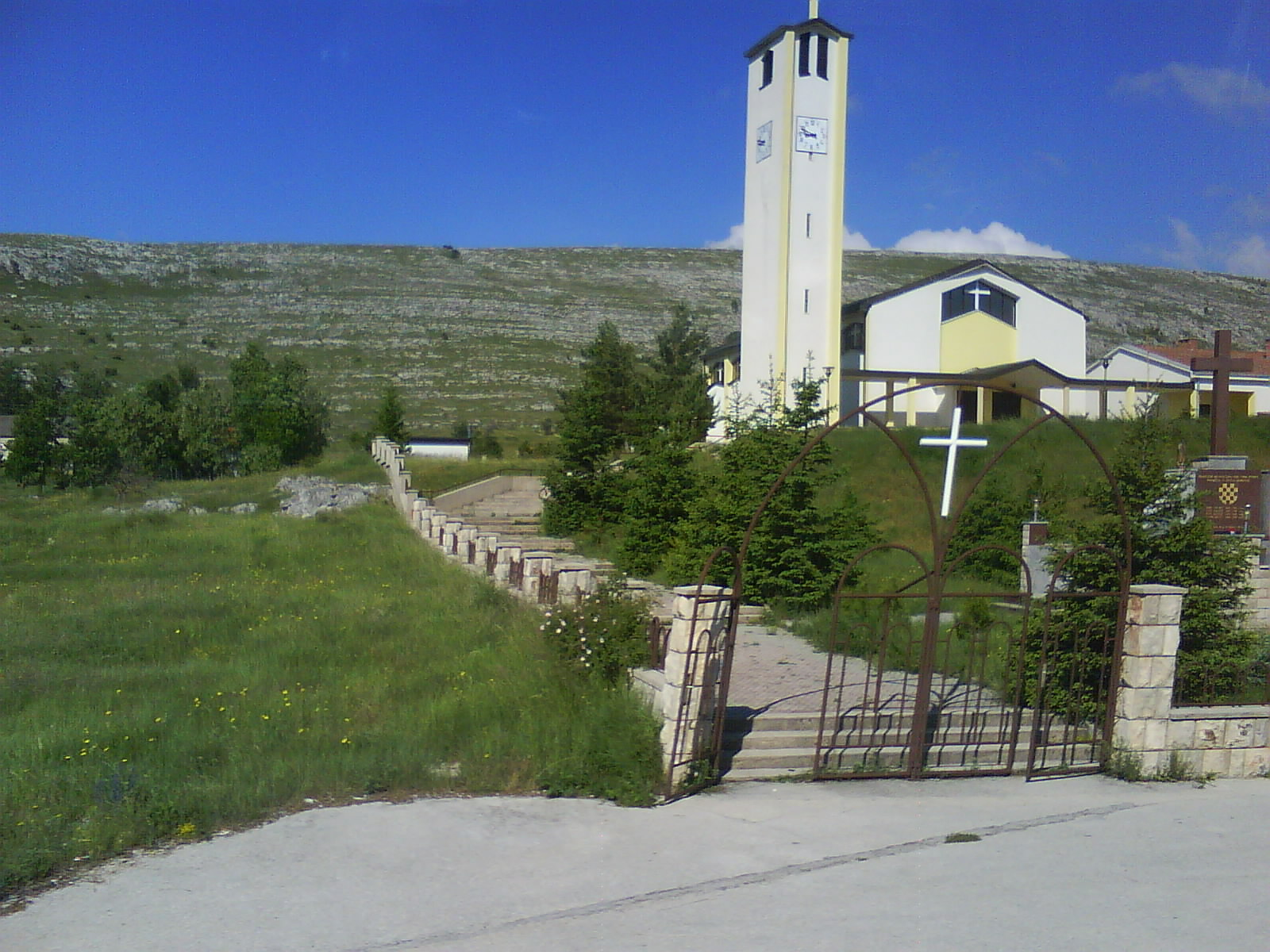
- A church on the outskirts of Bukovica

- Location within Bosnia and Herzegovina
- Coordinates: 43°38′N 17°14′E
- Country: Bosnia and Herzegovina
- Entity: Federation of Bosnia and Herzegovina
- Canton: Canton 10
- Municipality: Tomislavgrad

Area
  - Total: 7.78 km^{2} (3.00 sq mi)

Population (2013)
  - Total: 790
  - Density: 100/km^{2} (260/sq mi)
- Time zone: UTC+1 (CET)
  - Summer (DST): UTC+2 (CEST)

Donji Brišnik is a village in the Municipality of Tomislavgrad in Herceg-Bosnian county/canton Canton 10 of the Federation of Bosnia and Herzegovina, an entity of Bosnia and Herzegovina.

== Demographics ==
According to the 2013 census, its population was 790.

Ethnicity in 2013
Ethnicity	Number	Percentage
Croats	788	99.7%
other/undeclared	2	0.3%
Total	790	100%

== Bibliography ==
- Ethnicity/National Affiliation, Religion and Mother Tongue (PDF). Sarajevo: Agency for Statistics of Bosnia and Herzegovina. 2019.
