= Prisoje, Tomislavgrad =

Prisoje
- Village
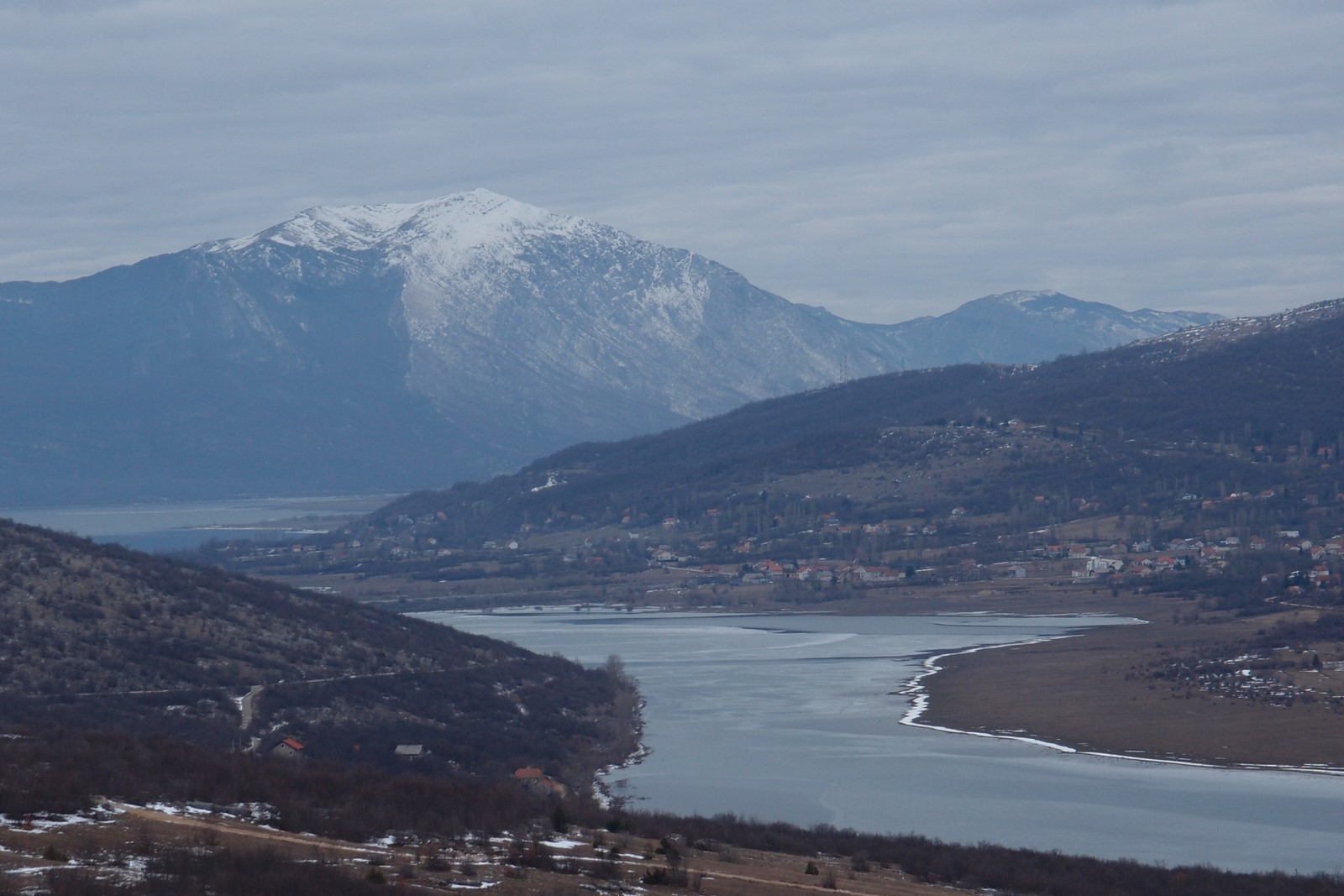
- A skyline of Prisoje in 2022

- Location within Bosnia and Herzegovina
- Coordinates: 43°41′16″N 17°04′53″E
- Country: Bosnia and Herzegovina
- Entity: Federation of Bosnia and Herzegovina
- Canton: Canton 10
- Municipality: Tomislavgrad

Area
  - Total: 20.69 km^{2} (7.99 sq mi)

Population (2013)
  - Total: 1,107
  - Density: 53.50/km^{2} (138.6/sq mi)
- Time zone: UTC+1 (CET)
  - Summer (DST): UTC+2 (CEST)
- Postal code: 80240

Prisoje is a village in the Municipality of Tomislavgrad in Canton 10 of the Federation of Bosnia and Herzegovina, an entity of Bosnia and Herzegovina.

== Demographics ==
According to the 2013 census, its population was 1,107.

Ethnicity in 2013
Ethnicity	Number	Percentage
Croats	1,106	99.9%
other/undeclared	1	0.1%
Total	1,107	100%

== Bibliography ==
- Ethnicity/National Affiliation, Religion and Mother Tongue (PDF). Sarajevo: Agency for Statistics of Bosnia and Herzegovina. 2019.
