= Stipanjići =

- Village
- Location within Bosnia and Herzegovina
- Coordinates: 43°43′N 17°10′E
- Country: Bosnia and Herzegovina
- Entity: Federation of Bosnia and Herzegovina
- Canton: Canton 10
- Municipality: Tomislavgrad

Area
  - Total: 27.30 km^{2} (10.54 sq mi)
- Elevation: 920 m (3,020 ft)

Population (2013)
  - Total: 1,167
  - Density: 42.75/km^{2} (110.7/sq mi)
- Time zone: UTC+1 (CET)
  - Summer (DST): UTC+2 (CEST)

Stipanjići is a village in the Municipality of Tomislavgrad in Canton 10 of the Federation of Bosnia and Herzegovina, an entity of Bosnia and Herzegovina.

== Location ==
Stipanjići is 7 kilometres away from Tomislavgrad

== Demographics ==
According to the 2013 census, its population was 1,167.

Ethnicity in 2013
Ethnicity	Number	Percentage
Croats	778	66.7%
Bosniaks	376	32.2%
Serbs	1	0.1%
other/undeclared	12	1.0%
Total	1,167	100%

== Bibliography ==
- Ethnicity/National Affiliation, Religion and Mother Tongue (PDF). Sarajevo: Agency for Statistics of Bosnia and Herzegovina. 2019.
