= Kamensko, Split-Dalmatia County =

Settlement in Split-Dalmatia County, Croatia

Kamensko
- Settlement
- Interactive map of Kamensko
- Location within Croatia
- Coordinates: 43°37′01″N 16°57′11″E
- Country: Croatia
- County: Split-Dalmatia
- City: Trilj

Area
  - Total: 13.1 km^{2} (5.1 sq mi)

Population (2021)
  - Total: 62
  - Density: 4.7/km^{2} (12/sq mi)
- Time zone: UTC+1 (CET)
  - Summer (DST): UTC+2 (CEST)
- Postal code: 21256 Cista Provo
- Area code: +385 (0)21

Kamensko is a settlement in the City of Trilj in Croatia. In 2021, its population was 62.

== Demographics ==
Kamensko: Population trends 1857–2021
v

population	282	306	380	439	551	599	609	597	634	652	641	597	595	541	266	107	62
	1857	1869	1880	1890	1900	1910	1921	1931	1948	1953	1961	1971	1981	1991	2001	2011	2021

Sources: Croatian Bureau of Statistics publications

== Landmarks ==
St. Peter the Apostle Church in Kamensko, measuring 17 meters long, 7 meters wide, and 6 meters high, was constructed from cut stone in 1939. A bell-gable is integrated into its facade, with the main doorway surmounted by a tympanum. Inside, the sanctuary features an altar containing a niche that houses a full-scale statue of St. Peter.
