= Kolo, Tomislavgrad =

Kolo
- Village
- Location within Bosnia and Herzegovina
- Coordinates: 43°42′16″N 17°13′00″E
- Country: Bosnia and Herzegovina
- Entity: Federation of Bosnia and Herzegovina
- Canton: Canton 10
- Municipality: Tomislavgrad

Area
  - Total: 9.25 km^{2} (3.57 sq mi)
- Elevation: 880 m (2,890 ft)

Population (2013)
  - Total: 998
  - Density: 108/km^{2} (279/sq mi)
- Time zone: UTC+1 (CET)
  - Summer (DST): UTC+2 (CEST)

Kolo is a village in the Municipality of Tomislavgrad in Canton 10 of the Federation of Bosnia and Herzegovina, an entity of Bosnia and Herzegovina.

== Demographics ==
According to the 2013 census, its population was 998.

Ethnicity in 2013
Ethnicity	Number	Percentage
Croats	996	99.8%
Bosniaks	1	0.1%
other/undeclared	1	0.1%
Total	998	100%

== Bibliography ==
- Ethnicity/National Affiliation, Religion and Mother Tongue (PDF). Sarajevo: Agency for Statistics of Bosnia and Herzegovina. 2019.
