= Roško Polje =

Village in Bosnia and Herzegovina

- Village
- Location within Bosnia and Herzegovina
- Coordinates: 43°35′N 17°10′E
- Country: Bosnia and Herzegovina
- Entity: Federation of Bosnia and Herzegovina
- Canton: Canton 10
- Municipality: Tomislavgrad

Area
  - Total: 20.65 km^{2} (7.97 sq mi)

Population (2013)
  - Total: 1,000
  - Density: 48/km^{2} (130/sq mi)
- Time zone: UTC+1 (CET)
  - Summer (DST): UTC+2 (CEST)

Roško Polje is a village in the Municipality of Tomislavgrad in Canton 10 of the Federation of Bosnia and Herzegovina, an entity of Bosnia and Herzegovina.

== Demographics ==
According to the 2013 census, its population was 1,000.

Ethnicity in 2013
Ethnicity	Number	Percentage
Croats	998	99.8%
other/undeclared	2	0.2%
Total	1,000	100%

== Bibliography ==
- Ethnicity/National Affiliation, Religion and Mother Tongue (PDF). Sarajevo: Agency for Statistics of Bosnia and Herzegovina. 2019.
