= Vojkovići, Tomislavgrad =

Vojkovići
- Village
- Location within Bosnia and Herzegovina
- Coordinates: 43°34′32″N 17°13′02″E
- Country: Bosnia and Herzegovina
- Entity: Federation of Bosnia and Herzegovina
- Canton: Canton 10
- Municipality: Tomislavgrad

Area
  - Total: 13.78 km^{2} (5.32 sq mi)

Population (2013)
  - Total: 288
  - Density: 20.9/km^{2} (54.1/sq mi)
- Time zone: UTC+1 (CET)
  - Summer (DST): UTC+2 (CEST)

Vojkovići is a village in the Municipality of Tomislavgrad in Canton 10 of the Federation of Bosnia and Herzegovina, an entity of Bosnia and Herzegovina.

== Demographics ==
According to the 2013 census, its population was 288, all Croats.

== Bibliography ==
- Ethnicity/National Affiliation, Religion and Mother Tongue (PDF). Sarajevo: Agency for Statistics of Bosnia and Herzegovina. 2019.
