= Kopčić family =

The Kopčić family was a noble Ottoman Bosnian family that held possessions in the region of Rama, Duvno and Uskoplje.

The oldest known member of the Kopčić family is Kasim Bey, who owned a ziamet, a form of land tenure, in the nahiyah of Osat, Borač and Vratar, all located in the kaza of Višegrad. The ziamet consisted of six villages. It produced c. 40,000 akçe as revenue. During the Battle of Mohács, when most of the Ottoman Bosnian landlords went for the battle, Kasim Bey was ordered to stay to defend the Bosnia Eyalet. He had two sons – Murat Bey and Džafer Bey.

Murat Bey was a sanjak-bey of Klis and resided in Livno. He owned a ziamet in the nahiyah of Neretva, consisting of several villages. Murat Bey built a maqtab in Prozor. He had three sons – Džafer Bey, Kasim Bey and Nuh Bey. All of them were beys and owned land in the Rama region. Murat Bey's brother Džafer is mentioned in several folk songs. Mehmed Bey, his only known child, was a landowner in the nahiyah of Neretva.

The Kopčić family traditionally was in good relations with the Catholic populace.
