= Boze =

Boze may refer to:

- Boże (disambiguation), two settlements in Poland
- Boze language, a language spoken in Nigeria

== People ==
- Boze (surname), a family name

Given name

- Boze Berger (1910–1992), American baseball player
- Boze Hadleigh (born 1954), American author
- Bože Radoš (born 1964), Croatian prelate
