= Holy League (1594) =

European military alliance

- The Holy League (purple; Orthodox members in darker shade) and theaters of war in 1595
- Founder: Pope Clement VIII
- Leaders: Rudolf II; Philip II; Severyn Nalyvaiko; Michael the Brave; Aaron the Tyrant; Sigismund Báthory; Jovan Kantul
- Ideology: Christianity

The Holy League established in 1594 by Pope Clement VIII was a military alliance of predominantly Christian European countries (Holy League) aimed against the Ottoman Empire during the Long War (1591–1606). The aim of this alliance was to drive the Ottoman Empire out of Europe.

The coalition was led by Rudolf II, Holy Roman Emperor. The Holy See took for granted that Poland would join the League, together with all most powerful neighbours of the Ottoman Empire, in spite of their mutual enmities. The league expected assistance from the Balkan's Christian population.

The establishing of this Holy League was only partially successful, while the Holy League managed to halt further Ottoman conquests in Europe.

== Preparations ==
Already in 1583 a group of Cossacks proposed to the Pope to initiate crusade against the Ottomans. Ten years later, Aleksandar Komulović convinced the Pope to support his ambitious plan which also involved Cossacks. His plan was to establish military alliance which would undertake three pronged attack on Ottoman Empire. The first attack would be organized by the army of Poland led by Zamojski, the second attack would be led by Francesco Sforza toward Constantinople through Albania, while the third army of combined forces of Moldavia, Wallachia and Transylvania led by Andrew Batory would attack the Ottomans with support of Cossacks and Russia.

The established of this Holy League was initiated by the papacy already in 1592–3.

With the outbreak of the Long War, Clement VIII sent missions to Emperor Rudolf II, Philip II of Spain, and other princes. Clement VIII subsidized the Habsburgs with 600,000 scudi in 1594–95. About three million florins of subsidies were secured by Clement VIII over next ten years, as well as Italian auxiliary troops and France's neutrality toward Holy Roman Empire. The League was projected in grandiose scale, to also include Holy See, Spain and Venice.

Clement VIII appealed to Spain and Venice in vain. He also hoped that the Swedish king Sigismund II would fight the Ottomans in his role as king of Poland. In 1597, Clement VIII sent a force under his nephew to Hungary. He did it again in 1598.

== Mission of Aleksandar Komulović ==
=== Background ===
At the end of January 1593 Petar Čedolini, a bishop from Hvar, sent a letter to the Pope inviting him to send envoys to Russia to forge a united Christian coalition against the Ottomans. In the same year a similar proposal was sent to the Pope by Komulović himself. An anonymous report from 1593, attributed to Komulović by many scholars, lists predominantly Slavic regions that could be mobilized to fight the Ottomans: Herzegovina, Slavonia, Croatia, Dalmatia, Serbia, Moesia, Bosnia, Rascia, Požega and Temeşvar. Dalmatian friar Francesco Antonio Bertucci and Ivan (Janko) Alberti went to Rome to propose to Pope to start anti-Ottoman campaign by Uskok attack and capture of Klis and Herceg Novi. Their proposal was accepted

At the beginning of 1594, Clement VIII sent clergyman Aleksandar Komulović of Nona to central and eastern Europe with the purpose to persuade the rulers of Transylvania, Moldavia, Wallachia, and Russia to join an alliance against the Ottomans. Komulović also tried to enlist the Zaporizhian Cossacks, who were important as frequent raiders of Ottoman territory. Komulović was to appeal to the Serbs about liberation from the Ottomans.

=== Members of mission ===
The mission was led by Aleksandar Komulović who participated in the mission in its entire period between 1593 and 1597. Komulović and Giovanni Battista from Cres maintained extensive contacts with the Patriarchate of Peć. Another member of Komulović's mission was Thommaso Raggio (1531–1599), who returned to Italy in 1595 while Komulović stayed in the Balkans until 1597 and submitted a detailed report to the Pope upon his return. He travelled to Moscow and twice visited the court of the Russian emperor, in 1595 and in 1597, but failed to convince the Muscovites to accept his proposals.

=== Countries, territories and people projected as members ===
This coalition was to include all Christian Slavs, including Orthodox Russia. Komulović traveled via Venice, Trent, Innsbruck and Vienna to Alba Iulia. The purpose of this trip was to convince the Tsar of Russia, King of Poland (including the Zaporozhian Cossacks), the Prince of Transylvania and Voivodes of Moldavia and Wallachia to join a western anti-Ottoman coalition. His aim was also to inspire Serbs to rise up against the Ottomans. According to some sources he continued his journey to Ancona, Hvar, Dubrovnik, Venetian Albania, Kosovo, Macedonia, Bulgaria, and finally Moldavia.

==== Serbs ====
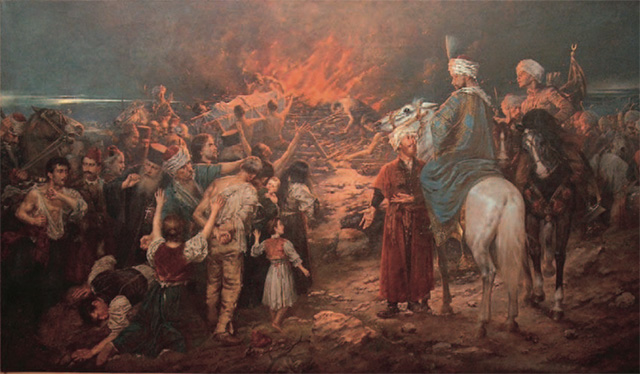
The burning of Saint Sava's relics by the Ottomans. Painting by Stevan Aleksić (1912)

In Pope Clement VIII's instructions to Komulović, the Serbs were explicitly praised as brave, while the neighbouring Bulgarians were said to be unwilling to fight. It is possible that these instructions were composed by Komulović himself. Still, the mission inspired a series of uprisings in Serb-populated territories, such as the Uprising in Banat and Uprising in Peć in 1594. Clement VIII chose not to support the Serb Uprising of 1596–97. Without appropriate support from other Christian countries all this uprisings were suppressed with heavy casualties for Serb civilian population. In an act of retaliation, Grand Vizier Koca Sinan Pasha ordered burning of the relics of Saint Sava, the patron saint of Serbia and Serbs. The Archbishop of Peć and Serbian Patriarch and the spiritual leader of the Serbian Orthodox Church Jovan Kantul who supported the uprising of Serbs was captured by the Ottomans and strangled in Istanbul.

==== Russia ====
Russia refused to participate using bad relation with Poland as justification.

==== Cossacks ====
After the outbreak of the Long War in 1593, Rudolph II sent his envoy Count Eric Lasota to Zaporozhia.

In 1594 and 1595 Cossacks plundered Moldavia and invaded Transylvania.

==== Albanians ====
In 1593 a strange letter in Italian language was sent to Pope in which "elders from Albania" requested the Emperor of the Holy Roman Empire and King of Poland to "move" against the Ottomans. Komulović was instructed to first travel to Venice to establish contacts with Albanians. In Venice he stayed in the house of notable Thomasso Pelessa from Albania. Komulović allegedly met representatives of "Albanians" in Venice. The Popes instructions and several letters Komulović had sewed in a cushion. When he left Venice he made tremendous mistake and forgot the cushion leaving behind three letters written in lingua Serviana by the "people of Albania". The Venetian authorities got in possession of those letters and concluded they were forged by Komulović, which is also believed by modern Australian historian Zdenko Zlatar.

In July 1594, an assembly was summoned in a monastery in Mat, by Albanian tribal chieftains, joined by some Venetian subjects, of whom Mark Gjin was elected their leader. In 1595 he visited Rome to receive the Pope's support.

The Himara Revolt broke out in Albania in 1596, but it was easily suppressed after the Venetians convinced some of the chieftains not to join the rebellion.

==== Republic of Ragusa ====
According to some rumours, the Republic of Ragusa was ready to expel Komulović because the Ottomans offered them some benefits if they did. Ragusans were worried because of the anti-Ottoman actions of Ragusan Jesuits.

==== Holy Roman Empire ====
In 1597 Komulović began his return journey and stopped in Prague to propose to Emperor Rudolf II to re-capture Klis, which had a year earlier been briefly captured by the Uskoks.

=== Result of Komulović's mission ===
Komulović did not succeed in forming the anti-Ottoman coalition, as none of the countries accepted the Pope's invitation.

== Treaty of alliance ==
At the beginning of the Long War in 1593 Rudolph and Bathory prepared the strategy to include participation of Moldavia and Wallachia in the Holy League. In the summer of 1594 their emissaries, led by Giovanni de Marini Poli from Ragusa, easily convinced Aron Movila and Moldavian boyars to join the league.

In November 1594 the Triple Alliance of the Three Voivods was established by creation of an alliance between the Prince Sigismund Báthory of Transylvania, Voivod Aron Tiranul of Moldavia, and Voivod Michael the Brave of Wallachia.

Facilitated by the Pope, a treaty of alliance was signed in Prague by Emperor Rudolf II and Sigismund Báthory of Transylvania in 1595. Aron Vodă of Moldavia and Michael the Brave of Wallachia joined the alliance later that year. Clement VIII himself lent the Emperor valuable assistance in men and money.

== See also ==
- Holy League (1571)
