= List of Croatian dictionaries =

This is a list of Croatian dictionaries published before the 20th century.

== 16th, 17th and 18th century ==
- 1595 – Faust Vrančić, Dictionarium quinque nobilissimarum Europae linguarum Latinae, Italicae, Germanicae, Dalmaticae et Ungaricae (the first Croatian printed dictionary in the form of a separate work).
- 1599 – Bartol Kašić, Razlika skladanja slovinska (Various Slavic compositions) (a Croatian–Italian manuscript dictionary).
- 1649 – Jakov Mikalja, Blago jezika slovinskoga (Treasury of the Slavic language) (containing selected words in an idiom in which Čakavian characteristics are grafted upon the main corpus of Ijekavian Štokavian and Ikavian texts).
- 1670 – Juraj Habdelić, Dictionar ili rechi slovenske z vexega ukup ebrane (Dictionary of Slavic words brought together, Kajkavian).
- 1700 (cca.) – Pavao Ritter Vitezović, Lexicon Latino-Illyricum (a manuscript Latin-Illyrian dictionary in which the author carried out in practice his views on the language and spelling).
- 1728 – Ardelio della Bella, Dizionario Italiano–Latino–Illirico (mainly based on Ragusan literary sources, but also includes Čakavian sources; supplemented by a short grammar of Croatian).
- Adam Patačić, Dictionarium latino-illyricum et germanicum (manuscript dictionary).
- 1740 – Ivan Belostenec, Gazophylacium seu latino-illyricorum onomatum aerarium.(a Kajkavian-based monumental dictionary of 50,000 entries)
- 1742 – Andrija Jambrešić-Franjo Sušnik, Lexicon latinum interpretatione illyrica, germanica et hungarica locu pIes (the names "Croatian" and "Illyrian" are used synonymously).
- 1778 – Marijan Lanosović, Slavonisches Worterbuch (a list of German words and their Croatian equivalents), added to the grammar entitled Neue Einleitung zur slavonischen Sprache, Osijek. (M. Lanosović is the author of several Croatian dictionaries which have remained in manuscript).

== 19th century ==
- 1801 – Joakim Stulić, Lexicon latino-italico-illyricum, Budim.
- 1802–03 – Josip Voltiggi, Ričoslovnik iliričkoga, italijanskoga i nimačkoga jezika (A dictionary of the Illyrian, Italian and German languages) (based on Ikavian; Jekavian forms are cited along with Ikavian; Ekavian forms refer to Ikavian).
- 1806 – Joakim Stulić, Rječosložje ilirsko-talijansko-latinsko (Illyrian—Italian—Latin dictionary), Dubrovnik.
- 1810 – Joakim Stulić, Vocabolario italiano-illirico-latino, Dubrovnik (the bulk of the dictionary was excerpted from published works of Ragusan writers, along with Dalmatian, Herzegovinian, Bosnian, Slavonian and Istrian sources. More than 80,000 words on 4,600 pages, excerpted from 120 authors).
- 1842 – Ivan Mažuranić and Josip Užarević, Njemačko—ilirski slovar (A German–Illyrian dictionary. First "truly modern" Croatian dictionary).
- 1874–75 – Bogoslav Šulek, Hrvatsko-njemačko-talijanski rječnik znanstvenog nazivlja (Croatian–German–Italian dictionary of scientific terminology. The cornerstone of modern civilisation terminology).
- 1880–1976 – Rječnik hrvatskoga ili srpskoga jezika (Dictionary of Croatian or Serbian), JAZU, Zagreb. The neogrammarian based magnum opus. More than 250,000 words.

== See also ==
- List of longest Croatian words
