= Marin Temperica =

16th-century Ragusan merchant, Jesuit and linguist

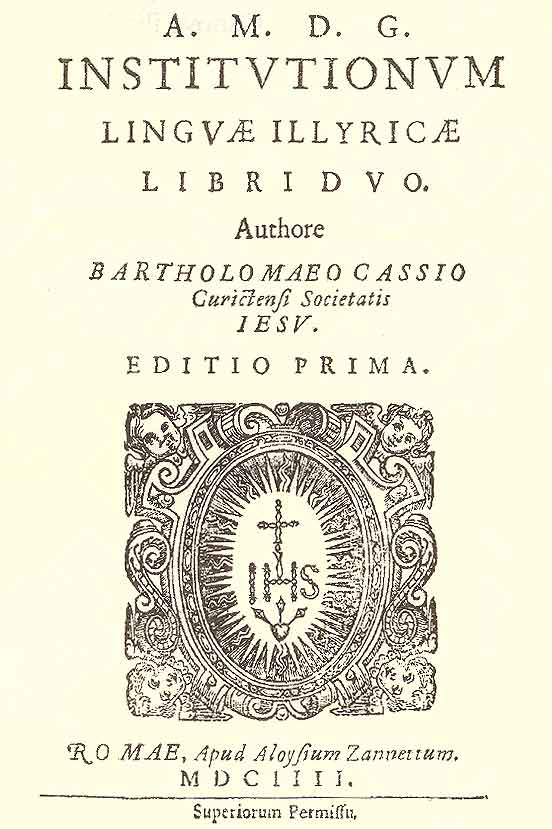
- The first Slavic language grammar published by Bartol Kašić in Rome in 1604, based on the request of Marin Temperica
- Born: December 1534; Dubrovnik, Republic of Ragusa
- Died: 1591 or 1598
- Other names: Marin Temparica, Marino Temparizza, Marin Temperičić
- Occupations: merchant, jesuit and linguist

Marin Temperica or Marin Temparica (Latin: Marinus Temparizza; December 1534 – 1591–98) was a 16th-century merchant, Jesuit and linguist from the Republic of Ragusa (modern-day Croatia). In 1551, after receiving basic education in Dubrovnik, he moved to Ottoman part of Balkans and spent 24 years working as a merchant. Temperica was one of the first chaplains of the Jesuit household in Istanbul. He returned to Dubrovnik in 1575 and continued his activities in Jesuit religious congregation of the Catholic Church.

Temperica understood the importance of the Slavic literary language understandable all over the Balkans for easier conversion of the schismatic population of Ottoman Empire. In 1582 he wrote a report to Jesuit general Claudio Acquaviva in which he insisted on publishing the Illyrian language dictionaries and grammars. He requested establishment of a seminary in Dubrovnik in which the Catholic religion would be taught in the Shtokavian dialect. His observations and requests were the basis for the first Slavic language grammar published by Bartol Kašić in Rome in 1604 and for the modern-day Croatian language standard.

== Early life ==
Temperica was born in December 1534 in Dubrovnik, Republic of Ragusa. In his youth he received some humanist education. In 1551 he moved to Ottoman part of Balkans and spent next 24 years working as merchant and earning substantial wealth. Temperica was one of the first chaplains of the Jesuit household in Istanbul. On 15 December 1567 Marin transcribed Hortulus animae from Latin to Cyrillic script.

In 1575 Temperica returned to Dubrovnik, where he met two notable jesuits, Emericus de Bona and Julius Mancinellus.

== Report to Acquaviva ==
In 1582 Temperica wrote a report to general Claudio Acquaviva. In his 1582 report Temperica expressed similar views as in 1593 report of another Jesuit, Aleksandar Komulović.

The Catholic Reformists believed that it was necessary to determine what would be the most understandable language version on the territory populated by South Slavs. Temperica emphasized the importance of the Slavic literary language understandable all over the Balkans. In the report, he uses the Latin term lingua sclavona (lit. "Slavonian language") or scalavona (lit. Slavic language) for the vernacular of Bosnia, Serbia and Herzegovina, while naming Church Slavonic as the literary language. Temperica insisted on Shtokavian as most widespread on the Balkans. He reported that the same language was spoken on the territory between Dubrovnik and Bulgaria, in Bosnia, Serbia and Herzegovina, being most appropriate basis for common South Slavic literary language.

== Serbian language and alphabet ==
Temperica believed that Serbian language spoken in Bosnia is the purest and most beautiful version of the Serbian language. With his advice and activities Temperica helped Angelo Rocca to publish his 1591 Bibliotheca apostolica, in which he also published the Serbian alphabet. Temperica wrote for Rocca the Catholic Lord's Prayer using the Cyrillic script, which he regularly refer to as "Alphabetum Servianum" and "Litterae Serbianae".

== Legacy ==
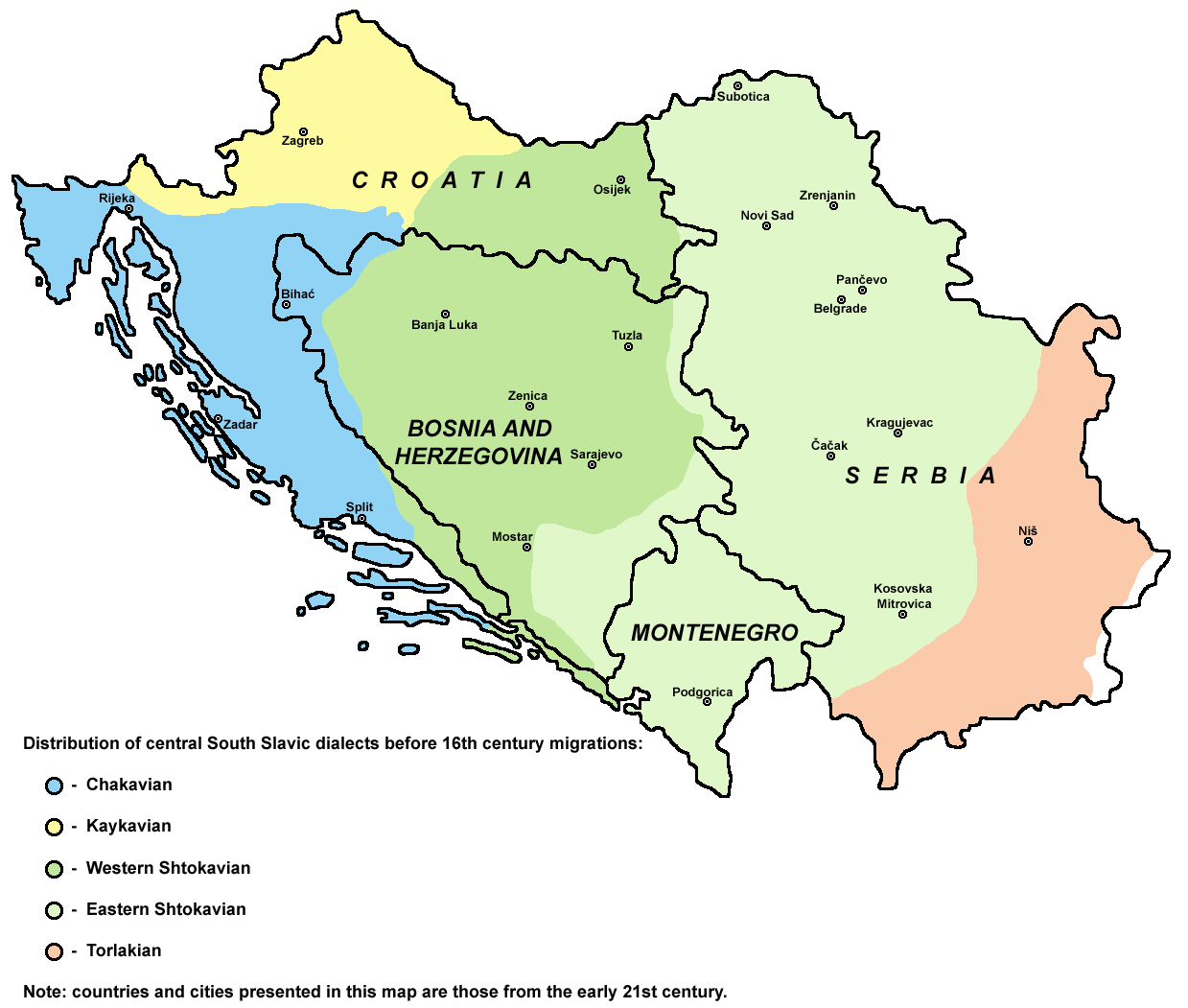
16th century distribution of Chakavian, Kajkavian and Shtokavian

The idea about Illyrian language as tool for religious unification of South Slavs inspired Pope Clement VIII to insist that Claudio Acquaviva should research this language. The result of Temperica's report to Acquaviva also includes the first Slavic language grammar published in 1604 in Rome in Latin by Bartol Kašić. Although he was born as Chakavian speaker, Kašić opted for Shtokavian of Bosnia as the best choice because it was most widely spread. Jakov Mikalja supported Kašić's position that dialect of Bosnia was the best variant of Illyrian (common South Slavic) language. Mikalja adopted an official position toward this language held by Jesuits and Pope under the influence of Teperica, comparing the beauty of Bosnian dialect with the beauty of Tuscan dialect.

Natko Nodilo explains that 1582 report of Temperica, in which he underlines the need for publishing of the Illyrian language dictionaries and grammars, is the earliest trace of Jesuit interest in Dubrovnik. Temperica proposed the establishment of the seminary on the territory of the Dubrovnik Diocese, in which the Shtokavian dialect would be used. Temperica's ideas and initiatives were the basis of the modern Croatian language standard.

== Sources ==
- V. A. Fine, John Jr. (2010). When Ethnicity Did Not Matter in the Balkans: A Study of Identity in Pre-Nationalist Croatia, Dalmatia, and Slavonia in the Medieval and Early-Modern Periods. University of Michigan Press. ISBN 978-0-472-02560-2.
