= Caritas Croatia =

Croatian social welfare and relief organisation

- Hrvatski Caritas
- Established: 9 June 1992; 34 years ago
- Founder: Episcopal Conference of Yugoslavia
- Type: Nonprofit
- Location: Zagreb, Croatia
- Region served: Croatia
- Fields: social services, humanitarian relief
- Official language: Croatian
- President: Bishop Bože Radoš
- Director: Fr. Tomislav Glavnik
- Affiliations: Caritas Europa, Caritas Internationalis
- Website: www.caritas.hr

Caritas Croatia (Croatian: Hrvatski Caritas), sometimes also translated as Croatian Caritas, is a Catholic not-for-profit social welfare and humanitarian relief organisation in Croatia. It is a service of the Episcopal Conference of Croatia.

Caritas Croatia is a member of both Caritas Europa and Caritas Internationalis.

== History ==
=== First Caritas in the 1930s ===
The current Caritas Croatia was established in 1992; however, the first local Caritas in the country was set up during the interwar period. In 1931, the Archbishop of Zagreb, Antun Bauer, encouraged clergy to establish charitable organisations and on 20 October 1933, the first diocesan Caritas in Croatia was founded in the Zagreb Archdiocese. Its aim was to unite all existing charitable initiatives and efforts under one umbrella organisation to coordinate and organise the diocese's charitable work, following the model of Caritas Germany. Two months later, Alojzije Stepinac was elected President of the organisation. By the following year, all except one parish in Zagreb had established their own Caritas committees. In January 1934, the magazine Karitas began publication.

Alojzije Stepinac became Bishop of Zagreb following the death of Archbishop Bauer in 1937. On 31 December 1938, he founded another organisation, Action for Aid to Refugees (Croatian: Akciju za pripomoć izbjeglicama), specifically to help refugees with accommodation, food, medicine, and documentation.

During the Second World War, Caritas Zagreb rescued thousands of children, safeguarded numerous refugees and exiles, and amassed and distributed thousands of tons of food. The organisation assisted Orthodox bishops and priests, provided aid and protection to persecuted and imprisoned Jews, protested against anti-Jewish laws, and advocated for and mediated the rescue of Jewish children, placing them under the care of Caritas. Following the war and the victory of the communist Yugoslav Partisans, Caritas was banned on 2 March 1946, with its property confiscated and transferred to the Red Cross. The director of Caritas in the Archdiocese of Zagreb Archdiocese, Dr. Vilim Nuk, was arrested and sentenced to six years in prison with forced labour.

=== Activities during communism ===
Despite the ban on organised charity work, individuals continued with charity work. Starting 1962, the Catholic weekly Glas Koncila began to be published. It contained a column titled "Who is my neighbour?" in which persons could request help. The help that arrived at the address of Glas Koncil was sent to poor families in Zagreb, but also in other places. This initiative was successful, and the Archdiocese of Zagreb wished to establish Caritas again. In 1967, Cardinal Franjo Šeper employed Jelena Brajša, with the aim of further promoting charitable activities. Due to the political restrictions, it was impossible to establish an independent Caritas. Therefore, Archbishop Franjo Šeper established the "Office for Liaison of the Bishops' Conference of Yugoslavia with Caritas Internationalis", upon suggestion of Caritas Internationalis representatives who met in Zagreb in 1968.

8 July 1969 was a turning point, when Jelena Brajša found a box with a living child in front of the office entrance. That event directed the future of Caritas of the Zagreb Archdiocese. Only during the first year after the acceptance of the first child, Caritas took care of sixty-five abandoned and rejected children, which is why the organisation became recognisable in the country and abroad. To date, Caritas has taken care of more than 5,000 children. At the beginning of the 1970s, Caritas organised help for abandoned children, mothers and pregnant women, poor families and people with disabilities. The activity took place in difficult conditions, but it increased and expanded from year to year, supported by the growing support of individuals and groups from within the country and abroad.

=== Establishment of Caritas Croatia ===
In December 1989, the Episcopal Conference of Yugoslavia (BKJ) created the Central Committee of Caritas BKJ to oversee all diocesan Caritas organisations being formed in Yugoslavia at that time. This committee was dissolved on 1 January 1993 and succeeded by Caritas Croatia, whose statutes were ratified during a meeting of the Croatian bishops on 9 June 1992.

During the Croatian War of Independence (1991–1995), the Caritas was an important humanitarian relief actor, providing food, medecine and materials assistance to communities in need. The organisation also established homes for children without adequate parental care, for persons with disabilities, and for the elderly. In the years after the war, Caritas organised the reception and care of refugees and internally displaced persons through numerous camps and later exile settlements, and provided help in rebuilding houses. The so-called "Remote Godparents" programme (Croatian: Kumstva na daljinu) allowed for the care of more than 13,000 children who lost their parents in the war.

=== Post-war work ===
After the war ended in the mid-1990s, Caritas Croatia focused on providing social protection and assistance to returnees, rebuilding destroyed homes, and offering loans to small entrepreneurs in war-affected areas. Their goal was to help people secure a livelihood for themselves and their families, enabling them to continue living in their communities.

In the 2000s, Caritas Croatia intensified its efforts to activate a widespread network of local parish Caritas organisations and systematically promote volunteering, emphasizing education and training for preventive action against growing social issues. This included developing a network of diocesan family counselling centres that addressed current social problems and focused on marriage and family issues. Additionally, they launched cooperative projects with numerous Church institutions and professional civil organisations for advocacy purposes.

At the same time, Caritas Croatia continued its role as a relief organisation, providing support to populations affected by large-scale disasters such as the 2014 floods and the 2020 Petrinja earthquake. Additionally, the organisation has been fundraising for partner organisations in other countries responding to disasters abroad, including the 2023 Morocco earthquake and the 2023 Turkey-Syria earthquakes.

In 2023, Hrvatska pošta issued a stamp to commemorate the 90th anniversary of the creation of Caritas Zagreb, and in January 2024, Croatian President Zoran Milanović presented the Charter of the Republic to Caritas Croatia on the 30th anniversary of its operations for its "exceptional humanitarian contributions in collecting and providing aid to the needy, as well as coordinating numerous programmes and projects of national importance".

== Structure ==
The structure of Caritas is the same as the structure of the Catholic Church in Croatia. Caritas Croatia consists of the national office as well as of 17 regional, autonomous Caritas organisations in Croatia. They work in 16 dioceses and archdioceses and in the military ordinariate. The diocesan Caritas organisations support people affected by poverty in Croatia and contribute therewith to social integration.

The 17 local organisations are:

- Caritas of the Archdiocese of Đakovo-Osijek
- Caritas of the Diocese of Hvar
- Caritas of the Eparchy of Križevci
- Caritas of the Diocese of Poreč and Pula
- Caritas of the Diocese of Požega
- Caritas of the Archdiocese of Rijeka
- Caritas of the Diocese of Sisak
- Caritas of the Archdiocese of Split-Makarska
- Caritas of the Diocese of Sibenik
- Caritas of the Diocese of Varaždin
- Caritas of the Military Ordinariate of Croatia
- Caritas of the Archdiocese of Zadar
- Caritas of the Archdiocese of Zagreb
- Caritas of the Diocese of Dubrovnik
- Caritas of the Diocese of Krk
- Caritas of the Diocese of Bjelovar-Križevaci

The 17 diocesan organisations in turn coordinate the work of hundreds of Caritas structures at parish level, firmly rooted in the local communities and ensuring a capillary presence all over the country.
