= Flag of Dubrovnik =

Croatian municipal flag

Republic of Ragusa
- Use: National flag
- Proportion: 2:3
- Adopted: Republic of Ragusa
- Use: State and War flag and Naval Ensign
- Proportion: 2:3
- Use: Civil ensign
- Proportion: 2:3
- Use: Secondary ensign
- Proportion: 2:3

The Flag of Dubrovnik is the symbol of the city of Dubrovnik, originating as the flag of the historical Republic of Ragusa.

The flag consists of a white field and gold border, charged with the icon and initials of Saint Blaise (Latin: Sanctus Blasius, Ragusan: Sveti Vlaho), a miracle-worker and national symbol of Ragusa considered the patron saint of both the Republic and modern Dubrovnik, with a feast day on 3 February.

Examples of Ragusan flags
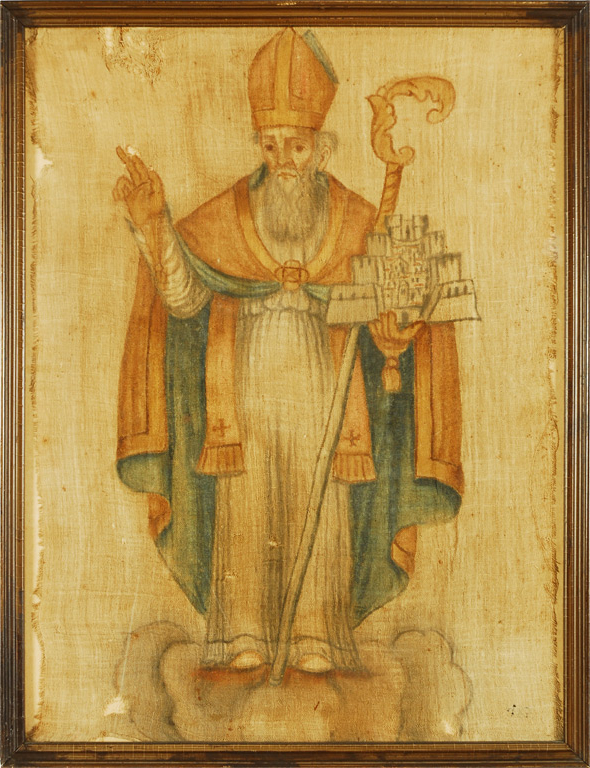
Middle portion from an original Ragusan flag over 200 years old

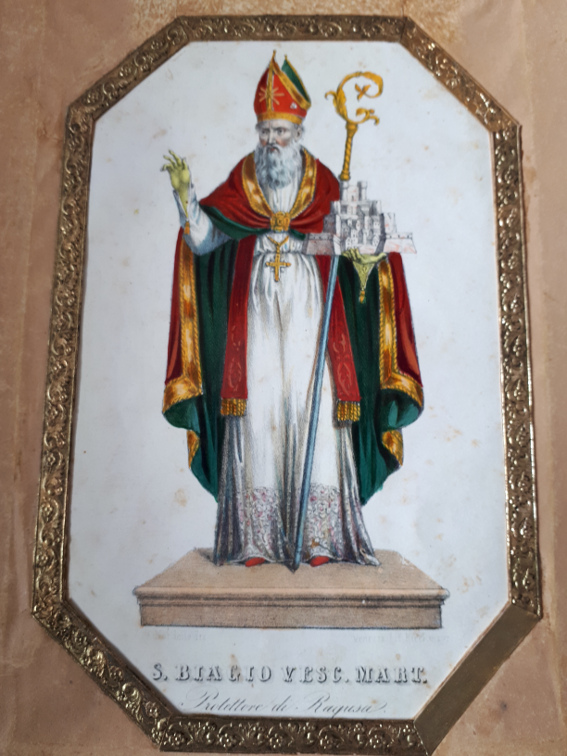
Depiction of Saint Blaise as used in historical flags

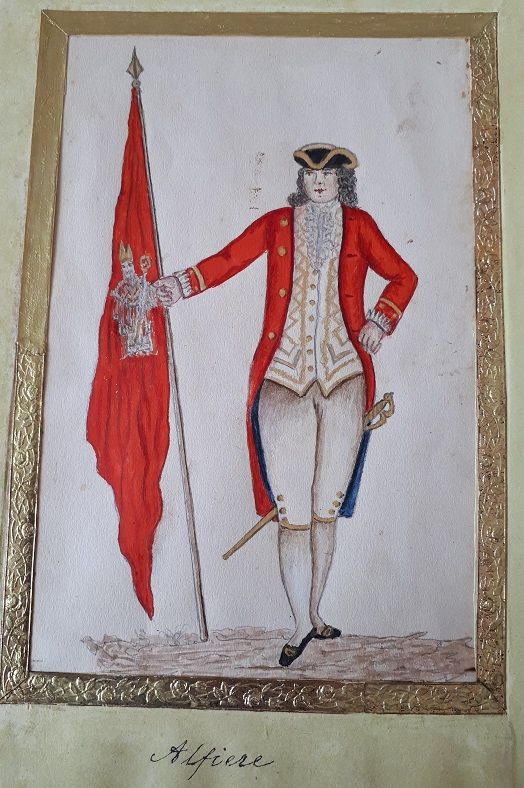
Ragusan junior military officer with State flag

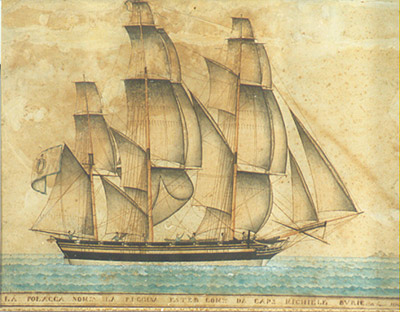
Ragusan ship "La Piccina Ester" with Civil ensign

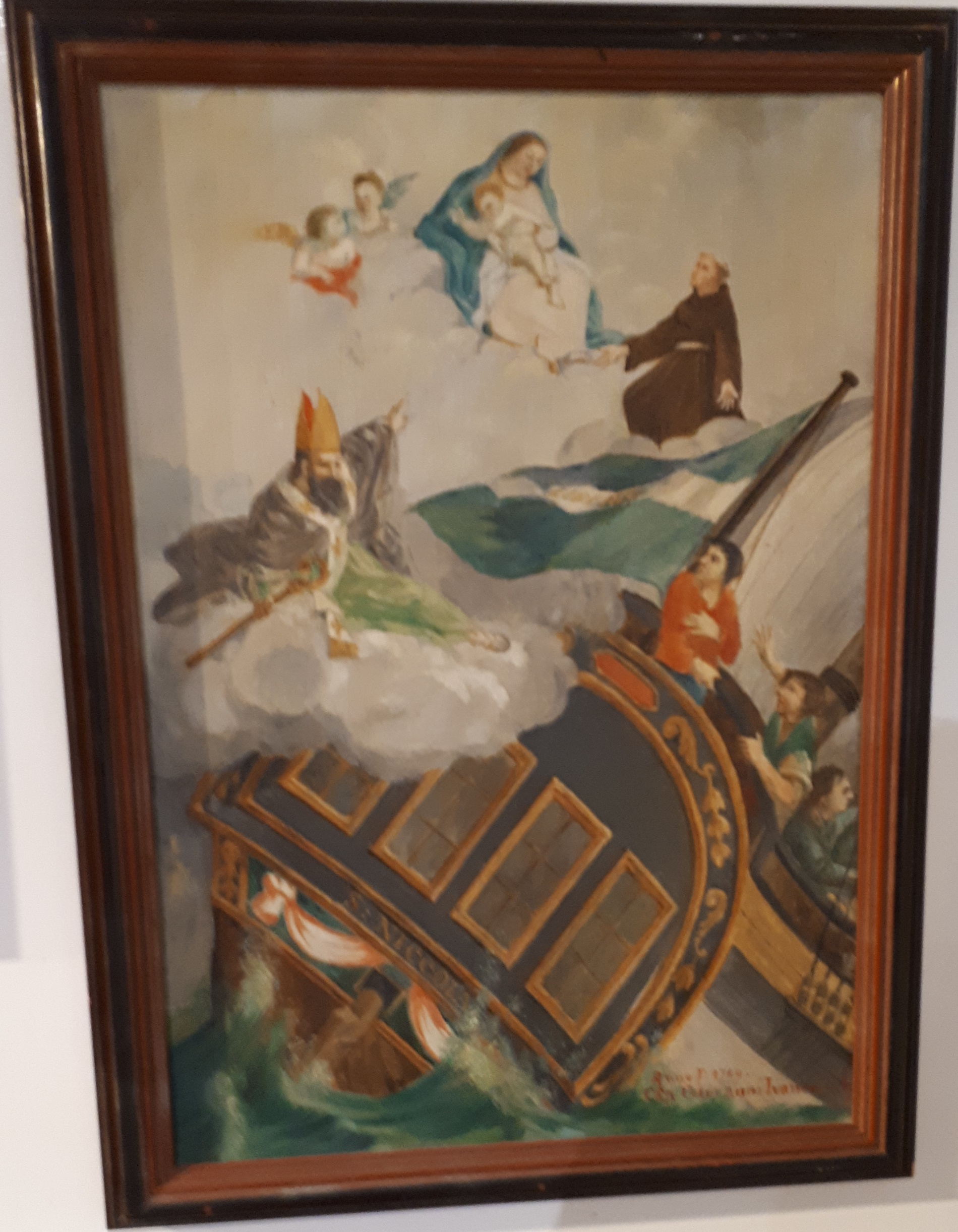
Ragusan ship with Secondary ensign

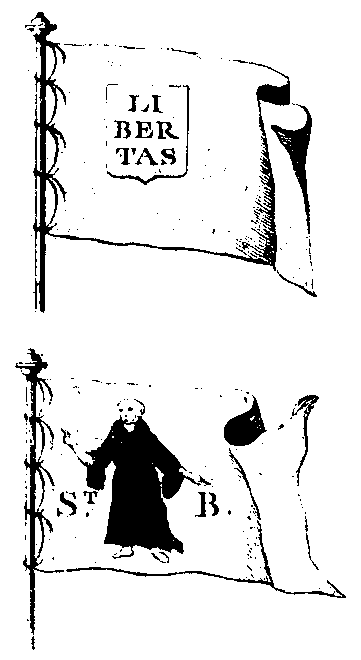
Flags of the Republic of Ragusa in the 18th century, according to the French Encyclopédie

Modernized Libertas pennant

== See also ==
- Coat of arms of Dubrovnik
- Dubrovnik
- Republic of Ragusa
