= Juraj Križanić =

Croatian missionary and early pan-Slavist (d. 1683)

- Born: c. 1618
- Died: 12 September 1683; Vienna
- Burial place: Obrh, near Ribnik, Croatia
- Other names: Georgius Crisanius, Yuriy Krizhanich
- Education: University of Bologna
- Occupation: missionary
- Known for: pan-Slavism

Ecclesiastical career
- Religion: Roman Catholicism

Juraj Križanić (c. 1618 – 12 September 1683), also known as Jurij Križanič, Yuriy Krizhanich, Iurii Krizhanich, and Yury Krizanitch (Russian: Юрий Крижанич; Latin: Georgius Crisanius, Czech: Jiří Križanić, French: Georges Krijanich), was a Croatian Catholic missionary and polymath who is often regarded as the earliest recorded pan-Slavist. His ideal, often misunderstood - even today - was to bring about a union of the churches, which Rome and Constantinople had tried to do without success for centuries. He believed that this might come about through closer relations between Slavic Catholicism and the Russian Orthodox Church, and supported the idea that all Slavs had a common language and ethnic origin.

However, he was not a pan-Slavist if this meant seeking the political unity of all Slavic peoples under Russian leadership. He considered that the only possible role for the tsar to 'correct' or unify the orthography and script used in Slavic-language books and awaken Slavic consciousness was through works conducive to education and logic. In extremis the South Slavs might join with the Russian tsar as a sovereign of the same language and people if the Catholic rulers supported his leadership in a war against the Ottomans.

After lengthy travels and fifteen years of exile in Siberia, Križanić died, misunderstood and disappointed, in battle during the Ottoman siege of Vienna in 1683. Although he had no direct followers, Križanić's work influenced many later South Slavic thinkers who championed both reliance on Russia and South Slavic cultural and political unification.

== Biography ==
=== Early life ===
Križanić was born in Obrh, near Ribnik (in present-day Croatia, then part of the Kingdom of Croatia (Habsburg)) in 1618, a period of political turmoil and Ottoman wars in Europe. His parents were Croatian noblemen Gašpar Križanić (died cca. 1633) and Suzana Oršić, and had a younger sister Barbara (married to Juraj Sandrić). His paternal family originated from the Croatian noble tribe of Nebljusi who had estates in old county of Nebljuh between Bihać and Korenica, from where his grandfather Juraj emigrated to the estate of the Zrinski family. Križanić signed himself as Croatus (1641) and Croata (1658), while in Russia others regarded him as Serbian because in Russia that ethnonym was a common umbrella name for Danubian Slavs, and died as "pater frater Augustinus Dalmata".

=== Education, and early missionary work ===
It is considered that he attended a Jesuit gymnasium in Ljubljana from 1629 to 1635. His father died when he was 17 years old, at approximately the same time he graduated from the gymnasium. Since 1635 he studied at the University of Graz where he achieved an academic degree of Master of Philosophy, then began attending the University of Bologna in 1638 to study theology and graduated in 1640. Shortly after graduating Križanić began attending the Greek College of St. Athanasius, a center in Rome for the training of Catholic missionaries who would work with Orthodox Christians; he graduated with a doctorate from this College in 1642. While Križanić had a strong desire to travel to Moscow with the ambitious goal of uniting the Roman Catholic and Russian Orthodox churches, he was assigned missionary duties in Zagreb, where he taught at the Zagreb Theological Seminary as well as serving as a parish priest in several neighboring towns (including Varaždin). He rejected the invite by the Kaptol, Zagreb to become rector of the Croatian Institute in Bologna, as well invites to the courts of Ivan III Drašković, Petar Zrinski and Vuk II Krsto Frankopan.

=== Time in Russia ===
Križanić managed to secure permission from the papacy for a brief visit to Moscow from 25 October to 19 December 1647 as part of a Polish embassy. However, he was not able to secure permission for a prolonged stay in the Tsardom of Muscovy until 1658 (permission was retracted shortly after being issued, a fact that Križanić simply ignored) and he did not arrive in Moscow until 17 September 1659. He was assigned the duty of translating Latin and Greek documents and of preparing an improved Slavic grammar. However, he was exiled to Siberia on 20 January 1661. The reason for his exile remains unknown. Possible explanations put forward have included the fact that he was a Roman Catholic priest, his criticism of Russian society and of the Greeks, with whom Patriarch Nikon of Moscow (in office: 1652-1666) was attempting reconciliation, and other political and social motives. Križanić postulated that he was exiled because of "some foolish thing" he had said to someone, and that whatever he had said had been mentioned to the authorities.

After having lived roughly a year and a half in the Russian capital, Križanić arrived in Tobolsk in Siberia, on 8 March 1661. He lived there for 15 years, surviving on a state stipend and working on the treatises On Divine Providence, On Politics, and On Interpretation of Historic Prognostications, amongst others. In these books, written in his self-devised "Common Slavonic language" (a Pan-Slavonic grammar named Grammatitchno Iskaziniye that incorporated numerous Slavic languages), he set forth a comprehensive program of reforms proposed for the Muscow state, including reforms to public administration, Russian serfdom, economic policy, education, grammar, and Russia's primitive agricultural system. Many of the reforms he recommended were in fact carried out by Peter the Great (r. 1682–1725), although there is no concrete evidence of Križanić's direct influence in his doing so. Križanić's Politika which he wrote between 1663 and 1666, was published by Peter Bezsonov ( Muscovy in the Seventeenth Century, 1859–60) and for the first time in English in 1985, and is his most well-known and influential work.

His appeal to the Tsar to head the Slavs in the fight against the Germans shows a remarkable political foresight. Tsar Aleksei died in January 1676; Križanić was freed from exile by the new Tsar, Feodor III on 5 March 1676.

=== Final years ===
Križanić remained in Moscow until 1678, when he travelled to Vilnius and later to Warsaw. He lived in Poland and joined the Jesuits, under personal name of Augustinus. He accompanied a Polish force on its way to liberate besieged Vienna from the Ottomans during the 1683 Battle of Vienna. He died near Vienna on 12 September 1683 while participating with the Ukrainian troops fighting alongside the troops of the Polish king Jan Sobieski in the city's defence against the Ottoman Empire.

== Ideas and theories ==
Križanić was one of the earliest proponents of Pan-Slavism. The language he created and used in his writing was called Ruski jezik ("Russian language"), but in reality it was a mixture of several Slavic languages and was devised to serve as a symbol of and even to promote Slavic unity. He wanted to unite the Slavic nations under the Russian Tsar and unite Catholic and Orthodox against the German Protestants and Turkish Muslims.

A key component of Križanić's theories concerning necessary reforms for the Russian state were his "Five Principles of Power." His five principles were: Full autocracy (essentially absolute monarchy), closed borders, compulsory labor or a ban on idleness, government monopoly of foreign trade, and ideological conformity. Križanić argued that Russia would be strengthened if immigration were tightly restricted and if native Russians were prohibited from leaving the country without justification. The autocrat should use his power to eliminate bad customs, modernize the country and give the nobles and clergy privileges on the model to the Western Ständestaat.

When in 1652 was accepted in the Pontifical Croatian College of St. Jerome in Rome, insisted that the Illyrian lands and language supervised by the Brotherhood of St. Jerome should also include Carniola, Styria and Carinthia, but in 1656 the Roman Rota declared that the Illyrian lands include only Dalmatia, Croatia, Slavonia and Bosnia, and the Illyrian language spoken in these regions. Križanić in his works related to the language, and the Illyrian language, intended and used his native Croatian language.

His works, which also include writings on music and economics, were re-discovered and printed in the mid-19th century.

== Important works ==
- The Križanić Memorandum of 1641 (1641)
- Asserta Musicalia (1656)
- Gramatično izkazanje ob ruskom jeziku (1659-1666)
- On Politics also known as the Politika (in original "Razgovory o vladatelstvu") (1666)
- On Divine Providence (in original "De Providentia Dei") (1667)
- Holy Baptism (1669)
- An Interpretation of Historical Prophesies (1674)
- Chinese Foreign Trade (1675)
- History of Siberia (1680)

== Sources ==
- Vatroslav Jagić: Istoriia slavianskoi filologii, St. Petersburg, 1910
- James H. Billington (29 December 1985). "The First Kremlinologist". New York Times.
