= Joakim Stulić =

Ragusan lexicographer

Joakim Stulić.

Joakim Stulić, also Joakim Stulli as styled by himself, (1730–1817) was a lexicographer from the Republic of Ragusa, the author of the biggest dictionary in the older Croatian lexicography.

== Biography ==
He was born in Dubrovnik, where he received his primary education and continued his studies in the Jesuit college and at the Franciscan monastery, where he studied philosophy and theology. Then he moved to Rome, where he studied theology at the central Franciscan site of learning in the Aracoeli monastery for three years. Stulić returned to Dubrovnik and started his lexicographic work around 1760, which would last for half a century, until 1810.

Stulli's lifetime achievement was his Latin–Italian–"Illyrian" dictionary.

In the beginning, Stulić's sources were the dictionary of Ardelio Della Bella, the lexicographic efforts of the Akademija ispraznijeh (Academy of the Idle) from Dubrovnik, and the Turin Dictionary, the best Italian academic dictionary of the 18th century. He also collected material from literary works and oral sources.

Stulli started looking for new material and a suitable printing press in the early 1770s, when he visited Rome, Venice and Vienna in 1772 and 1773. His search for a sponsor and printer then took him to Bohemia, Saxony and Prussia. When his work was finished, he first contacted the Bohemian court administration in 1783. They initiated the procedure of verifying whether the work was good enough for printing. Since Stulić used the writing style of Dubrovnik/Dalmatia, a special imperial commission gathered in Vienna in 1785, including Antun Mandić, Joso Krmpotić, Marijan Lanosović and Stulić. The commission decided that the Slavonian scripting style would be used.

When all the linguistic, stylistic, monetary and printing obstacles were removed, the publication started. It was only in 1801 in Buda that the first part of the dictionary (Lexicon latino–italico–illyricum) was published. The second part came out four years later (1805) in Dubrovnik (Rjecsosloxje u komu donosuse upotrebljenia, uredna, mucsnia istieh jezika krasnoslovja nacsini, izgovaranja i prorjecsja). The third part was also published in Dubrovnik, in 1810 (Vocabolario italiano-illirico-latino).

Each part of the dictionary has two volumes. Its preparation used almost all the older Croatian dictionaries and the works of around one hundred writers. Stulić's dictionary is the largest work of older Croatian lexicography (more than 4,700 pages and around 80,000 words).

== See also ==
- Republic of Ragusa
- List of notable Ragusans
- Dubrovnik
- Dalmatia
- History of Dalmatia

== Works ==
- Illyric–Latin–Italian dictionary, composed of three parts:
  - Lexicon latino–italico–illyricum (Buda, 1801)
  - Joakima Stulli Dubrocsanina Rjecsoslòxje Illir.Ital.Lat. (Dubrovnik, 1806)
  - Vocabolario italiano–illyrico–latino (Dubrovnik, 1810)
