= Josip Mrzljak =

Croatian bishop

- Bishop Emeritus of Varaždin
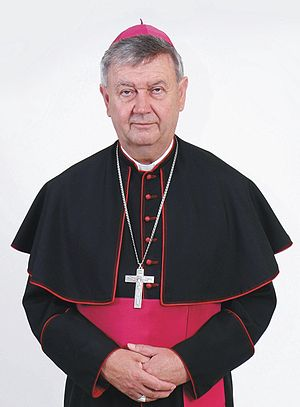
- Church: Roman Catholic Church
- Appointed: 20 March 2007
- Term ended: 1 August 2019
- Predecessor: Marko Culej
- Successor: Bože Radoš

Orders
- Ordination: 16 November 1969 (Priest) by Franjo Kuharić
- Consecration: 6 February 1999 (Bishop) by Josip Bozanić

Personal details
- Born: 19 January 1944 (age 82) Vukovar, Independent State of Croatia (modern Croatia)

Coat of arms of Josip Mrzljak

Josip Mrzljak (born 19 January 1944, in Vukovar) was the bishop of the Roman Catholic Diocese of Varaždin from 2007 to 2019.

His father Vladimir went missing in 1945, and is thought to have been killed by the Yugoslav Partisans. Mrzljak was ordained a priest in 1969 by Cardinal Franjo Kuharić.

Pope John Paul II appointed him auxiliary bishop of Zagreb on 29 December 1998 and he was consecrated a bishop on 6 February 1999.

Pope Benedict XVI named him Bishop of Varaždin on 20 March 2007.

Pope Francis accepted his resignation on 1 August 2019.
