= Jelena Brajša =

Croatian Catholic social worker and humanitarian (1935–2021)

- Born: 18 August 1935; Zagreb
- Died: 5 November 2021 (aged 86)
- Burial place: Mirogoj
- Education: Seminar für kirchliche Frauenberufe (Vienna)
- Occupations: humanitarian, social worker
- Organization: Croatian Caritas
- Children: 7 (4 adopted)
- Awards: City of Zagreb Award (1993)

Jelena (Jelka) Brajša (18 August 1935 – 5 November 2021) was a Croatian humanitarian and social worker, long-term president of the Caritas of the Archdiocese of Zagreb (1966–2005). She helped in establishment of several reception centers and homes for abandoned children, handicapped, old and infirm. She has been working on collecting aid for war victims during the Croatian War of Independence. She was known as "The Angel of Zagreb" and "Croatian Mother Teresa".

== Early life and education ==
She was born in Zagreb in 1935 as a youngest, thirteenth child in the Catholic family. Her father was jurist. She attended elementary and middle school in Zagreb. With the establishment of the communist Yugoslavia, her family was labeled as a "class enemy" and she was prevented from studying. In 1958 she went to Vienna, where she studied social work and religious pedagogy at the Seminar für kirchliche Frauenberufe, with the scholarship granted to her by the cardinal Franz König. She further educated in Paris and Lourdes.

== Humanitarian work ==
Cardinal Franjo Šeper appointed her in 1966 as a director of the Caritas of the Archdiocese of Zagreb. She suffered several public attacks for her caritative work. The communist authorities labeled her activities as "illegal work". Although Caritas was not recognized by the Yugoslav authorities, social workers and police officers referred mothers with children to Brajša and Caritas' workers or brought them abandoned children.

Under her organization, Caritas had about 260 employees, 33 houses and institutions where about 400 children and 200 adults are housed. She worked in Caritas for 39.5 years. She was also long-term president of the Humanitarian Network of Croatia (HMH).

She was editor-in-chief of the Betanija ("Bethany") magazine (hr), Archdiocese of Zagreb's magazine for patients. Besides native Croatian, she also spoke German and French language.

=== Abandoned children ===
From July 6, 1969, when she took care of the first abandoned child, until her death in 2021, Zagreb's Caritas took care of more than 5,000 abandoned children. After Glas Koncila published about the case of the first received child, from July to December 1969 Zagreb's Caritas received 70 unwanted or abandoned children. From 1969 to 1990, Brajša and her co-workers from Caritas housed abandoned newborns at the Archbishop's House at Kaptol, Zagreb. Carmelite nuns from Vrhovec also took care of some infants. Daughters of Divine Charity also took care of the children and their education. The first house for around twenty abandoned children was opened in Vugrovec. In 1983, the centre for occupational therapy and rehabilitation "St. Vincent de Paul" was opened in Oborovo. In 1991, abandoned newborn and infants were relocated from Kaptol to a newly opened house in Savica-Šanci. In 1994, with the financial aid of Austrian Caritas and foreign donors, Caritas home for children victims of war was opened in Brezovica.

== Personal life ==
She adopted four children who bear her family name and three more children whom she took in but who she did not officially adopt.

The oldest adopted child is Tomislav Brajša, musician and singer. He was born in a hospital in Pula, where his biological mother left him. Although he was not born blind, due to the negligence of the doctors he went blind in the incubator.

Her youngest adopted son Tomi Brajša, born without both legs, is a paraswimmer and he competed for Croatia at the 2021 Summer Paralympics.

In February 2004, she was operated on for a brain tumor.

== Awards ==
She received several awards for her work:

- Albert Schweitzer Medal (1992)
- City of Zagreb Award (1993)
- "Dr Kurt Waldheim" Award (1993)
- Person of the dialogue-Person of the year by Croatian Academic Association (1998)
- Humanist of the world (2000)
- Medal with the image of the Mother of God of the Stone Gate (2008)

== Remembrance ==
- Documentary "Jelena Brajsa, der Engel von Zagreb" ("Jelena Brajša, the Angel of Zagreb") by Robert Neumüller for ORF.

== Bibliography ==
=== Journals ===
- Brajša, Jelena (1972). "Karitas u službi života" [Caritas in the service of life]. Obnovljeni Život (in Croatian). 27 (6): 628–635.
- Brajša, Jelena (1979). "Djeca bez roditelja i roditelji bez djece" [Children without parents and parents without children]. Obnovljeni Život (in Croatian). 34 (6): 558–562.
- Brajša, Jelena (1993). "Caritas Zagrebačke nabiskupije" [Caritas of the Archdiocese of Zagreb]. Bogoslovska smotra (in Croatian). 63 (3–4): 432–435.

=== Conference proceedings ===
- "Djelotvorna ljubav Caritasa i Crkve prema žrtvama rata od 1991. do danas" ("The effective love of Caritas and the Church towards the victims of war from 1991 until today") in: Šeparović, Zvonimir, ed. (1998). Hrvatski žrtvoslov : zbornik radova Prvog hrvatskog žrtvoslovnog kongresa, Zagreb, 19. do 21. lipnja 1998 (in Croatian). Zagreb: Hrvatsko žrtvoslovno društvo. pp. 441–448. ISBN 9539734010.
- "Osnutak Caritasa Zagrebačke nadbiskupije" ("Foundation of Caritas of the Archdiocese of Zagreb"), in: Tanjić, Željko, ed. (2003). Veritatem facientes in caritate: zbornik radova Međunarodnoga simpozija o kardinalu Franji Šeperu povodom 20. obljetnice smrti (in Croatian). Zagreb: Glas Koncila; Kršćanska sadašnjost. ISBN 9536258862.
- "Solidarnost sa siromasima" ("Solidarity with the poor"), in: Cvek, Antun; Cvitanović, Marija, eds. (2005). Biskup Josip Lang - prijatelj siromaha : zbornik sa Simpozija održanoga 6. studenoga 2004. u Zagrebu, prigodom 80. godišnjice smrti biskupa Josipa Langa (in Croatian). Zagreb: Zaklada biskup Josip Lang. pp. 39–43. ISBN 953998324X.
