= Tommaso Raggio =

16th-century Jesuit missionary

- Born: 1531; Forlì, Papal States (modern-day Italy)
- Died: 1599
- Other names: Radius, Raggius
- Occupation(s): Jesuit missionary, Papal diplomat

Tommaso Raggio (Latin: Thomas Razzius) (1531–1599) was a 16th century Jesuit missionary.

Raggio joined Jesuit order in 1557 in Loreto.

Raggio was Catholic missionary in Kotor in 1574–75. Raggio was a poliglot who knew six foreign languages, including Croatian. According to Miroslav Vanino, Raggio learned Croatian language in Kotor so he later worked for the benefit of Croats and other Balkan people. Raggio emphasized that Jesuit presence in Kotor is very important because Kotor was very near Serbia while Kotor Bay goes deep into the territory populated with Orthodox people.

In 1577 Raggio was one of two Jesuit envoys sent by Pope to Maronite patriarch. In 1582 Raggio became a rector of Illyrian College in Loreto. Between 1584 and 1587 Raggio accompanied Tommaso Pelessa at his missionary journeys into Ottoman held territories. At the beginning of 1594 Raggio and Aleksandar Komulović, as apostolic visitors, began their diplomatic mission aimed to forge an anti-Ottoman coalition in support of the West during the Long Turkish War, principally in the Balkans and among the Slavs.

In 1595, the two missionaries visited Albania. Prior to their mission in this region, they translated and publicized the first catechism in Albanian. During his stay, Raggio handed 500 copies of the work over to the locals. Later in the same year, Raggio left the mission and returned to Italy.

== Sources ==
- Vanino, Miroslav (1986). Vrela i prinosi. Nova tiskara.
- Frazee, Charles A. (2006) [1983]. Catholics and Sultans: The Church and the Ottoman Empire 1453-1923. Cambridge: Cambridge University Press. ISBN 9780521027007.
- Pagano, Sergio (2008). La nunziatura di Ludovico Taverna: (25 febbraio 1592 - 4 aprile 1596). Istituto Storico Italiano per l'Età Moderna e Contemporanea.
- Murzaku, Ines A. (2017). "Ad maiorem Dei gloriam: The Jesuits in Albania". George Fox University - Occasional Papers on Religion in Eastern Europe. 37 (6).
