= Marko Kuzmić =

Croatian writer and Franciscan

Marko Kuzmić or Kuzmičević or Kuzmićević (c. 1695 – after 22 May 1735) was a Croatian writer and a Franciscan.

Marko Kuzmić was born c. 1695 in Sutomišćica. He finished the novitiate among the Illyrian clergy of the Third Order of Saint Francis in Galovac and took religious vows in 1712. Kuzmić was a custos of the friary in Sustipanac in 1719 and 1735 and Galovac in 1727 and served as the secretary of the Franciscan Province of Dalmatia from 1729 to 1734.

Kuzmić authored the proceedings of the church speeches and Christian doctrine titled Govorenia duhovna ('Spiritual Talks') intended for deacons and young friars. The first part of the work, which contains 47 speeches regarding specific subjects or holidays, was written in the friary in Zadar from 1724 to 1725, and the second part, which serves as a guide in pastoral theology and Christian doctrine in form of questions and answers, in Galovac in 1725.

Kuzmić was a proponent of the Glagolitic script, considering it more suitable for the Croatian language. Kuzmić adopted Ivan Ančić's table of Latin and Bosnian Cyrillic script, and replaced the Cyrillics with the Glagolitic script. He transcribed Krsto Pejkić's Zarcalo od jistine meju carkve istočne i zapadne ('The Mirror of Truth between the Eastern and the Western Church') from Bosnian Cyrillic to the Glagolitic script in Galovac in 1730. Kuzmić also authored Libar od razlikih pisam i kartulinov ('The Book of Various Poems and Writings').

Kuzmić wrote in Shtokavian dialect with a strong Chakavian influx and in cursive Glagolitic script.

== Bigliography ==
- Grčević, Mario; Franjić, Ivana (2011). "Posebnost Ančićeva slovopisa" [The uniqueness of Ančić's spelling]. In Knezović, Pavao (ed.). Zbornik o Ivanu Ančiću: Zbornik radova sa znanstvenog skupa "Fra Ivan Ančić Dumljanin, 1624.–1625.", Tomislavgrad, 13.–15. svibnja 2010 [Proceedings on Ivan Ančić: Proceedings from the scientific conference "Fra Ivan Ančić Dumljanin, 1624–1625", Tomislavgrad, 13–15 May 2010]. Zagreb: Hrvatski studij Sveučilišta u Zagrebu. ISBN 9789536682973.
- Šunjić, Ankica (2013). "Kuzmić, Marko". Croatian Biographical Lexicon (in Croatian). Zagreb: Leksikografski zavod Miroslav Krleža.
