= Marko Culej =

Croatian Roman Catholic bishop (1938–2006)

His Excellency, The Most Reverend Marko Culej
- Bishop of Varaždin
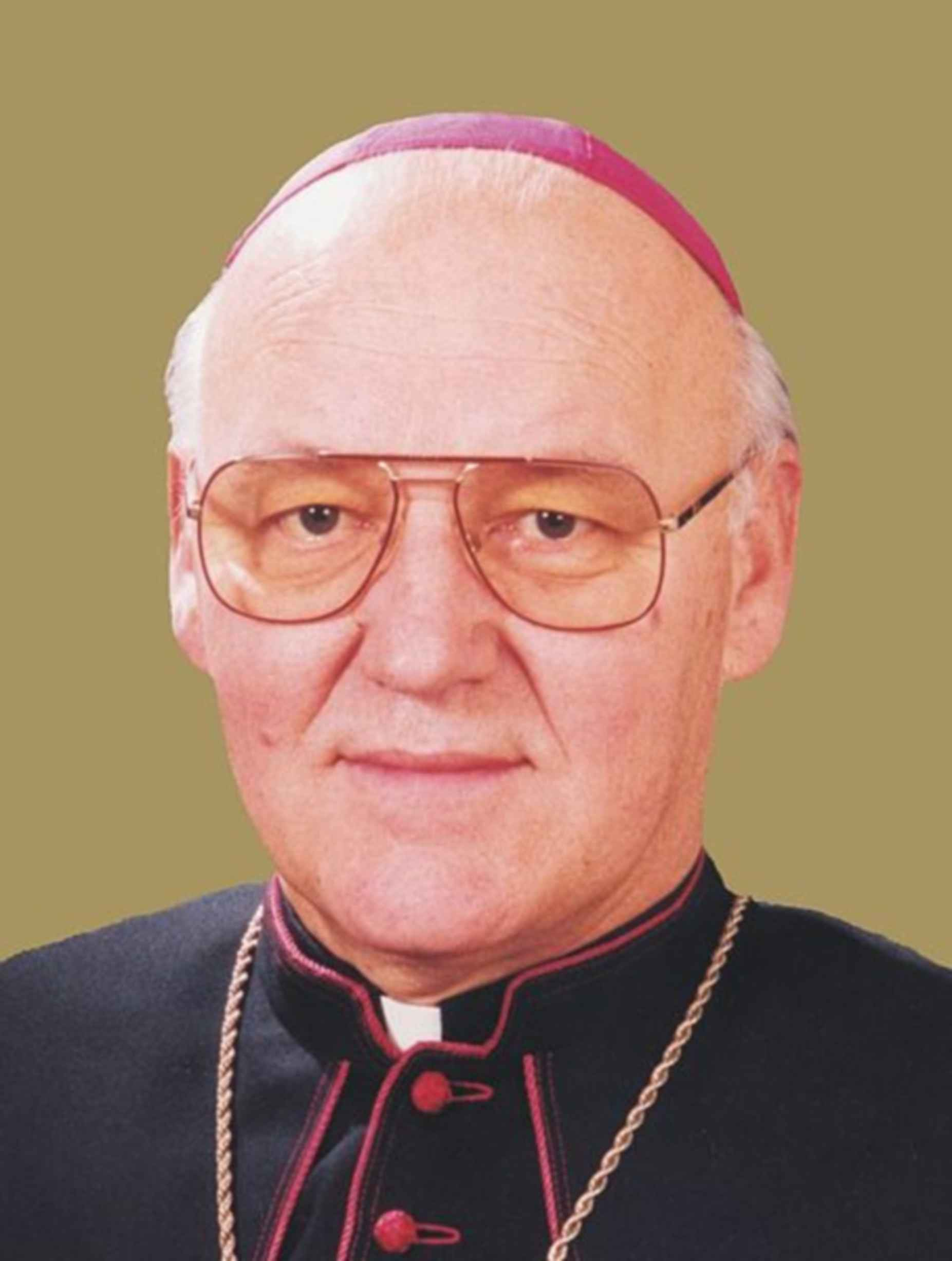
- Church: Roman Catholic Church
- Appointed: 5 July 1997
- Term ended: 19 August 2006
- Predecessor: New creation
- Successor: Josip Mrzljak
- Other posts: Rector of the Major Theological Seminary in Zagreb (1992–1993), Titular Bishop of Limata, Auxiliary Bishop of Archdiocese of Zagreb (1992–1997)

Orders
- Ordination: 24 April 1964 (Priest)
- Consecration: 22 February 1992 (Bishop) by Cardinal Franjo Kuharić

Personal details
- Born: Marko Culej; 19 January 1938 Repno, Kingdom of Yugoslavia (modern Croatia)
- Died: 19 August 2006 (aged 68) Varaždin, Croatia
- Education: University of Zagreb

Marko Culej (19 January 1938 – 19 August 2006) was a Croatian Catholic prelate who served as the first Bishop of Varaždin from 1997 until his death in 2006. He previously served as Auxiliary Bishop of Zagreb from 1992 to 1997.

== Early life and education ==
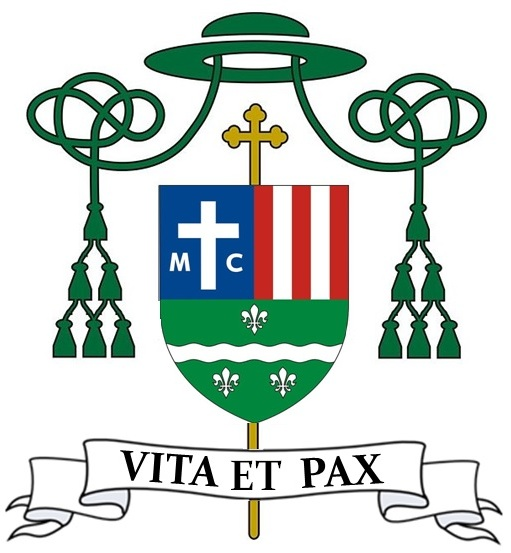
Coat of arms of Bishop Marko Culej

Culej was born into a Catholic family of Petar and Josipa (née Bočkal) near Zlatar in the Hrvatsko Zagorje region as one among six children.

After graduating from primary school in Belac in 1949, he continued at the Inter-Diocesan Minor Seminary in Zagreb, he consequently joined the Major Theological Seminary in Zagreb and at the same time the University of Zagreb in 1957. The next year he interrupted his studies for the compulsory service in the Yugoslavian Army (1958–1959), and returned to his priesthood formation in the seminary, where he studied until 1964, and was ordained as priest on April 24, 1964 for the Archdiocese of Zagreb, after completed his philosophical and theological studies.

== Early career ==
After ordination, Culej in 1964 served as assistant priest in Samobor, and from 1964 as assistant priest in Desinić. In January 1965, he became interim parish administrator for the local St. George church, and in July he was appointed parish administrator and remained there until September 1981, when he was relieved of his duties as parish administrator. From 1965 until 1975, he was also the temporary administrator in Poljana Sutlanska.

In September 1981, he was appointed a vice-rector of the Archbishop's Major Theological Seminary, a position he held until 1992. In 1986, in addition to the position of Vice-rector, Fr. Culej was appointed a canon of the Primate's Chapter of Zagreb and a head of the Archdiocesan Center for Spiritual Vocations. During 1992–1993 he served as a Rector of the Archbishop's Major Theological Seminary in Zagreb.

== Episcopacy ==
On January 7, 1992, he was appointed by Pope John Paul II as a Titular Bishop of Limata and an Auxiliary Bishop of the Archdiocese of Zagreb. On February 22, 1992, he was consecrated as bishop by Cardinal Franjo Kuharić and other prelates in the Cathedral of Assumption of Blessed Virgin Mary and St. Stephen of Hungary in Zagreb. On August 18, 1993, he was relieved of his duties as the Rector of the Theological Seminary and appointed a vicar general of the archdiocese.

Four years later, on July 5, 1997, Culej become the first bishop of the newly created Roman Catholic Diocese of Varaždin. He died while at the office on August 19, 2006, after a long and severe illness, at the age of 69 in Varaždin.

Catholic Church titles
Preceded by Edward Kisiel	Titular Bishop of Limata; 1992–1997	Succeeded by Marian Florczyk
New title	Diocesan Bishop of Varaždin; 1997–2006	Succeeded by Josip Mrzljak
