= Bartol Kašić =

Croatian clergyman and grammarian (1575–1650)

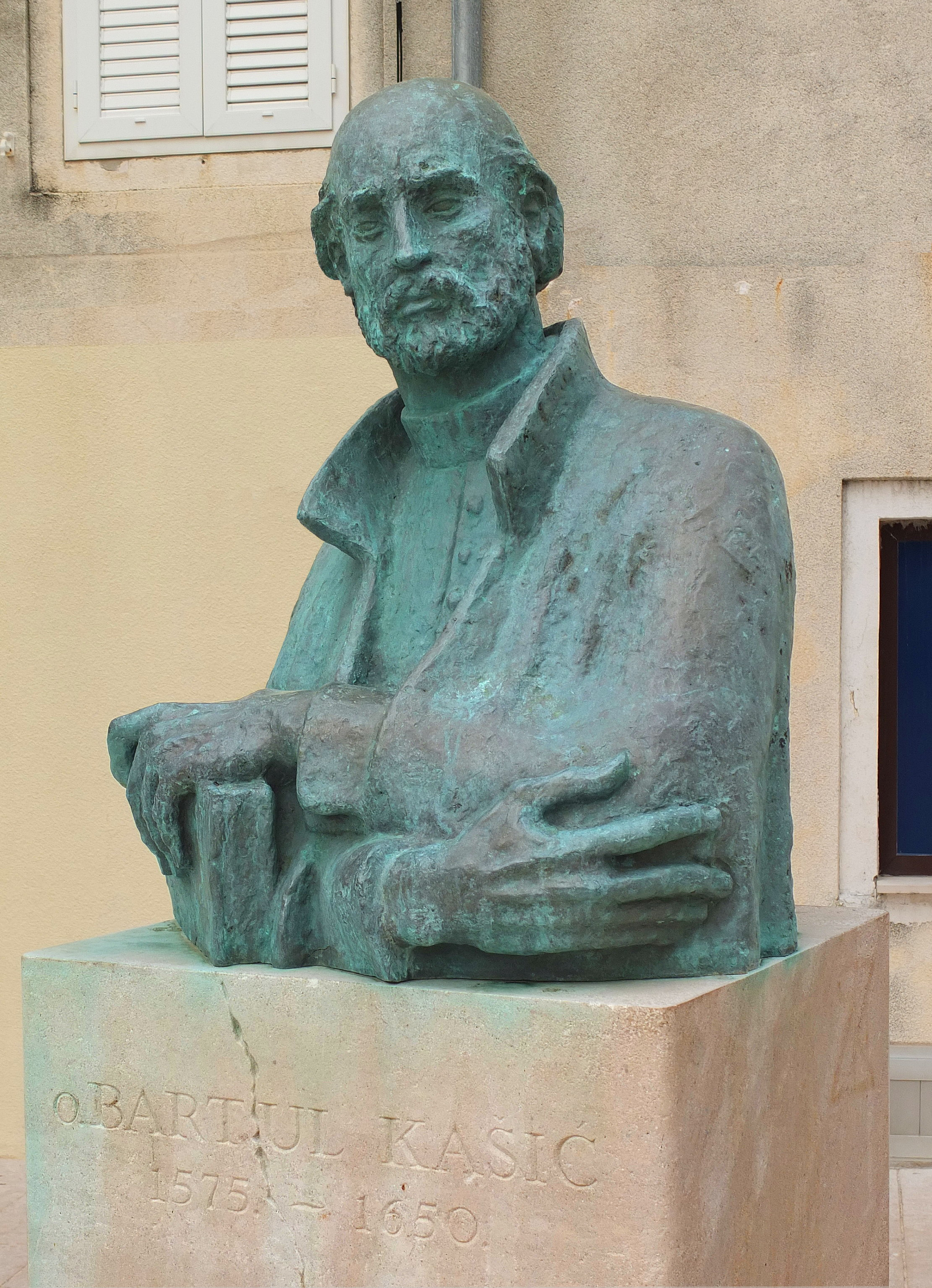
- Kašić bust in the Town of Pag
- Born: August 15, 1575; Pag, Republic of Venice (present-day Croatia)
- Died: December 28, 1650 (aged 75); Rome
- Other names: Bartul Kašić; Bogdančić (signature); Pažanin ("of Pag", signature)
- Citizenship: Republic of Ragusa, Republic of Venice
- Education: Illyric College in Loreto; Rome

Bartol Kašić (pronounced [bâːrtol kǎʃit͡ɕ]; Latin: Bartholomaeus Cassius, Italian: Bartolomeo Cassio; August 15, 1575 – December 28, 1650) was a Croatian Jesuit clergyman and grammarian during the Counter-Reformation, who wrote the first Illyrian grammar and translated the Bible and the Roman Rite into Illyrian (a name used for the early Croatian or Serbo-Croatian language).

== Life ==
Bartol was born in Pag, in the Republic of Venice (in modern Croatia) of his father Ivan Petar Kašić who participated in the 1571 Battle of Lepanto and mother Ivanica. In 1574 Ivan Petar Kašić married for Ivanica Bogdančić and they had a son Bartol next year. His father died when he was a small child, so he was raised by his uncle Luka Deodati Bogdančić, a priest from Pag, who taught him to read and write. He attended the municipal school in the town of Pag. After 1590 he studied at the Illyric College in Loreto near Ancona, in the Papal States (in modern Italy), managed by the Jesuits. As a gifted and industrious pupil, he was sent to further studies in Rome in 1593, where he joined the Society of Jesus in 1595. Kašić continued propaganda activities of Aleksandar Komulović after his death, being even greater Pan-Slav then Komulović was. Kašić censored and edited Komulović's 1606 work (Zrcalo od Ispovijesti).

Kašić was made a priest in 1606 and served as a confessor in the St. Peter's Basilica in Rome. He lived in Dubrovnik from 1609 to 1612. In 1612/13, disguised as a merchant, he went on a mission to the Ottoman provinces of Bosnia, central Serbia and eastern Slavonia (Valpovo, Osijek, Vukovar), which he reported to the pope. From 1614 to 1618 he was the Croatian confessor in Loreto. He went on his second mission in 1618/19. In old age, he described both missions in his incomplete autobiography. His second stay in Dubrovnik lasted from 1620 to 1633. Then he returned to Rome, where he spent the rest of his life.

== Literary activity ==
Already as a student, Kašić started teaching Illyrian in the Illyric Academy in Rome, which awakened his interest in Illyrian. By 1599, he made a Illyrian-Italian dictionary, one of the first Croatian dictionaries, which has been preserved as a manuscript in Dubrovnik since the 18th century. Some experts believe it is one of three dictionaries made by Kašić and that the other two are archived in Perugia and Oxford.

Kašić's native dialect was Chakavian. In the 16th century, the Chakavian dialect was prevalent in Croatian works, though it now shifted towards the Shtokavian. Kašić opted for Shtokavian as it was the most common dialect among his South Slavic (Illyrian) people.

=== The first Illyrian grammar ===
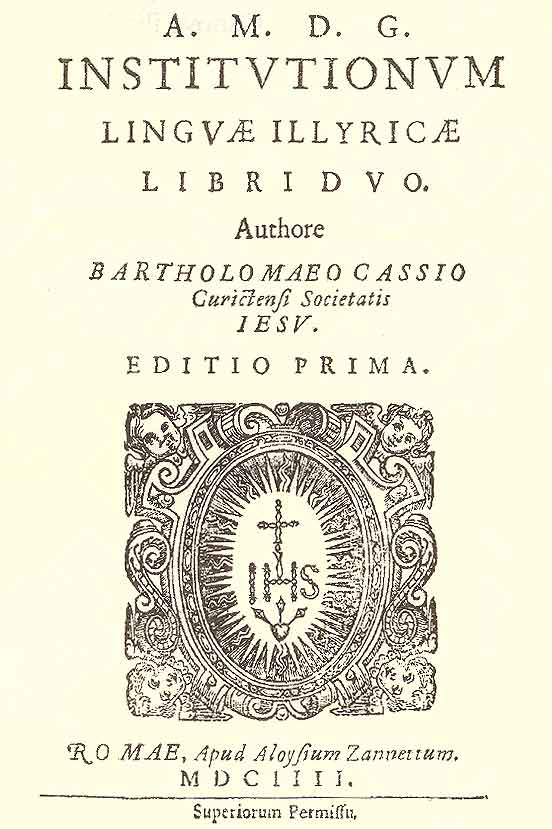
The first edition of Kašić's grammar in Rome in 1604

It qualified Kašić for further work in Illyrian. Since the Jesuits took care of the Christians in the Ottoman Empire and tried to teach in the local language, they needed an adequate textbook for working among the Croats. In 1582, Marin Temperica wrote a report to general Claudio Acquaviva in which he emphasized the importance of the Slavic language understandable all over the Balkans. In this report of Temperica requested publishing of the Illyrian language dictionaries and grammars. Based on this request, Kašić provided such a textbook; he published Institutionum linguae illyricae libri duo ("The Structure of the Illyrian Language in Two Books") in Rome in 1604. It was the first Slavic language grammar.

In under 200 pages and two parts ("books"), he provided basic information on Illyrian and explained the Illyrian morphology in great detail. The language is basically Shtokavian with many Chakavian elements, mixing older and newer forms. For unknown reasons, the grammar was not accompanied by a dictionary, as was the practice with Jesuit dictionaries and grammars of Illyrian.

In 1612–1613 and then again in 1618–1620, Kašić visited various regions of Ottoman Serbia, Bosnia, and Croatia. After 1613 Kašić published several works of religious and instructive content and purpose (the lives of the saints Ignatius of Loyola and Francis Xavier, the lives of Jesus and Mary), a hagiographic collection Perivoj od djevstva (Virginal Garden; 1625 and 1628), two catechisms, and so on. In late 1627, he completed the spiritual tragedy St. Venefrida, subtitled triomfo od čistoće (a triumph of purity), which remained in manuscript until 1938.

=== Translation of the Bible ===
In 1622, Kašić started translating the New Testament into the local Slavic vernacular – more precisely, the Shtokavian dialect of Dubrovnik. In 1625, he was in charge of translating the entire Bible. He submitted the entire translation in Rome in 1633 to obtain the approval for printing, but he encountered difficulties because some Croatians were against translations in that vernacular.

Considering the fact that the translations of the Bible to local languages had a crucial role in the creation of the standard languages of many peoples, the ban on Kašić's translation has been described by Josip Lisac as "the greatest catastrophe in the history of Croatian". The preserved manuscripts were used to publish the translation, with detailed expert notes, in 2000.

The linguistic variety and invention of his translation can be seen from a comparison with the King James Version of the Bible. The King James Version, which has had a profound impact on the English, was published in 1611, two decades before Kašić's translation. It has 12,143 different words. Kašić's Croatian translation, even incomplete (some parts of the Old Testament are missing), has around 20,000 different words.

=== Roman Rite ===
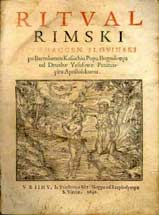
Ritual rimski, 1640

Ritual rimski ("Roman Rite", 1640), covering more than 400 pages, was the most famous Kašić's work, which was used by all Croatian dioceses and archdioceses except for the one in Zagreb, which also accepted it in the 19th century.

Kašić called the language used in Ritual rimski as naški ("our language") or bosanski ("Bosnian"). He used the term "Bosnian" even though he was born in a Chakavian region: instead he decided to adopt a "common language" (lingua communis), a version of Shtokavian Ikavian, spoken by the majority the speakers of Croatian in Bosnia. He used the terms dubrovački ("Dubrovnikan") for the Ijekavian version used in his Bible, and dalmatinski (Dalmatian) for the Chakavian version.

== Works ==
- Razlika skladanja slovinska (Croatian-Italian dictionary), Rome, 1599
- Institutionum linguae illyricae libri duo (The Structure of the Illyrian (Croatian) Language in Two Books), Rome, 1604
- Various hagiographies; collection Perivoj od djevstva (Virginal Garden; 1625 and 1628) *Two catechisms
- Spiritual tragedy St Venefrida, 1627, published in 1938
- The Bible, 1633
- Apologia latina adversus asserentes versionem illyricam Sacrae Scripturae esse a s. Hieronymo Dalmata doctore maximo scriptam [Latin Apology Against Those who State that the Illyrian Version of the Sacred Scriptures was Translated by Saint Jerome the Great Dalmatian Doctor] (in Latin). 1633. Manuscript.
  - Transcribed and translated in Horvat, Vladimir (2011). "Apologija Bartola Kašića". Filologija (57) (published 2012-03-13): 67–132. eISSN 1848-8919.
- Ritual rimski (Roman Rite), 1640
