= Coat of arms of Dubrovnik =

Coat of arms

Versions
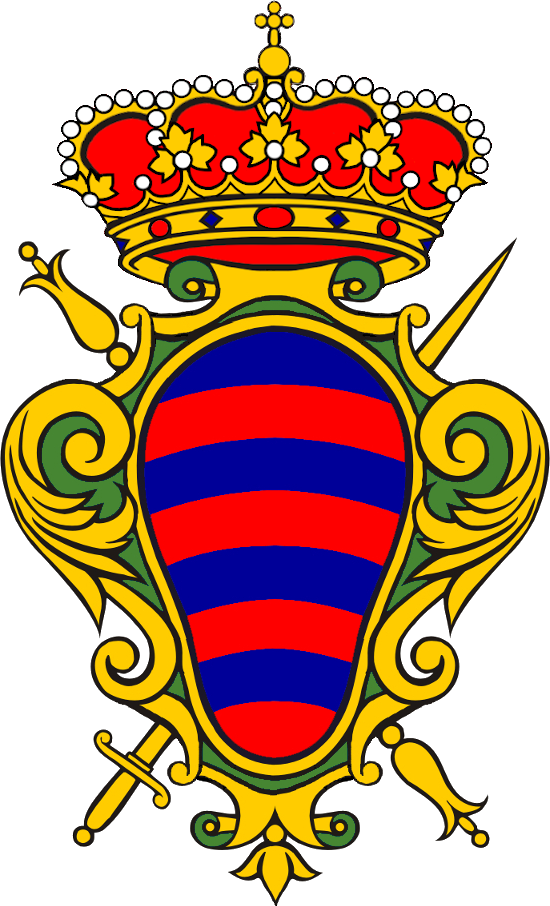
- Alternative version used in documents since the 18th century

- Current coat of arms of the city of Dubrovnik
- Armiger: Mato Franković, Mayor of Dubrovnik

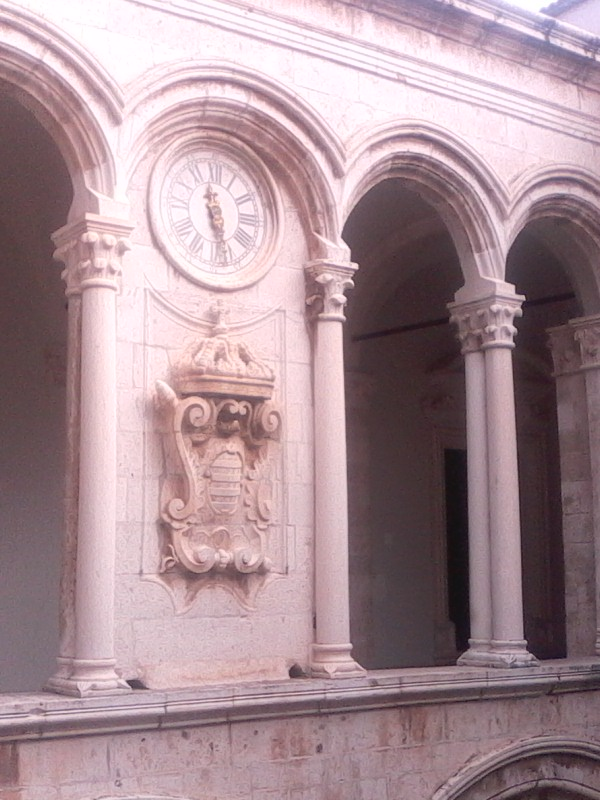
Coat of arms in the Rector's Palace in Dubrovnik

The Coat of arms of Dubrovnik was the heraldic symbol of the historical Republic of Ragusa. It is today used in a variant for the city of Dubrovnik, Croatia. Its basic appearance is based on the coat of arms of the Árpád dynasty.

== History ==
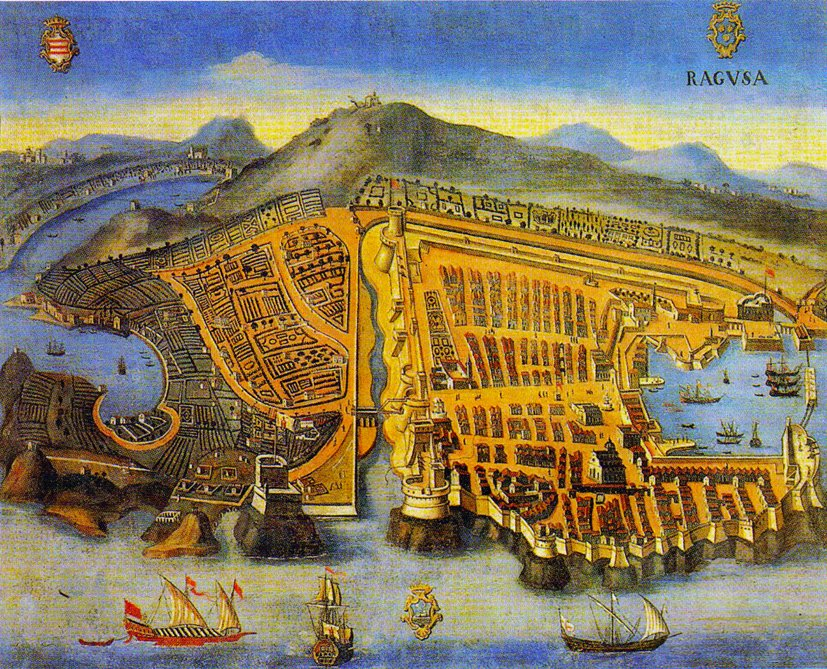
Painting of Dubrovnik (17th century) - arms in upper corner

During the intermittent administration of Dubrovnik by Byzantine Empire, which lasted until 1205, the use of heraldic symbols such as coat of arms was not in practice. The city used Byzantine imperial flags until 1171. When Dubrovnik passed to the Republic of Venice the official symbol became the Lion of Saint Mark. With the end of the Venetian rule all the symbols of the previous government were removed, with only one stone tablet remaining showing the Venetian lion.

=== Coat of arms with red and white bars ===
With the Treaty of Zadar the Republic of Venice relinquished its claims on the eastern coast of the Adriatic in favour of Louis I and the Venetians left Dubrovnik for good. With the Treaty of Visegrád in 1358, between Dubrovnik and Louis I., they have committed to use his flag or coat of arms which contained the mentioned arms of Árpád dynasty (red and white bars). In 1359 they ordered flags to be made from Venice containing the arms of Kingdom of Hungary and in 1362 they also ordered flags with Saint Blaise. According to some sources the use of the Hungarian arms depended on various foreign policy conditions and so the government of the Republic of Ragusa issued an order to all ship captains that they should not assert any other symbols except those of the Republic (with Saint Blaise) and those of the Hungarian kingdom.

In Dubrovnik the coat of arms with the red and white bars became widely accepted as the arms of the Republic and as such the Republic kept its use even after the Republic of Ragusa became independent from the affairs of the Kingdom of Hungary. Although it was recognized as a sign of submission to the King, the arms were now generally accepted as a sign of sovereignty of the Dubrovnik Republic. However, unlike the Hungarian coat of arms, which begins with a red bar at the top, the Ragusan coat of arms was inverted so that it began with a white bar, and that version eventually prevailed.

One of the rare (and possibly the only) traces of the arms description in written form is mentioned in a book about voting customs and regulations of the Republic called Copioso ristretto degli annali di Rausa by Jakov Lukarić (Giacomo Di Pietro Luccari) published in Venice 1605. On page 155 of the book, while describing the electoral procedure, Lukarić mentions the ballot boxes with the arms of the Republic - four white bars on a red shield. These arms were in use until the dissolution of the Republic in 1808.

There are numerous examples of the arms:

- Rector's Palace - painting of Saint Blaise from 15th century. The arms can be observed in the upper corner of the painting.
- Rector's Palace - memorial painting of Vladislav Bučić (de Bucchia) from 17th century, by the side of the memorial there are arms of the republic with white and red bars.
- Rector's Palace - painting of Dubrovnik from the 17th century before the 1667 Dubrovnik earthquake showing the arms in the upper left corner.
- Pavao Ritter Vitezović - Stematographia sive armorum illiricorum delineatio, descriptio et restitutio (published in Vienna, 1701). On the front page it shows the arms of the Republic
- Antonio Primi - La legga dell' honesta e del valore (published in Venice, 1703). On the front page there are arms with white bars, although the book was printed in black and white it is commonly concluded that the dark colored bars represent the red.
- Matija Alberti - Oficij B. Marie D. (published in Venice, 1617). Shows the arms on the front page in black and white.
- Stjepan Gradić - Peripateticae philosophiae pronunciata shows the arms of the Republic on the front page in black and white.
- Sponza Palace (in Dubrovnik) - On the main doors from 18th century.
- Credentials of Bartolomeo Lodovico Ghiglione, consul of the Dubrovnik Republic in London from 1790. The arms are identical in appearance to the official arms of city of Dubrovnik in use today, but with blue and red bars.

Today the original Árpád version of arms (red and white bars) are the official arms of the city of Dubrovnik.

=== Coat of arms with blue and red bars ===
Arms of other colors, predominantly blue and red bars, also appear on several historical documents, and some researchers believe that these arms mostly varied in color due to the personal interpretation of the authors who made them.

Due to different interpretations of the arms, white (silver) bars started to be replaced by blue bars somewhere at the end of the 18th century. Beginning with the 18th century some arms interpretations started to show white bars being decorated with blue template lines within them until the end of the 18th century when arms with fully blue bars started to appear. In the State Archive of Dubrovnik there is a map of the Republic of Ragusa (1747) made by Mihajlo Pešić. On the lower end of the map the arms of the Republic are visible showing white and red bars, with the white bars being richly decorated with blue template lines within them.

One of the most significant Armorials for Dubrovnik heraldic legacy is the one by Ivo Saraka. It can also be seen in the transcription book of Dubrovnik law codes, most likely compiled around the year 1746. It contains several pages of colored arms of Dubrovnik nobility with the arms of the Republic on top. It shows the arms with blue and red lines, however blue lines are interlaced with decorative templates - wavy lines of different shades of blue. Vito Galzinski (who wrote on the heraldry of the Republic) considers that the author's intention was to emphasize the silver coating of the bars. That same manuscript was also used for the procedure of confirming one's noble status and also as a base for the restoration of the mentioned armorial. During the restoration, which was finished in Split in 1956, the darkened silver-coated lines were completely colored blue. At that time there was no serious and systematic research of the history of the Ragusan coat of arms and it was widely believed that the colors were blue and red. The restored armorial is today kept in the Rector's Palace.

== Gallery ==
Árpád dynasty arms used and granted by Louis I

Arms of the Dubrovnik Republic - Pavao Ritter Vizezović (non-Ragusan source)

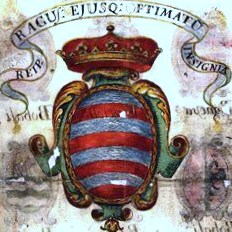
Arms on the map by Matija Pešić kept in State Archive

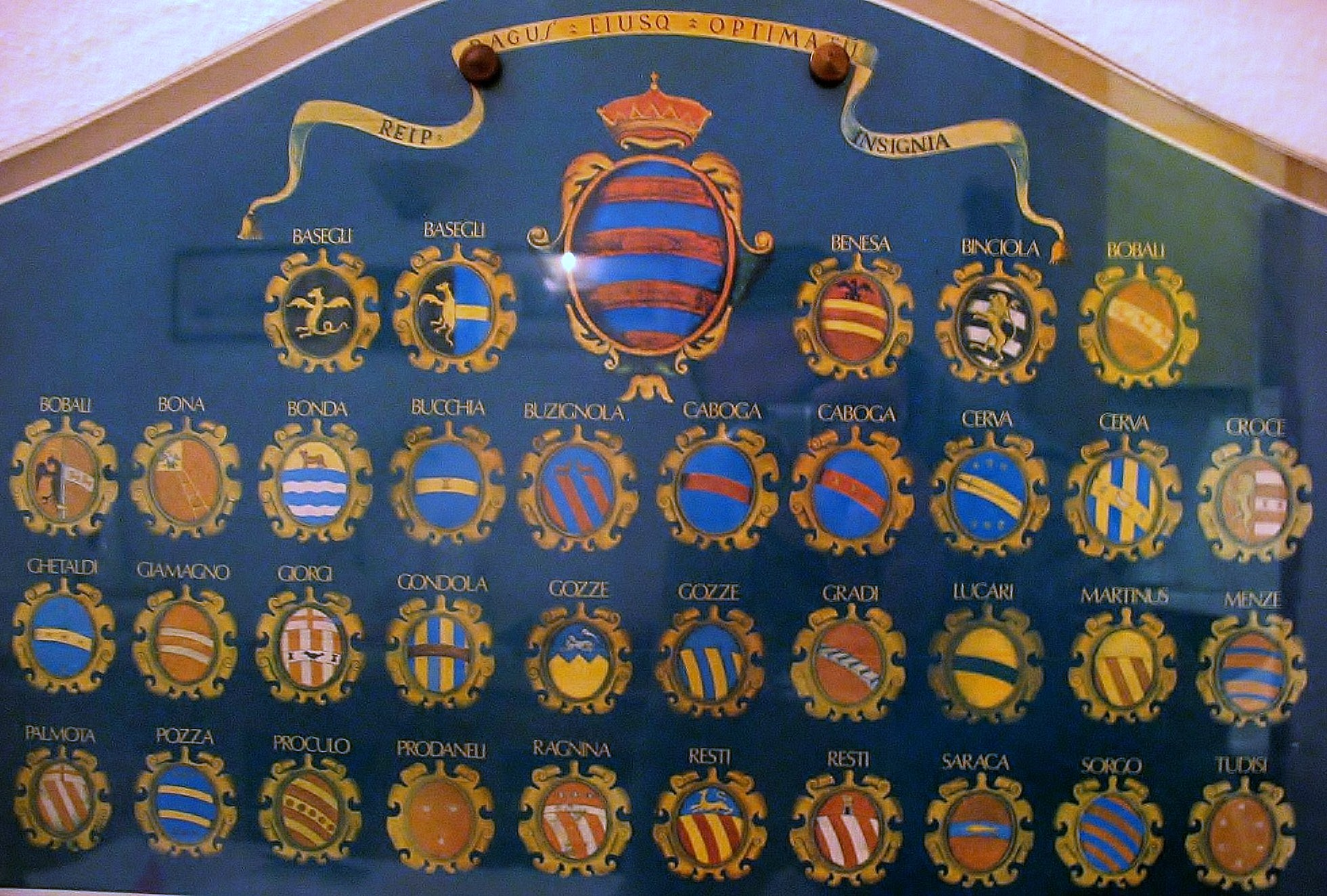
Arms of the Republic and Dubrovnik Nobility - Ivo Saraka

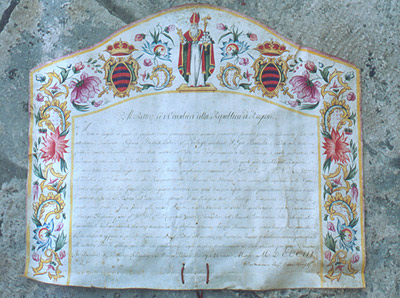
Arms with blue and red bars in Ragusan State Letters Patent

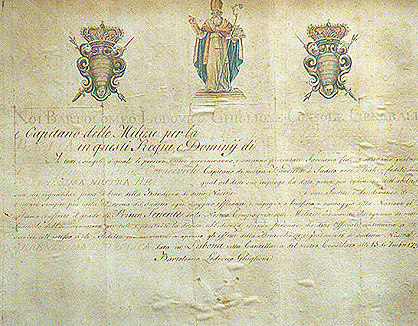
Arms with blue and red bars in a Ragusan Consular Diploma (the aforementioned credentials of Bartolomeo Lodovico Ghiglione)

== See also ==
- Flag of Dubrovnik
- Coat of arms of Dalmatia
- Dubrovnik
- Republic of Ragusa
- Coat of arms of Croatia
