= Ivan Ančić =

Croatian religious writer (1624–1685)

The Reverend Ivan Ančić OFM
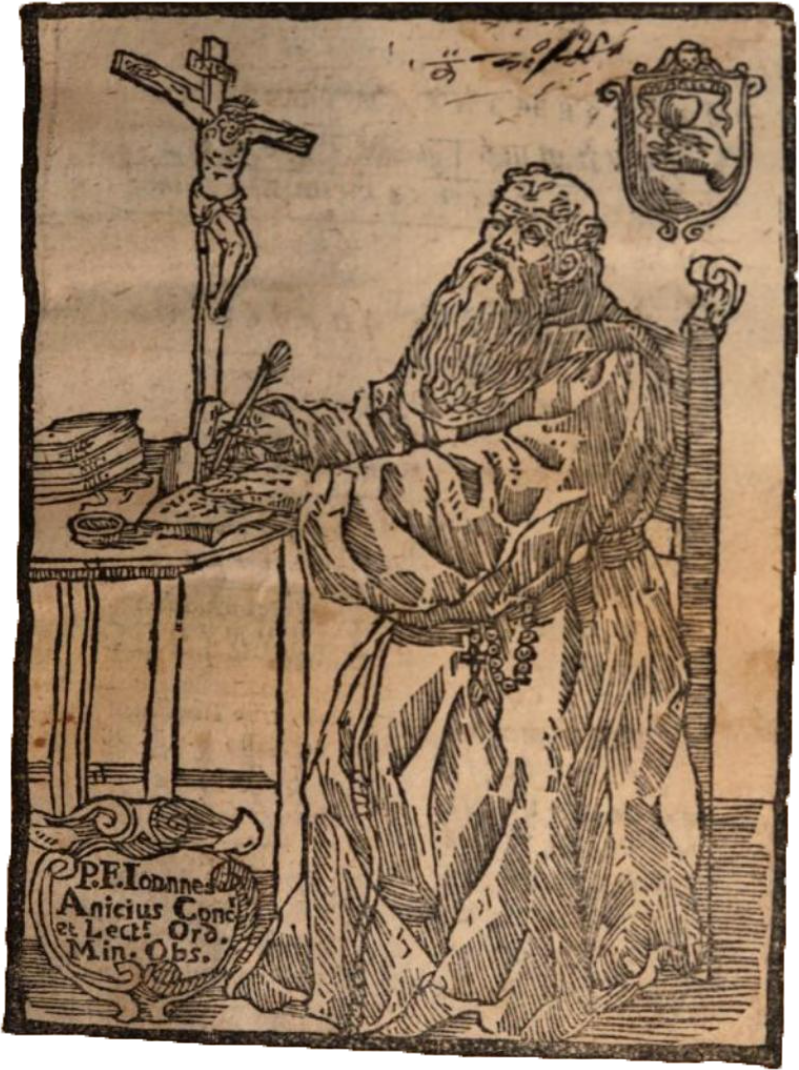
- Ivan Ančić's portrait from 1678
- Born: 11 February 1624; Lipa, Duvno, Herzegovina, Ottoman Empire
- Died: 24 July 1685 (aged 61); Ancona, Papal States
- Occupation: Franciscan priest
- Writing career
- Pen name: Dumljanin (Duvnoan)
- Language: Croatian (Illyrian)
- Period: Baroque
- Genre: Christian devotional literature

Ivan Ančić OFM (Croatian pronunciation: [ǐʋan âːnt͡ʃit͡ɕ]; 11 February 1624 – 24 July 1685) was a Croatian Franciscan priest and religious writer in the Catholic Revival tradition. Ančić, a native of Lipa in the region of Duvno, joined the Franciscan order in Bosnia and received an education in the Franciscan friaries in Ottoman Bosnia and Herzegovina and Italy. He served as a parish priest in his home province of Duvno and held various religious offices in several locations in Bosnia and Herzegovina. After arriving in Ancona, Italy, in 1674, he began publishing his religious works written in Shtokavian dialect of Illyrian, an older term for the language spoken in regions historically associated with Croatia. Ančić is the first Bosnian Franciscan to write in a commoners' language using the Latin alphabet.

== Early life ==
Ivan Ančić was born in Lipa in the Ottoman Herzegovina on 11 February 1624 to an affluent family of father Jure and mother Magdalena (Manda) née Sučić. Ančić was educated in the friaries of Bosnia in Rama, Fojnica and Velika. He joined the Franciscans in Rama in 1643 and was ordained to the priesthood in Velika in 1646. Afterwards, he went to study in Italy; at first, he studied philosophy in Cremona for three years and then theology in Bressanone from 1650, and from 1651 to 1653, in Naples.

On 20 October 1653, Sebastiano di Gaieta, the general commissioner of the Franciscan Order, appointed Ančić a procurator (financial administrator) for the money gained from the sale of the grain donated by King Philip IV of Spain to the Franciscan Province in Albania. In 1654, Ančić became the Order's preacher and, two years later, a lecturer.

== Ottoman Bosnia and Herzegovina ==
In 1656, Ančić asked di Gaieta's permission to return to his homeland. After getting the consent, Aničić served as a preacher, parish priest and lecturer in Velika, Našice, Brod, Belgrade (by the request of the Ragusan merchants there), Rama and Duvno (present-day Tomislavgrad). In 1662, he was sent by the provincial, the head of the Franciscan province, to Rome to receive absolutions and privileges from the Pope for the Bosnian Franciscans. While on the task, Ančić published Thesaurus perpetuus indulgentiarum seraphici ordinis sancti patris nostri Francisci ('The Perpetual Treasure of the Indulgences of the Seraphic Order of Our Holy Father Francis') that same year in Venice. The first part of the work contains the list of absolutions and privileges at the disposal of the Bosnian Franciscans, while the second part is composed of various blessings. From 1663 to 1669, Ančić was a parish priest in the Visoko and Rama friaries.

=== Duvno and Rama ===
At a chapter held in Kraljeva Sutjeska friary on 28 August 1669, he was elected the custos, a superior, of the Rama friary. During Bishop Marijan Lišnjić's pastoral visit, Ančić was mentioned as the only priest in the desolated large area of Duvno, which suffered due to the Cretan War. The historians Robert Jolić and Dominik Mandić hold that Ančić served as the guardian and the parish priest of Duvno simultaneously. Thanks to his good standing with the Muslim beys, the local lords, of Kongora of the Kopčić family, who were sympathetic towards Catholicism, Ančić managed to construct the parish house in 1670 and 1671. He took pastoral care of the faithful in Lipa and Kongora. Since the seat of the Diocese of Duvno was vacant, Ančić hoped to receive the episcopal appointment and received numerous recommendations. However, this put him at odds with Lišnjić, who, as the bishop of Makarska, administered the Diocese of Duvno. Thus, Lišnjić criticised him for constructing the parish house in Kongora. Even though Ančić was received by Pope Innocent XI twice in 1680, he failed to receive the episcopate. Between 1673 and 1674, Ančić was a preacher and a teacher of the Gregorian chant in Šibenik.

== Life in Italy and death ==
In 1674, Ančić travelled to Italy, where he began publishing his works. In Ancona, he published three works in Croatian: Vrata nebeska i Xivot viçchni ('The Gates of Heaven and Eternal Life') in 1678, Svitlost karstianska i slast duovna ('Christian Light and Spiritual Sweetness'), 1st volume and 2nd volume in 1679, and Ogledalo misniçko ('The Ministerial Mirror') in 1681. He died on 24 July 1685 in the Friary of St. Francis of Alto in Ancona.

Ančić offered the Congregation for the Propagation of the Faith twice in 1679 to appoint him as the bishop so he could administer the faithful in Bosnia and Herzegovina. A manuscript of his autobiography in 14 documents, which he sent to the Congregation, was also preserved. A Croatist, Alojzija Tvorić Kučko, suggests that it was written at the end of his life.

== Literary work ==
Ančić, renowned for his learning, was part of the Catholic Revival, a movement that emphasised the common language. He dedicated the last years of his life to advancing that cause. Ančić's works made a significant contribution to the religious education of the Catholic population under the Ottoman Empire. They were written to be easily understood by the readers. Unlike other Bosnian Franciscan writers of his time, who used the Bosnian Cyrillic, Ančić was the first to write in the Latin alphabet and published a table of Latin and Bosnian Cyrillic characters in his works. Trying to represent the sounds of the common language better, he combined the usage of Latin characters. Ančić's orthographic system influenced Marko Kuzmić, who, in the early 18th century, adapted Ančić's table by replacing its Cyrillic letters with Glagolitic ones—a medieval Slavic script still used in parts of Croatia at the time. Ančić's works were written in the Shtokavian Ikavian dialect, spoken by the commoners from the region of Duvno, where the dialect is still widely spoken by the Croat populace today. He referred to the speech as Duvnoan and Illyrian. All his works concern pastoral theology—the branch of theology that guides clergy in the spiritual care of their congregations. Following the Council of Trent (1545–1563), which sought to reform and renew the Catholic Church in response to the Reformation, pastoral theology placed particular emphasis on the clergy and laity leading godly, exemplary, and moral lives—a long-standing ideal that the Council reinforced and systematised.

Ančić began writing the two-volume Vrata nebeska i Xivot viçchni while in Assisi in 1676 and finished it in Loreto in early 1677. It was written in two volumes. The work can be divided into four parts, with the first book comprising three parts. In the first part, Ančić discusses the Scriptures and interpretations of the religious truths. The second part contains the review of Our Father, the Precepts of the Church, the life of Jesus and a thorough interpretation of the sacraments and spiritual gifts. It also discusses the ecclesiastical organisation, papal authority, absolution and alms, the meaning of preaching, and eschatology. The third part reviews the Hail Mary, the life of Jesus' mother, the purpose of the prayer, the mystery of the Trinity, and the life of Francis of Assisi. The final part comprises discussions about faith and a detailed interpretation of the Credo, absolution, penance, and eternal life. Here, Ančić relied on numerous Church Fathers and other religious writers, as well as the ancient Greek and Roman philosophers.

Svitlost karstianska i slast duovna has two volumes, all of which were completed by 1677. The first, comprising fourteen conversations, discusses the mysteries of Our Lady's Rosary and includes special prayers and instructions for priests to comfort and equip seriously ill patients and those nearing death, as well as condensed chapters of 'Vrata nebeska i Xivot viçchni'. The second chapter revolves around the mysteries of the liturgy.

Ogledalo misniçko is composed of 21 conversations written in the form of sermons. The conversations are mostly styled as a Baroque rhetoric, but have elements of classical rhetoric and are meditative and educational. They often start with a translated quote from Latin from the Bible or church teachers, followed by an example tied to the subject. Ančić proceeded with the exposition, proving statements one by one and concluding conversations with a summary and an instruction. Different conversations are intended for the clergy, friars, nuns, and the faithful. The work is oriented towards the everyday spiritual life of the clergy, and for the faithful to understand the life of the clergy better and influence the morals of both.
