= Pontifical Croatian College of St. Jerome =

- Papinski hrvatski zavod svetog Jeronima
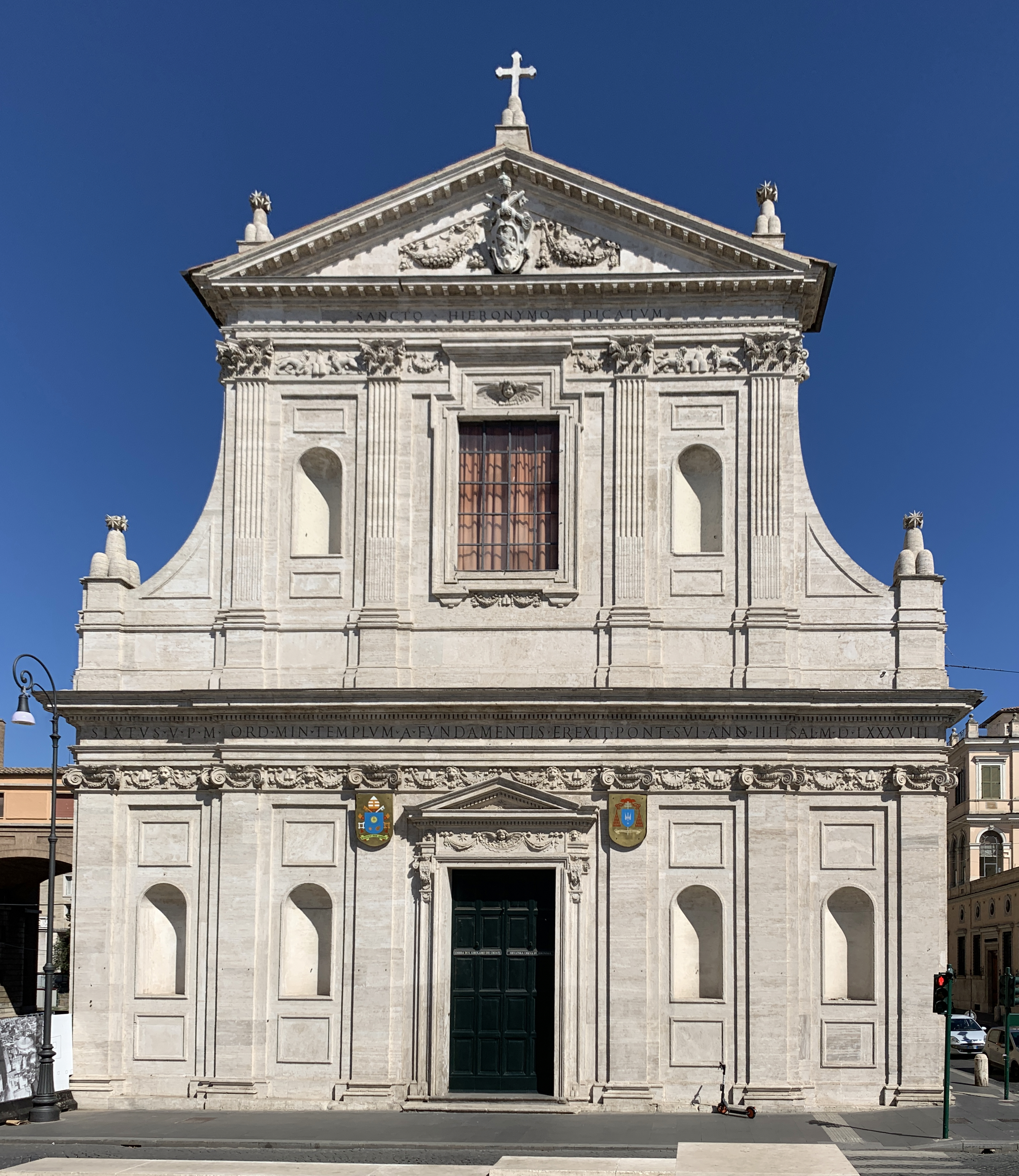
- Latin: Pontificium Collegium Croaticum Sancti Hieronymi
- Former names: Collegium Hieronymianum Illyricorum
- Type: Private
- Established: 1 August 1901
- Founders: Pope Leo XIII
- Religious affiliation: Catholic Church
- Rector: Marko Đurin
- Location: Rome, Italy
- Language: Croatian and Latin
- Website: www.sveti-jeronim.org

The Pontifical Croatian College of St. Jerome (Croatian: Papinski hrvatski zavod svetog Jeronima; Italian: Pontificio Collegio Croato Di San Girolamo a Roma; Latin: Pontificium Collegium Croaticum Sancti Hieronymi) is a Catholic college, church and a society in the city of Rome intended for the schooling of South Slav clerics. It is named after Saint Jerome. Since the founding of the modern college in 1901, it has schooled 311 clerics from all bishoprics of Croatia.

== History ==
In his apostolic letter, Piis fidelium votis, dated 21 March 1453, Pope Nicholas V granted the decrepit church of St. Marina the Martyr and its precincts to a brotherhood of "Ilyrian" (South Slav) priests on the Borgo San Pietro in Rome. At this location, next to the Mausoleum of Augustus on the left bank of the Tiber, they built a guest house and a hospital, and re-dedicated the institutions to Saint Jerome, a native of Dalmatia. The place became a refuge for Croatian refugees fleeing from the Ottomans in the 15th century. The brotherhood was renamed Congregatio or "Society of St. Jerome" in 1544, and Pope Paul III sanctioned its bylaws.

In 1582, the Society financed the publication of Aleksandar Komulović's work Nauch Charstianschiza Slovignschi narod, v vlaasti iazich ("Christian Doctrine for the Slavic People in Their Own Language").

In 1598, Pope Clement VIII gave permission for the hospice by the church to be transformed into a clerical college, but this did not actually happen until two centuries later, when, on 27 February 1790 Pope Pius VI opened a seminary for men who previously used the services of the St. Jerome Capitol. But even then, the seminary functioned only for brief periods without interruption: 1793–98, 1863–71, and finally 1884–1901, after which point the Chapter (of Canons) was abolished. According to historian Natko Nodilo, the Illyrian Academy in Rome was established to better prepare missionaries for the conversion of Eastern Orthodox Serbs.

In 1901, Pope Leo XIII issued the apostolic letter Slavorum gentem, renaming the Illyrian College of St. Jerome in Rome to Collegium Hieronymianum pro Croatica gente. This change sparked international diplomatic protests from several countries including Italy, Austria-Hungary, England, France, Russia, and significantly Montenegro, which objected on behalf of Serb Catholics from the Primate of Serbia (Primas Regni Serbiae), felt entitled to the institute, as they historically also held rights to the institute under its historic identity and long participation in its activities. Montenegro proposed the restoration of the old name or alternative formulations such as “pro Croatica et pro Serbica gente,” “et pro Serbica catholica gente primatialis sedis Serbiae,” “Collegium Hieronymianum pro gente croatica et catholicis Serbi Archidiocesis Antibarensis”, or later “pro catholicis Slavis meridionalibus." Montenegro, under Nicholas I, threatened to suspend diplomatic, security and revoke rights of the Catholic Church in Montenegro within its territory if the issue remained unresolved. In response, Vatican officials—including Cardinal Mariano Rampolla—consulted bishops from Bosnia, Zagreb, and Đakovo. Facing increasing diplomatic pressure and objections, the Holy See reversed the name change on 7 March 1902, restoring the original designation Illyricorum. At the time, the institute continued to be supported by Serbian Catholics.

At the end of the Second World War and in the immediate post-war period, the College was a prominent node in the "ratlines" used to extract Nazi and Ustaša members to Spain and South America. In February 1947, CIC Special Agent Robert Clayton Mudd reported ten members of Pavelić's Ustaša cabinet living either in San Girolamo or in the Vatican itself. Mudd had infiltrated an agent into the monastery and confirmed that it was "honeycombed with cells of Ustashe operatives" guarded by "armed youths". Mudd reported:

"It was further established that these Croats travel back and forth from the Vatican several times a week in a car with a chauffeur whose license plate bears the two initials CD, "Corpo Diplomatico". It issues forth from the Vatican and discharges its passengers inside the Monastery of San Geronimo. Subject to diplomatic immunity it is impossible to stop the car and discover who are its passengers."

In 1971, under Pope Paul IV, was renamed to "Croatian Institute of St. Jerome".

== Church of San Girolamo ==
Pope Pius V raised the Church of San Girolamo to the status of a Cardinal titular church, whose designee served as Cardinal-protector of the Society of St. Jerome. On 20 November 1570, Felice Cardinal Peretti of Montalto became Cardinal-protector, and retained this position until 24 March 1585 when he became Pope Sixtus V.

Sixtus V rebuilt the Church of Saint Jerome (finished 1589), to be used specifically for the people who spoke the Illyrian language, referring to Slavs from the eastern Adriatic, Dalmatia and Boka Kotorska. In the papal bull Sapientiam Sanctorum of 1 August 1589, he established the Capitol, a cathedral chapter of eleven Slavonic clerics who came to study in Rome. He named Aleksandar Komulović (1548–1608) from Split the first arch-priest. Between the Capitol's establishment and its abolition in 1901, more than 120 South Slav priests studied there.

The College was officially founded on 1 August 1901 by Pope Leo XIII. His apostolic letter, Slavorum gentem, called it Collegium Hieronymianum pro Croatica Gente ("Hieronymian College for the Croatian people"), but after diplomatic intervention from the Kingdom of Montenegro, on 7 March 1902, as well as intervention from several prominent aristocratic families of Dubrovnik who funded the College for centuries, both protesting because it schooled Catholic Serb clerics too, it was renamed to Collegium Hieronymianum Illyricorum (Illyrian Hieronymian College; San Girolamo degli Illirici in Italian).

Some Slav priests received scholarships from the society in 1907, and in 1911 several students enrolled at the college, but this again was interrupted in 1915 by the First World War. The College reopened after the war when Italy and the Kingdom of Serbs, Croats and Slovenes signed the Treaty of Rome (1924) and acknowledged the clerical institution under the breve Slavorum gentem. A rebuilding of the college's facilities ensued between 28 May 1938 and 10 December 1939, when six existing buildings were razed to make way for new ones. The college has functioned without interruption ever since. By a decree of Pope Paul VI, dated 22 July 1971, the college was renamed Pontificium Collegium Chroaticum Sancti Hieronymi (Pontifical Croatian College of St. Jerome).

Various precious works by Ivan Meštrović are kept in the College such as a copy of his Pietà, the bas-reliefs of St. Jerome and of SistoV (1942), the bust of Pius XII, the sketch for the bas-relief of the "Madonna mediatrix of all graces" as well as numerous letters.

After World War II, noted Croatian painter Jozo Kljaković was a political émigré and had an atelier there.

In November 2018, Croatian Parliament Speaker Gordan Jandroković visited the College. Jandroković said that the Pontifical Croatian College of St. Jerome had a great spiritual and cultural meaning for the entire Croatian people. In August 2019, Rector Bože Radoš was appointed bishop of Varaždin, Croatia.

In 2020, sculptor Margareta Krstić donated to the College, a nativity scene with figures dressed in typical Croatian folk costume.

== See also ==
- Croats of Italy
- Serbs of Italy
- Ratlines (World War II aftermath)
