= Boze (surname) =

Boze is a surname. Notable people with the surname include:

- Betsy Boze, American academic
- Calvin Boze (1916–1970), American trumpeter
- Joseph Boze (1746–1826), French artist
- Joseph Mattsson-Boze (1905–1989), American pastor
- Marshall Boze (born 1971), American baseball player
