= List of longest Croatian words =

List of longest Croatian words contains some of the longest words in Croatian. This list does not include words for large numbers.

One of the longer words in Croatian is prijestolonasljednica which means 'a female throne successor'.

== List ==
This list contains words in Croatian with at least 15 letters. Some of words in this list come from Latin and Greek.

Rank	Word	Letters	Explanation
1	prijestolonasljednikovičičinima	30	to those who belong to a (diminutive) wife of a throne successor
2	antisamoupravnosocijalistički	29	anti self-governing socialistic
3	ezofagogastroduodenoskopija	27	esophagogastroduodenoscopy, an endoscopic method used in suspected the existence of ulcer disease
4	najneindustrijaliziranija	25	the most unindustrialized
5	prijestolonasljednikovica	24	wife of throne successor (diminutive)
6	encefaliarteriografija	23	cerebral angiography, diagnostical method
7	encefalocisternografija	23	encephalo-cisternography, X-ray research of cistern area of the brain using the contrast agents
8	elektronistagmografija	22	electronystagmography, recording spontaneous flicker of eye movement
9	elektroencefalografija	22	electroencephalography, recording electrical activity of the brain
10	heilognatopalatoshiza	21	wikt:cheilognathopalatoschisis, congenital cleft lip, jaw and palate
11	elektrokardiografija	20	electrocardiography, recording electrical activity of the heart
12	deprofesionalizirati	20	separated from the professional control
13	lapalohisterektomija	20	operation of the uterus through an incision in the abdomen
14	otorinolaringologija	20	branch of medicine
15	prijestolonasljednica	20	throne successor (women)
16	prijestolonasljednik	19	throne successor
17	encefalomeningokela	19	
18	najnezainteresiraniji	19	the person who is the most uninterested in something
19	nekarakterističnost	19	not like something
20	automehatroničarka	18	female mechatronic
21	dermatofibrosarkom	18	skin tumor with clinical and histological features dermatofiboma and fibrosarcoma
22	medijastinoskopija	18	endoscopic procedure of examination and biopsy of the lymph nodes in the mediastinum
23	elektrostimulacija	18	electrostimulation
24	najzainteresaniji	17	the person who is the most interested for something
25	neprepoznatljivost	17	unrecognisability
26	prenezaposlenost	16	too big unemployment of people
27	makrovaskulatura	16	the collective name for the vessels and arteries with a diameter greater than 0.1 mm
28	epifenomenalizam	16	understanding of the importance of mental secondary product of physiological processes
29	brodogradilište	15	facility for buildings ships
30	kinematografija	15	all movies of one country
31	fundamentalizam	15	fundamentalism
32	elektroprivreda	15	industry dealing with the supply of electricity
33	farmakodinamika	15	pharmacodynamics
34	pluskvamperfekt	15	a grammatical tense,
35	kontinentalnost	15	characteristic of land without affecting the sea

== Literature ==
- Vladimir Anić, Ivo Goldstein: Rječnik stranih riječi, Zagreb, 2004. ISBN 953-6045-14-1
