= Diocese of Varaždin =

Roman Catholic diocese in Croatia

Coordinates: 46.3078°N 16.3387°E

Diocese of Varaždin Dioecesis Varasdinensis Varaždinska biskupija

Catholic
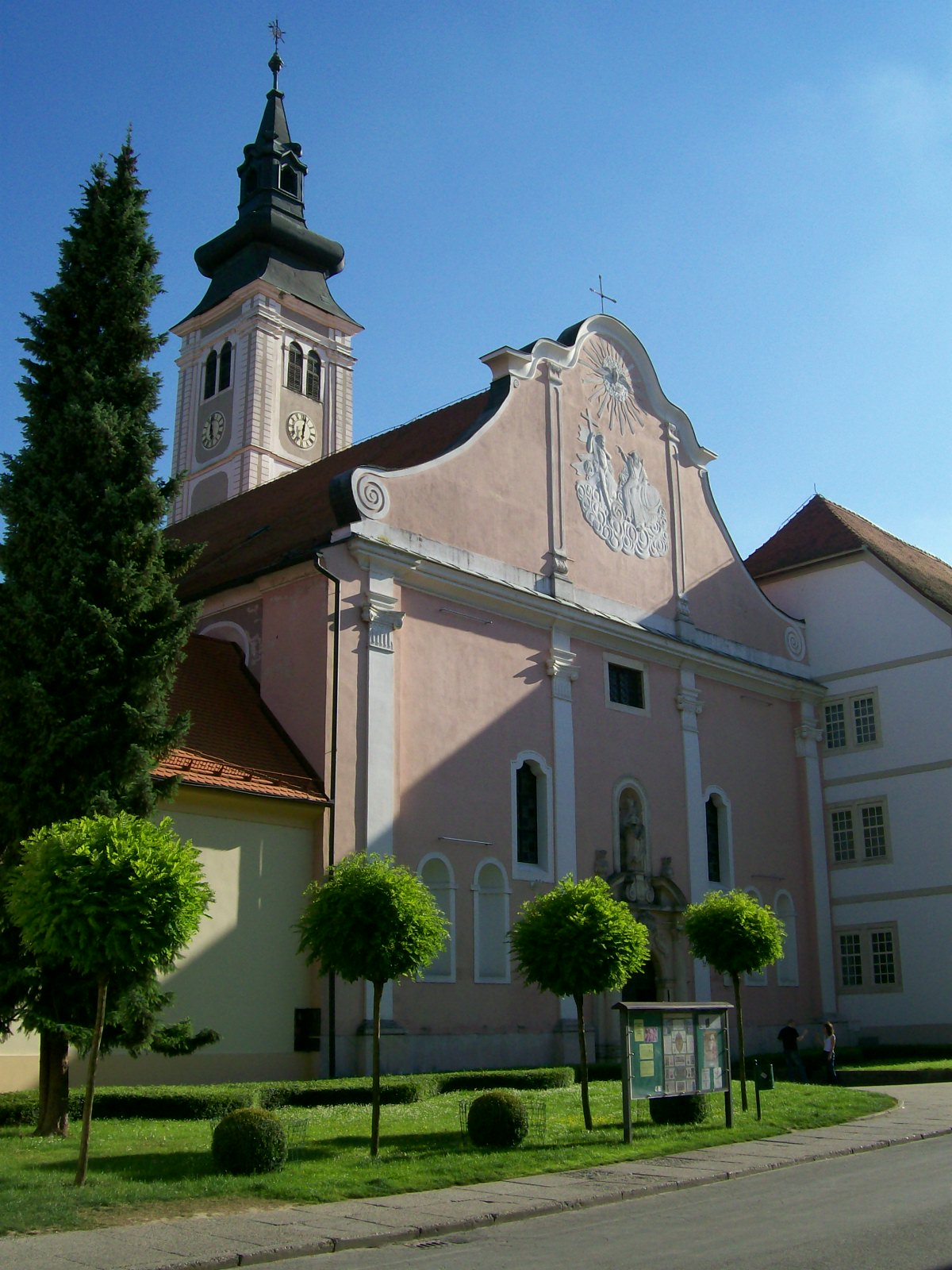
- Varaždin Cathedral

Location
- Country: Croatia
- Ecclesiastical province: Zagreb
- Metropolitan: Archdiocese of Zagreb

Statistics
- Area: 3,100 km^{2} (1,200 sq mi)
- Population: Total; Catholics: (as of 2014); 380,566; 362,247 (95.2%)

Information
- Denomination: Catholic
- Sui iuris church: Latin Church
- Rite: Roman Rite
- Established: 5 July 1997
- Cathedral: Cathedral of the Blessed Virgin Mary in Varaždin
- Patron saint: Saint Marko Krizin

Current leadership
- Pope: Leo XIV
- Bishop: Bože Radoš
- Metropolitan Archbishop: Dražen Kutleša
- Bishops emeritus: Josip Mrzljak

Map

Website
- biskupija-varazdinska.hr

The Diocese of Varaždin (Latin: Dioecesis Varasdinensis) is a Latin ecclesiastical territory or diocese of the Catholic Church in northern Croatia. The diocese is centred in the city of Varaždin. It is a new diocese, having only been erected on July 5, 1997, from the Archdiocese of Zagreb. Bishop Marko Culej was the first to be head of the diocese. Bishop Bože Radoš is the current bishop of Varaždin.

The Church of the Assumption of Mary into Heaven was built in 1646 and was proclaimed a cathedral on September 28, 1997.

The diocese's patron saint is Saint Marko of Križevci.

== Bishops ==
- Marko Culej (5 July 1997 – 19 August 2006)
- Josip Mrzljak (20 March 2007 – 1 August 2019)
- Bože Radoš (since 1 August 2019)

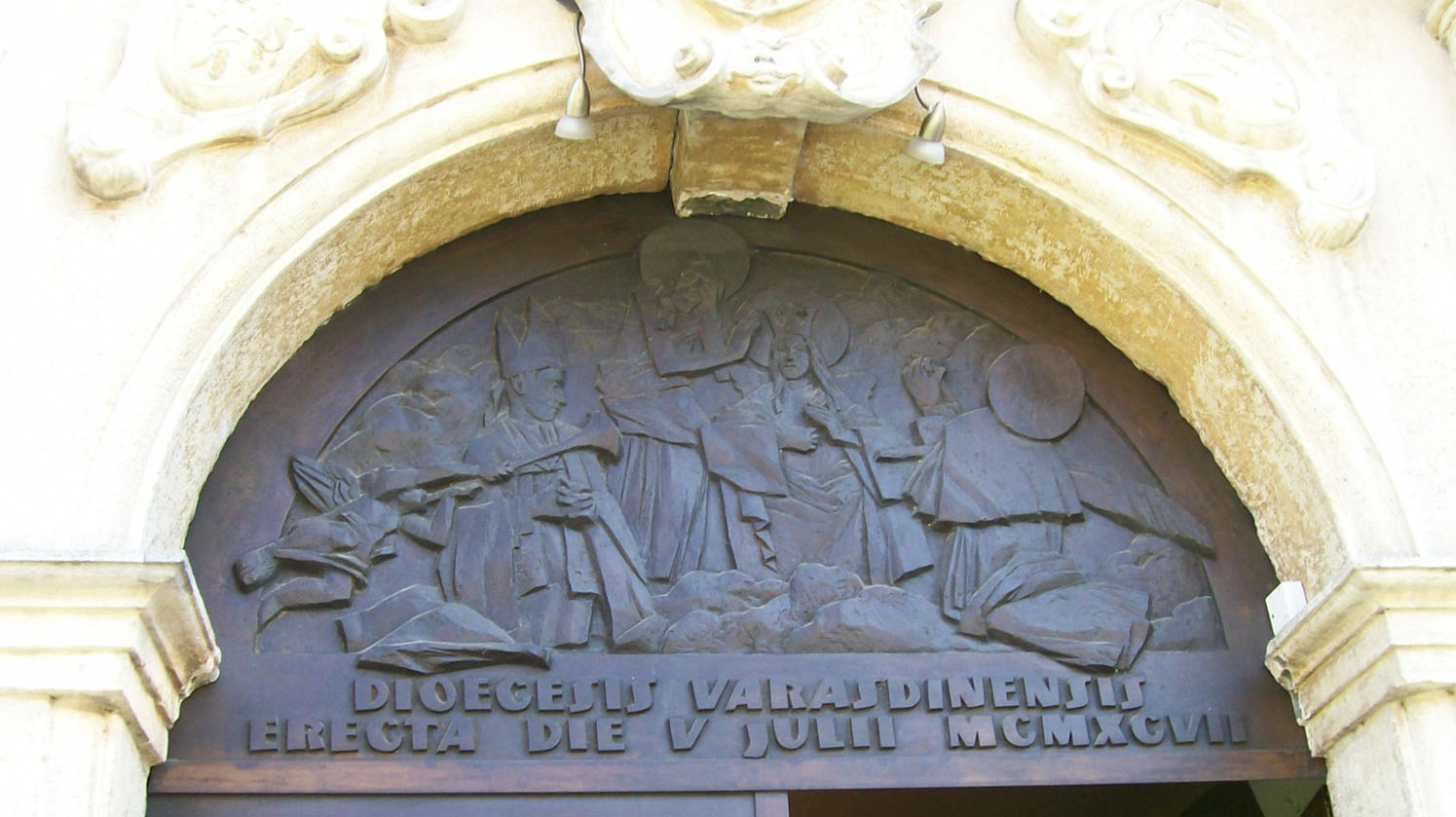
Latin inscription on the cathedral's door: Diocesis Varasdinensis erecta die V Julii MCMXCVII

== See also ==
- Varaždin
- Varaždin county
