= Aleksandar Komulović =

Dalmatian Catholic priest and diplomat

- Born: 1548; Split, Republic of Venice
- Died: 11 June 1608 (aged 59–60); Dubrovnik, Republic of Ragusa
- Other names: Lesandro Komulouich, Komulić, Comuleus, Comuli, Alessandro Schiavone, Alessandro Dalmata
- Occupations: Catholic priest, Papal diplomat, writer, linguist
- Known for: one of the earliest Pan-Slavists
- Movement: Counter-Reformation

Aleksandar Komulović (1548 – 11 June 1608) was a Catholic priest and diplomat from Venetian Dalmatia (now Croatia). Part of the Counter-Reformation, and an early Pan-Slavist, he notably led a diplomatic mission aimed to forge an anti-Ottoman coalition in support of the West during the Long Turkish War, principally in the Balkans and among the Slavs. Although he failed his mission, he inspired the Serbs to revolt. The Papacy was aware that the Latin language of the liturgical books presented an obstacle for the conversion of the South Slavs from Islam and Orthodoxy to Catholicism. Komulović belonged to the first group of Jesuit missionaries and authors who attempted to spread Catholicism among the Slavs using liturgical books in Slavic. After his death, his propaganda activities were continued by Bartol Kašić.

== Early life ==
Komulović was born into a patrician family which was referred to in Papal and Venetian documents as Comolis or Comulis in Split, in Venetian Dalmatia (today Croatia). He finished high school, probably in Italy. Komulović was familiar with the Church Slavonic language and the Glagolitic script. He was married with a woman from Dubrovnik.

== Society, school and church of Saint Jerome ==
In 1576 Komulović became a member of the Society of Saint Jerome in Rome. In 1579 he was excluded from the Society because he was accused of activities against the order. He was in the service of Cardinal Giulio Antonio Santorio and wrote a Slavic-language catechism, which he attempted to get printed in autumn 1579.

In 1582 he was again accepted into the Order of Saint Jerome because it was shown that the accusations against him were unjustified. In the same year the Society financed the publishing of Komulović's work Christian Doctrine for the Slavic People in Their Own Language ("Nauch Charstianschiza Slovignschi narod, v vlaasti iazich" or Italian: Dottrina Christiana per la nation Illirica nella propria lingua). This work established Komulović's reputation, especially among the Catholics of the Ottoman Empire. In 1584 Komulović was canon in Zadar, and in the same year, as an abbot in Nin, became a rector of the Academy of Saint Jerome, formerly known as St. Jerome of the Slavs (Italian: San Girolamo degli "Schiavoni") or the Illyrian Academy. He was appointed as the first arch-priest of the Church of Saint Jerome, completed in 1589.

== Secret Anti-Ottoman missions (1593–97) ==
At the end of January 1593 a bishop from Hvar sent a letter to the Pope inviting him to send envoys to Russia to forge a united Christian coalition against the Ottomans. In the same year a similar proposal was sent to the Pope by Komulović himself. An anonymous report from 1593, attributed to Komulović by many scholars, lists predominantly Slavic regions that could be mobilized to fight the Ottomans: Herzegovina, Slavonia, Croatia, Dalmatia, Serbia, Moesia, Bosnia, Rascia, Požega and Temeşvar.

In 1593–97 Komulović was a Papal diplomat engaged in forging a coalition of Slavs against the Ottoman Empire. This coalition was to include all Christian Slavs, including Orthodox Russia. Komulović believed that all Slavs are one nation who speak one language with different dialects. He also believed that Slavs should have only one religion, Catholicism. In 1594 Pope Clement VIII sent a secret diplomatic mission led by Komulović to forge a coalition against the Ottoman Empire. Komulović traveled via Venice, Trent, Innsbruck and Vienna to Alba Iulia. The purpose of this trip was to convince the Tsar of Russia, King of Poland (including Zaporozhian Cossacks), the Prince of Transylvania and Voivodes of Moldavia and Wallachia to join a western anti-Ottoman coalition. His aim was also to inspire Serbs to rise up against the Ottomans. According to some sources he continued his journey to Jakin, Hvar, Dubrovnik, Albania, Kosovo, Macedonia, Bulgaria and finally Moldavia.

Komulović was instructed to first travel to Venice to establish contacts with Albanians. In Venice he stayed in the house of notable Thomasso Pelessa from Albania; it was agreed upon that as soon as the Vatican, Poland or Russia declared war on the Ottomans, the Albanian tribes were to revolt. The Popes instructions and several letters Komulović had sewed in a cushion. When he left Venice he made tremendous mistake and forgot the cushion leaving behind three letters written in lingua Serviana by the "people of Albania". The Venetian authorities got in possession of those letters and concluded they were forged by Komulović, which is also believed by modern Australian historian Zdenko Zlatar.

In July 1594, an assembly was summoned in a monastery in Mat, by Albanian tribal chieftains, joined by some Venetian subjects, of whom Mark Gjin was elected their leader. In 1595 he visited Rome to receive the Pope's support.

In Pope Clement VIII's instructions to Komulović, the Serbs were explicitly praised as brave, while the neighbouring Bulgarians were said to be unwilling to fight. It is possible that these instructions were composed by Komulović himself. Komulović and Giovanni Battista from Cres maintained extensive contacts with the Patriarchate of Peć. Another member of Komulović's mission was Thommaso Raggio (1531–1599), who returned to Italy in 1595 while Komulović stayed in the Balkans until 1597 and submitted a detailed report to the Pope upon his return. He travelled to Moscow and twice visited the court of the Russian emperor, in 1595 and in 1597, but failed to convince the Muscovites to accept his proposals.

Komulović did not succeed in forming the anti-Ottoman coalition, as none of the countries accepted the Pope's invitation. Russia refused to participate using bad relation with Poland as justification. Still, the mission inspired a series of uprisings in Serb-populated territories, such as the Uprising in Banat and Uprising in Peć in 1594. In 1594 and 1595 Cossacks plundered Ottoman-held Moldavia and invaded Transylvania. The Himara Revolt broke out in Albania in 1596, but it was easily suppressed after the Venetians convinced some of the chieftains not to join the rebellion.

According to some rumours, the Republic of Ragusa was ready to expel Komulović because the Ottomans offered them some benefits if they did. Ragusans were worried because of the anti-Ottoman actions of Ragusan Jesuits. In 1597 Komulović began his return journey and stopped in Prague to propose to Emperor Rudolf II to re-capture Klis, which had a year earlier been briefly captured by the Uskoks.

== Career ==
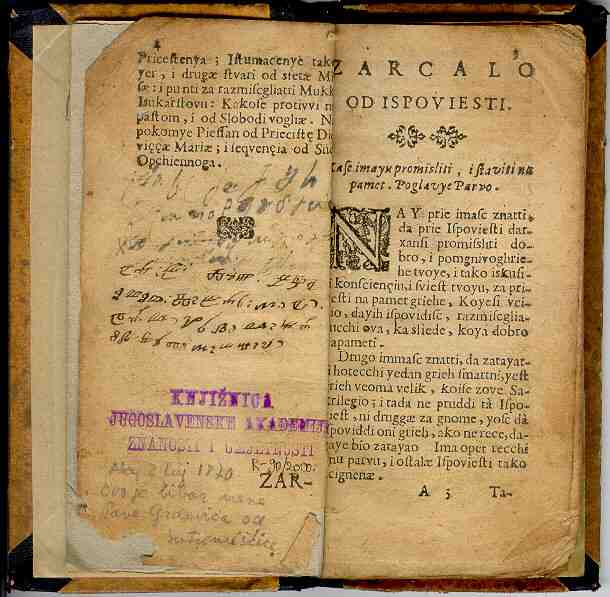
The first page of "Zrcalo od ispovijesti"

In 1603 Komulović published a translation of the Short Catechism written by Roberto Bellarmina in the South Slavic dialect of Čakavian (which however, was not suitable for Štokavian speakers, including those of Dubrovnik), the first of many translations he published. In period 1604–1608 Komulovic was a leader of the newly established jesuit society in Dubrovnik. The only allowance Komulović received in this period was modest income from the small abbey from Nin.

Before he died in Dubrovnik in 1608, Komulović wrote a will in Italian in which he left his money to the Illyrian Academy in Rome to buy a printing press for publishing books in Serbocroatian (lingua illirica). Jerolim Kavanjin praised Komulović for presenting Christian doctrine on Slavic language better than anyone prior.

After Komulović's death, the Jesuit mission he led was temporarily cancelled. His propaganda activities were continued by Bartol Kašić, who was an even greater Pan-Slav than Komulović. Kašić was a censor and editor of Komulovićs work Zrcalo od Ispovijesti, published in 1606 and republished in Rome in 1616 and in Venice in 1664 and 1704.

== Bibliography ==
Notable works of Aleksandar Komulović include:

- 1582 — Christian Doctrine for the Slavic People in Their Own Language ("Nauch Charstianschiza Slovignschi narod, v vlaasti iazich" or Italian: Dottrina Christiana per la nation Illirica nella propria lingua)
- 1603 — Translation of Short Catechism written by Roberto Bellarmina
- 1606 — Zrcalo od ispovjesti, published in Venice, republished in Venice in 1704

== Sources ==
- Golub, Ivan (1983). Juraj Križanić: sabrana građa o 300-obljetnici smrti (1683–1983) (in Croatian). Kršćanska sadašnjost.
- Ravlić, Jakša (1972). Zbornik proze XVI i XVII stoljeća (in Croatian). Matica hrvatska: "Zora,".
- Zlatar, Zdenko (1 January 1992). Our Kingdom Come: The Counter-Reformation, the Republic of Dubrovnik, and the Liberation of the Balkan Slavs. East European Monographs. ISBN 978-0-88033-239-2.
- Fine, John V. A. (5 February 2010). When Ethnicity Did Not Matter in the Balkans: A Study of Identity in Pre-Nationalist Croatia, Dalmatia, and Slavonia in the Medieval and Early-Modern Periods. University of Michigan Press. ISBN 978-0-472-02560-2.
