= Bože Radoš =

Croatian Roman Catholic prelate (born 1964)

- Bishop of Varaždin
- Church: Roman Catholic Church
- Appointed: 1 August 2019
- Predecessor: Josip Mrzljak
- Previous post: Rector of Pontifical Croatian College of St. Jerome (2016–2019)

Orders
- Ordination: 29 June 1990 (Priest) by Ćiril Kos
- Consecration: 24 November 2019 (Bishop) by Josip Bozanić

Personal details
- Born: Bože Radoš; 5 September 1964 (age 62) Crvenice, SR Bosnia and Herzegovina, SFR Yugoslavia
- Coat of arms

Bože Radoš (born 5 September 1964) is a Croatian prelate of the Roman Catholic Church who has been the bishop of Varaždin since 1 August 2019.

== Life ==
Bože Radoš was born near Tomislavgrad on 5 September 1964 into a Herzegovinian Croat Catholic family that moved a few years later to Kuševac in Croatia, where he grew up. After graduating from school and gymnasium in Đakovo and Zagreb, he entered the Major Theological Seminary in Đakovo in 1983, and, after completing his studies in philosophy and theology, on 29 June 1990 was ordained a priest for the archdiocese of Djakovo o Bosna i Srijem.

Radoš served as an assistant priest in Osijek from 1990 to 1991 and then continued his studies at the Pontifical Gregorian University in Rome, earning a licentiate in spiritual theology in 1997. Returning to Croatia, he served as a spiritual director at his alma mater, the Major Theological Seminary in Đakovo years from 1997 to 2016. His other assignments included: assistant for the ongoing formation of young priests from 1997 to 2016; lecturer in the Faculty of Theology from 1997 to 2016; and a member of the presbyteral council from 2013 to 2016. In 2010 Radoš became a canon of the Cathedral of St. Peter and St. Paul in Đakovo.

From to 2016 to 2019 he was rector of the Pontifical Croatian College of St. Jerome in Rome.

On 1 August 2019, Pope Francis appointed him bishop of Varaždin. On 24 November 2019, he received his episcopal consecration from Cardinal Josip Bozanić in the Cathedral of the Blessed Virgin Mary in Varaždin.

Catholic Church titles
Preceded by Jure Bogdan	Rector of the Pontifical Croatian College of St. Jerome; 2016–2019	Succeeded by Marko Đurin
Preceded by Josip Mrzljak	Bishop of Varaždin; 2019–present	Incumbent
