= Illyrian (South Slavic) =

Proto-Serbo-Croatian lects spoken in the Balkans

Illyrian and Slavic were the names of the Western South Slavic dialects, or, sometimes, of the South Slavic languages as a whole, commonly used throughout the Early Modern Period. It was used especially in the territories that were historically associated with Croatia during the modern era, until the 19th century.

The term was most widely used by speakers in Dalmatia, who used it to refer to their own language. It was used by both Catholic and Protestant writers. Some, such as Juraj Šižgorić writing in 1487, extended the term to South Slavic languages as a whole; his views are that "the people from Bohemia to the Adriatic and Black seas down to Epirus speak the same language, Illyrian." 16th-century prelate Antun Vrančić also used the term to embrace all South Slavs, and noted that the people of Belgrade (today in Serbia) spoke Illyrian – ″The local inhabitants who speak the Illyrian language call it Slavni Biograd, which means ‘renowned’ or ‘glorious,’ because of the bravery of its soldiers and officers who after the fall of Smederevo and the Serbian state were able to hold out so long in its defense" – while also applying the term to the language of "Thracians" and "Bulgarians". Writing in 1592, bishop Peter Cedolini applied the term even more widely: he believed all the Slavs had a single common language, which he called Illyrian. Some used the term "Slavic" when writing in proto-Serbo-Croatian and "Illyrian" as a synonym when writing in Romance languages.

Various 16th-century travellers in Dalmatia reported that local church services were not carried out in Latin but Illyrian. In general, no clear distinction was made between the vernacular language and Church Slavonic – names such as Illyrian, Slavonic, Slavic, Croatian, and Dalmatian were applied to both lects without distinction.

Jesuit Bartol Kašić, as part of his missionary work, sought to find a common South Slavic language that would be understandable to all. He initially turned to a form of Chakavian, which he named Illyrian; later he switched to Shtokavian, which he instead called Slavic (slovinski), having already used the name Illyrian with a different signification. In 1604 Institutionum linguae illyricae libri duo (the structure of the Illyrian language in two books; 200 pages) was published in Rome. This grammar was used as a textbook by Jesuits who had been sent on a mission in the Balkans. Bartol Kašić adopted the South Slavic dialect of grammar in Shtokavian, singling out the subdialect of Dubrovnik that was his vernacular.

As a national term, "Illyrian" had no fixed meaning; sometimes it was applied to Slavs as a whole, sometimes South Slavs as a whole, sometimes only Catholic South Slavs, while occasionally (particularly among certain Habsburg officials) it was specifically applied to the Orthodox Serbs. A notion of pan-Slavic "Illyrian" national identity, often with "Illyrian" as its language, remained strong among intellectuals in Croatia from the fifteenth to the nineteenth century, eventually culminating in the pan-South Slavic Illyrian movement of the 1800s. Many saw themselves as part of a narrow Croat community within a much broader Illyrian nation.

== See also ==
- Kingdom of the Slavs
- Juraj Križanić
- Ivan Ančić
