= Dubrovnik dialect =

Neo-Shtokavian dialect of Dubrovnik

- dubrovački dijalekt
- Language family: Indo-European: Balto-Slavic; Slavic; South Slavic; Western South Slavic; Shtokavian; Neo-Shtokavian; Dubrovnik dialect

Language codes
- ISO 639-3: –
- Glottolog: None
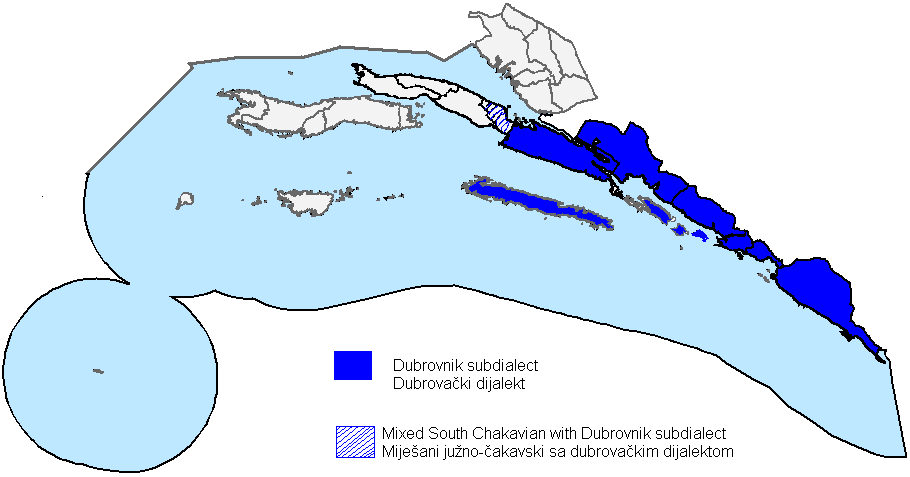
- Area of the Dubrovnik dialect

The Dubrovnik dialect (Serbo-Croatian: dubrovački dijalekt) is a Neo-Shtokavian dialect or subdialect spoken in Dubrovnik and the littoral of the former Republic of Ragusa, from the eastern part of the Pelješac peninsula (around Janjina) to the Croatian border with Montenegro, and on the island of Mljet.

The Dubrovnik dialect is the least widespread of the Shtokavian dialects in Croatia. It has an Ijekavian reflex, with a sporadic presence of ikavisms. While the Dubrovnik dialect shares the Neo-Shtokavian base with the Eastern Herzegovinian, it displays some transitional features, including lexical and phonetic similarities with nearby Chakavian dialects and remnants of older ikavisms.

Although Neo-Shtokavisation gave similar results in Dubrovnik and East Herzegovina, the dialects developed from different local bases, and the Ijekavian reflex in Dubrovnik developed independently. While traditionally considered a distinct local idiom, the Dubrovnik dialect is often linguistically considered part of the Eastern Herzegovinan dialect. Nonetheless, it has preserved some specific traits in accentuation and morphology.

A significant portion of loanwords comes from Italian, primarily the Florentine dialect, as well as from Venetian and the extinct Dalmatian language. A smaller portion of loanwords are derived from Greek and Ottoman Turkish. The lexicon also shows similarities with nearby Chakavian dialects.

During the time of the Republic of Ragusa, the Dubrovnik dialect was called the Ragusan language ("dubrovački jezik") by both native speakers and foreigners, as in Euridiče, tradžikomedija Paše Primovića Latiničića Dubrovčanina, prinesena po njemu u jezik dubrovački iz jezika latinskoga (Ragusan author, 1617), and Vanghielia i pistule istomaccene s Missala novvoga rimskoga u iesik dubrovacki sa grada i darxave dubrovacke (Bartol Kašić, Croatian author, 1638).

== See also ==
- Younger Ikavian dialect
