= Alfons de Requesens =

Spanish prelate

The Most Reverend Alfons de Requesens OFM
- Bishop of Barbastro
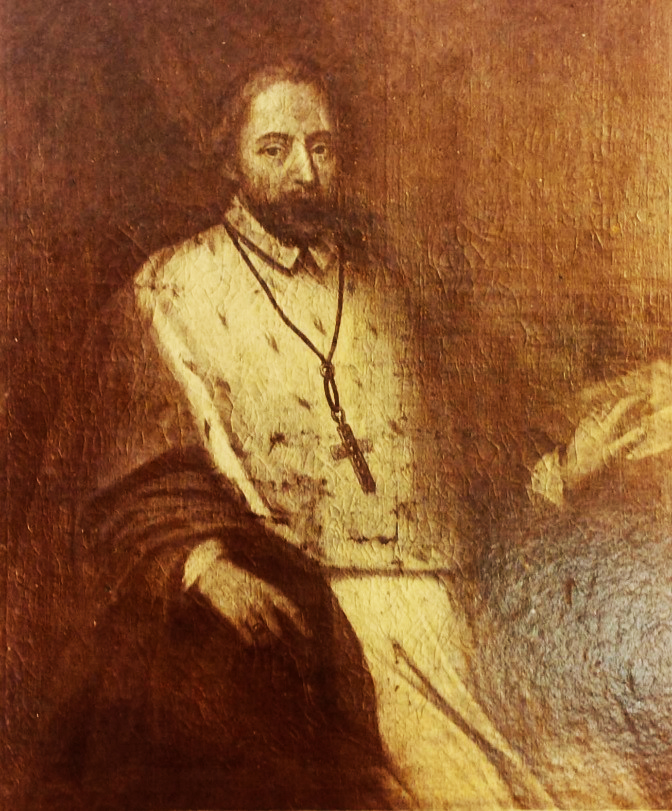
- Portrait of Alfons de Requesens
- Church: Catholic Church
- Diocese: Barbastro
- Appointed: 6 October 1625
- Predecessor: Pedro Apaolaza Ramírez
- Successor: Bernardo Lacabra

Orders
- Consecration: by Franz von Dietrichstein

Personal details
- Born: 1570 Antwerp, Barbant, Holy Roman Empire or Cervera, Catalonia, Aragon
- Died: 8 April 1639 (aged 68–69) Zaragoza, Kingdom of Aragon, Aragon
- Denomination: Catholic
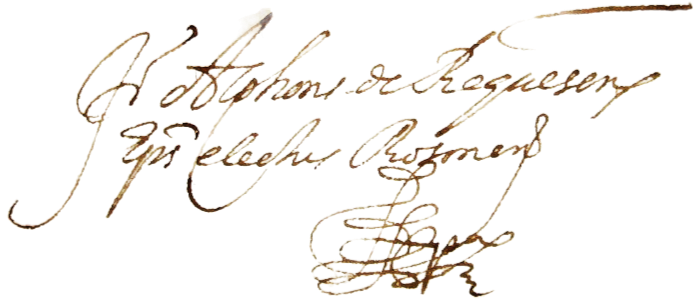
- Signature

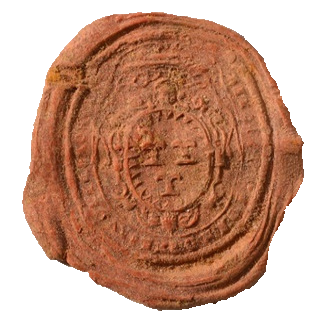
- Coat of arms

Alfons de Requesens y Fenollet OFM (1570 – 8 April 1639) was a Spanish prelate of the Catholic Church who served as the bishop of Barbastro from 1627 to 1639. Holding the titular title of bishop of Duvno from 1610 to 1627, de Requesens served as an auxiliary bishop of Olomouc from 1610 to 1621 and Toledo from 1621 to 1627. Before his service in Toledo, de Requesens held several duties in Franciscan provinces in Germany and Austria. He also served as a diplomat for Emperor Ferdinand II.

== Origin ==
Little is known about de Requesens' origin. He was born either in Antwerp in present-day Belgium or Cervera in present-day Spain. His mother was Catalina Fenollet (d. 1625). Pascal Hollaus suggests she was a noble family member from Fenouillet, Pyrénées-Orientales. His father's surname, de Requesens, indicates he belonged to the Catalan nobility. The de Requesens family produced several notable figures in Catalonia during the 15th and 16th centuries, and their loyalty to the Spanish royalty allowed them to bear the crown on their family coat of arms. De Requesens mentions in a letter that his brother Luis died in 1625 and left four orphans.

== Franciscan Order ==
De Requesens was at first a member of the Low German Franciscan Province, which had friaries in present-day Netherlands, Belgium and northern Germany. He was a member of the friary in Antwerp, where he was known as a good preacher. Later, de Requesens transferred to the Franciscan Province of Cologne, where, on 16 September 1603, he was appointed definitor and guardian of the friary in Cologne. During his short tenure, he finished the construction of the friary church.

The reason why de Requesens changed provinces is unclear. Hollaus suggests that either his friary in Antwerpen was demolished during the region's religious turmoil at the time or, more likely, that he wanted to fund the friaries of the Recollects he supported, which caused a conflict in his home province. De Requesens and the other two friars supported the latter, trying to force the reform of the friary in Cologne. After his failure to reform the friary, de Requesens went to Vienna with his like-minded friar Ägidius Smurit and asked Emperor Rudolf II to assign him to a reformed friary. In December 1603, he reported to the provincial of the Franciscan Province of Tyrol in Prague that he was about to find a friary. He succeeded and was appointed the guardian of the Our Lady of Snows friary in Prague.

At the same time, on 12 December 1603, de Requesens was appointed the general commissioner for Upper Germany, Austria, Bohemia, Hungary, Poland and Croatia by the Franciscan Curia. His duty was to support the Franciscan province, make visits, and preside over chapters as the Franciscan general's representative. Eight days later, he expressed interest in visiting the Tyrolean province and likely visited the friary in Innsbruck later. Because of his office, he travelled widely and made important decisions. He served as the military vicar of the Austrian Imperial Army.

In November 1609, he permitted Father Antonius Remerarius to leave Vienna following complaints and an edict from Archduke Matthias. Participating in the 1606 General Chapter in Toledo, he encountered disagreement with Father Franziskus Rensinck over the Cologne friary. On his return from Spain, he visited the Clarisses and Franciscan friary in Freiburg im Breisgau.

That same year, he led several provincial chapters, including those in Bohemia and Graz, where he was unexpectedly elected provincial for three years on October 3. During his provincial tenure, he founded the Confraternity of the Immaculate Conception and issued a clergy study order. He also served as an advisor to Emperors Rudolf II and Matthias.

In 1609, during the Order's assembly in Madrid, de Requesens intended to resign as the general commissioner. Testimonials from Tyrolean Provincial Bernard Rast praised his observant adherence to rules, discipline, and religious zeal and described his lifestyle as saintly. He was allowed to resign on the condition that he lead chapters in the Upper German and Tyrolean Provinces, though he couldn't attend the latter in 1610 because he received episcopal honours.

== Episcopate ==
For his services, he was awarded the nomination as the titular bishop of Duvno by Emperor Mathias, and received papal confirmation on 30 August 1610. He succeeded György Zalatnaky, who was only nominated to the office but was never installed. De Requesens was consecrated by Cardinal Franz von Dietrichstein in Vienna. He was allowed not to reside in his diocese because of the Ottoman occupation, and received 500 guilders from the Archdiocese of Eger, also under the Ottoman occupation. Since he was only a titular bishop, de Requesens resided in the Franciscan friary of St. Jerome in Vienna and served as an auxiliary bishop in the Archdiocese of Olomouc under Cardinal von Dietrichstein. Since de Requesens wasn't a residential bishop in Duvno, the diocese was administered by the bishops of Bosnia who were granted a general jurisdiction over the diocese by the Holy See. From 1615, they entrusted the administration to Bartul Kačić, the bishop of Makarska.

In this office in 1613, he consecrated the castle chapel in Frohsdorf and the altars in the Church of St. Blaise in Klein-Wien (present-day Paudorf and Furth bei Göttweig). The church of St. Blaise still has a reliquary with a seal from de Requesens as a certificate of authenticity. In 1618, he also consecrated several altars for the Göttweig Abbey in the churches of St. Philipp and Jakobus in Brunnkirchen, St. John in Hellerhof and St. Wolfgang in Fürth.

In 1621, de Requesens was sent by Emperor Ferdinand II to the court of Philip IV of Spain as an extraordinary emissary. Since that year, he served as an auxiliary bishop in the Archdiocese of Toledo. He was probably commissioned by Philip III of Spain to support his son Ferdinand, who had become cardinal and archbishop of Toledo on 1 March 1620 at the age of ten.

On 11 August 1625, he was nominated the bishop of Barbastro, and received papal confirmation on 6 October. During his term of office, he gave, among other things, the Diocesan constitutions and had a new organ built in the Barbastro cathedral. On 18 January 1639, he was nominated the bishop of Vic. However, he died before receiving confirmation on 8 April 1639 in Zaragoza. His confirmation, which was issued on 2 May, remained without effect. He is buried in Barbastro.

== Footnotes ==
Catholic Church titles
Preceded by Daniel Vocatius	Bishop of Duvno; 1610–1625	Succeeded by Vincenzo Zucconi
Preceded by Pedro Apaolaza Ramírez	Bishop of Barbastro; 1625–1639	Succeeded by Bernardo Lacabra
