= Pavao Posilović =

Catholic bishop

The Most Reverend Pavao Posilović OFM
- Bishop of Duvno
- Church: Catholic Church
- Diocese: Duvno
- Appointed: 24 May 1655
- Term ended: c. 1656/57
- Predecessor: Marijan Maravić
- Successor: Pavao Dragičević
- Other post: Bishop of Skradin (1642–55)

Personal details
- Born: c. 1597 Glamoč, Bosnia, Ottoman Empire
- Died: c. 1656/57 Location disputed
- Denomination: Catholic

Pavao Posilović OFM (c. 1597 – c. 1656/57) was a Bosnian-Herzegovinian and Croatian prelate of the Catholic Church who served as the bishop of Duvno from 1655 to his death in 1658. Previously, he served as the bishop of Skradin from 1642 to 1655 and from 1644, he was entrusted with the pastoral care of the Catholics in several dioceses under the Ottoman rule.

== Early life ==
Posilović was born in Glamoč in Ottoman Bosnia and Herzegovina to father Ilija and mother Ana. Dominik Mandić writes that he probably joined the Franciscans in the Visovac friary, where, after education and a novitiate he celebrated his first mass. Around 1620, he was sent to Italy for further education, where he studied philosophy and theology at the Franciscan General College in Perugia, Ancona and other Italian cities. After becoming a general theology lecturer, he returned to his home country and became a theology teacher in some of the Bosnian friaries.

On 20 1634, the chapter of the Franciscan Province of Bosnia decided to ask the Congregation to propose Posilović as the bishop of Skradin after it became vacant after the death of its bishop Toma Ivković. Before that, Posilović never held any offices within the Province. After the chapter was concluded, Posilović went to Rome for the episcopal nomination. However, the Congregation had already decided to propose Jeronim Lučić as the bishop of Skradin and to grant the wishes of the Bosnian Province; on 21 November 1634, it suggested to Bartul Kačić, the bishop of Makarska, to take Posilović as his bishop coadjutor with the right of succession. However, as Mandić states, Kačić wanted to secure the office for his nephew, Petar Kačić, whom he proposed as his bishop coadjutor ten years later. Thus, he didn't comply with the Congregation's suggestion.

Lučić's appointment didn't go as smoothly as planned, as the Bosnian Province opposed it. The Congregation then planned to appoint Lučić as the bishop of Drivast to save the see of Skardin for Posilović. However, Lučić suggested he should be appointed the bishop of Duvno instead of Drivast. Nevertheless, on 21 November 1634, the Congregation decided to propose Lučić as bishop of Drivast. The proposal was made on a secret consistory held on 3 March 1636, while on 23 September 1636, the Congregation proposed him as the administrator of Skradin and apostolic vicar of Bosnia.

The Bosnian Province and Rome still considered Posilović a bishop-designate for Skradin. Meanwhile, Posilović continued to teach and write his work Nalađenje duhovno (Spiritual delight). In October and November 1637, Posilović was in Venice, where he prepared to publish his work, which was finalised in 1639. While in Venice, Posilović wrote to the Congregation secretary on 24 October 1637, asking to be promoted to bishop and to avoid leaving him in uncertainty. However, a new obstacle arose to his appointment. Ivan Tomko Maravić, the bishop of Bosnia, managed to promote his nephew Toma Maravić, first as the bishop of Smederevo in 1614, and later, after his death, the bishop of Bosnia. In 1638, Toma Marvić asked for confirmation of his appointment as the bishop of Bosnia and was officially translated on 3 October 1639.

In 1640, Toma Maravić suffered a stroke, which left him incapacitated. Nearby bishops could not step in for him; Bartul Kačić of Makarska suffered from gout, while Lučić of Drivast was old. Thus, the Bosnian Province and Rome began preparing for Posilović's appointment. The provincial Martin Nikolić informed the Congregation that the Province would financially sustain the new bishop, while Lučić wrote to them on 14 August 1641, informing them that he would be glad if Posilović were appointed bishop because, due to the distance, harsh terrain and his old age, he would be unable to care for the Catholics of Ottoman Bosnia and Herzegovina.

== Bishop of Skradin ==
The Congregation decided on 14 February 1642 to propose Posilović as the bishop of Skradin. Pope Urban VIII confirmed this proposal on 24 February and ordered his promotion. Posilović was officially promoted as the bishop of Skradin at a secret consistory held on 16 June 1642. By then, the Catholics in the diocese had almost disappeared because of Ottoman incursions. He was consecrated in the Roman church of San Silvestro in Capite by Cardinal Giovanni Battista Pallotta on 7 September 1642. In 1643, in Fojnica, he was ordered by the Congregation to settle an issue within the Bosnian Province.

On 11 May 1644, the Congregation entrusted him the pastoral care over the Catholics of the dioceses of Makarska, Duvno, Krbava, Zadar, Nin, Trogir, Zagreb and the Archdiocese of Split who found themselves under the Ottoman rule. The remaining Catholics in the Diocese of Skradin were under the care of the Franciscans of the Visovac friary.

Posilović moved to the Rama friary in the Diocese of Duvno. On several occasions, the bishop of Bosnia and administrator of Duvno Marijan Maravić tried to remove him from the friary. To resolve his residential issues, Posilović travelled to Rome in the summer of 1645 but was unable to return due to the outbreak of the Cretan War between the Venetians and the Ottomans. He apologised to the Congregation several times for this. During the war, the Venetians plundered the Diocese of Skradin and demolished the Skradin cathedral, thus factually ending its existence. Posilović remained in Rome until 15 October 1646, when the Congregation, with the approval of the pope, ordered him to return to Illyria (the territory of the Southern Slavs) for the promotion of the Catholic faith. While staying in Rome, Posilović translated Fiore di virtù into Croatian language under the title Cvijet od kriposti duhovni i tilesnije prikoristan svakomu virnomu krsjaninu, koji ga šti često.

The Franciscans in Slavonia, led by the bishop of Smederevo, Marin Ibrišimović rejected Maravić. At the same time, he and Ibrišimović disputed over the revenues of the Slavonian parishes. To save the Catholic populace from these disputes, the Congregation decided to form an interim apostolic vicariate for the territory between the rivers Sava and Drava. The vicariate was assigned to Posilović on 11 March 1648 and existed until 1650. After Ibrišimović died in 1650, Maravić, with the intercession of Viennese imperial circles, regained the Slavonian parishes. Since Posilović administered them as the apostolic vicar, Maravić offered him the Diocese of Duvno in exchange. Under this agreement, the Congregation decided on 28 November 1650 that Posilović could reside in the Rama friary, receive annual support of 100 scudos, and perform rites only with permission from the local ordinary. However, at the end of the year, Maravić broke the agreement and requested Posilović's removal from the Rama friary and a ban on performing episcopal duties. After meeting with Posilović in the Rama friary on 12 October 1651, Maravić complained to the Congregation that Posilović was rebelling against the Franciscans. However, he agreed that he could remain in the friary without performing episcopal duties.

== Bishop of Duvno ==
Posilović was supported by the Bosnian Province, which addressed the Congregation in his favour on 6 July 1652. The clergy of the Diocese of Duvno and the faithful pleaded with the Congregation on 12 November 1652 to appoint Posilović as their bishop. The Congregation did so on 14 April 1654 and proposed Posilović to the Pope as the bishop of Duvno. On 24 May 1655, Pope Alexander VII transferred him from Skradin to Duvno, while he retained administration of the Diocese of Skradin. On 26 February 1657, the Congregation discussed Posilović's succession, so Mandić concluded that he died during 1567 or in the early days of 1657.

According to some testimonies, which Mandić dated to the period of Marijan Lišnjić and Nikola Bijanković, the bishops of Makarska who administered the Diocese of Duvno, the Franciscans of Rama expelled Posilović from the friary. However, Mandić rejects this possibility, arguing that the Ottomans, specifically the governor of the Bosnia Eyalet, banished Posilović from the friary. Škegro states that there is a possibility that Posilović was murdered by the same Ottomans who murdered several Franciscans from Rama in 1653 when the friary was plundered. This was testified by Bono Benić, a Franciscan, in his chronicle. The location of Posilović's death is disputed. Miroslav Džaja wrote that he was taken from Rama to a dungeon in Livno, where he died. At the time, the bey of Livno ruled Rama. Džaja bases his claim on the tomb of an anonymous prelate honoured by the Livno Catholics and Muslims. Today, the location is known as Biskupov Grob (the Bishop's grave) near the old town mosque in the Bistrica quarter.

== Footnotes ==
Catholic Church titles
Preceded by Toma Ivković	Bishop of Skradin; 1642–1655	Succeeded by Nikola Bijanković
Preceded by Marijan Maravić	Bishop of Duvno; 1655–1657	Succeeded by Michael Jahnn
