= Vid Hvaranin =

15th-century Catholic bishop of Duvno

- Bishop of Duvno
- Church: Catholic Church
- Province: Split
- Diocese: Duvno
- Appointed: 2 October 1489
- In office: 1489–before 26 June 1507
- Predecessor: Nikola Cimelić
- Successor: Tomás de Córdoba
- Other post: Vicar general of the Archdiocese of Split (c. 1490–1495)
- Previous posts: Canon of Hvar; vicar general of the Bishop of Hvar (attested 1482)

Orders
- Consecration: 13 June 1490 by Antonio Saracco
- Rank: Bishop

Personal details
- Died: After 1495 and before 26 June 1507
- Denomination: Catholic
- Residence: Split, Republic of Venice (1490–1495)

Vid Hvaranin (Latin: Vitus de Ruschis; died after 1495 and before 26 June 1507) was a Croatian prelate of the Catholic Church who served as the bishop of Duvno from 1489 until his death. Originally a nobleman and canon from Hvar, he was appointed by Pope Innocent VIII on 2 October 1489, after the Ottomans occupied the diocese's territory. He was consecrated in Venice on 13 June 1490.

During his episcopate, Vid resided in Split, where he served as a vicar general of Bartolomeo Averoldi, the Archbishop of Split. He also used the title of bishop of Duvno and all the land of Hum. Historians have disputed whether he personally administered his diocese under Ottoman rule or exercised his authority through local vicars. He was last documented in 1495, and his exact date of death remains unknown.

== Origins and appointment ==
Vid belonged to a noble family from Hvar and was a canon of its cathedral chapter. On 21 June 1482, he served as vicar general to Lovro, bishop of the Hvar. According to the historian Dominik Mandić, when Jeronim Dieda succeeded Lovro in 1486, Vid apparently ceased serving as vicar general and continued as a canon.

On 2 October 1489, Pope Innocent VIII appointed Vid as the bishop of Duvno, succeeding Nikola Cimelić, who had died outside the Roman Curia. The appointment bull identifies Vid as a canon of Hvar of noble origin and describes the Diocese of Duvno as occupied by non-Christians. Because of the difficult conditions, the Pope allowed him to receive episcopal consecration from any Catholic bishop, assisted by two or three other bishops, after making the required profession of obedience to the Holy See.

On 13 June 1490, Vid was consecrated bishop in Venice by Antonio Saracco, titular Archbishop of Corinth, assisted by Archbishop Bartolomeo Averoldi of Split and Bishop Nicolaus de Monte.

== Episcopal activities in Split ==
From approximately 1490 to 1495, Vid resided in Split and served as a representative and vicar general of Archbishop Averoldi. The appointment allowed him to exercise delegated episcopal authority within the Archdiocese of Split, even though he remained the bishop of Duvno. The historian Ante Škegro, following Slavko Kovačić, considered Vid one of the auxiliary bishops who assisted the archbishops of Split while holding episcopal titles to neighbouring dioceses.

In 1493, as the Archbishop's vicar general, Vid issued a judgment concerning the right to elect the parish priest of the Church of St. Stephen outside the walls of Knin. The dispute concerned the municipal authorities' rights and their participation in appointing the parish priest.

Vid's activities in Split took place during a dispute between Archbishop Averoldi and members of the cathedral chapter. Averoldi also employed Jerolim Cipik as vicar general, but their relationship deteriorated, and Cipik was subsequently removed from office. Mandić suggested that Vid may also have lost the Archbishop's confidence because he sided with the cathedral clergy. Vid disappears from the surviving archdiocesan records after 1495, while another vicar general, Jerolim Makarelić, appears in 1496. However, Vid's dismissal has not been documented.

== Jurisdiction in Duvno and Hum ==
In documents from 1491 and 1495, Vid used a title identifying him as the bishop of Duvno and all the land of Hum (episcopus Dumnensis, ac totius terrae Cumnensis). Mandić interpreted the title as indicating ecclesiastical authority extending from the Cetina River in the west to Popovo Polje in the east. According to the Franciscan historian Karlo Jurišić, Vid also administered the Diocese of Makarska and the parts of the Diocese of Ston under Ottoman control. These interpretations do not establish how extensively Vid exercised jurisdiction within those territories.

Mandić maintained that Vid obtained freedom for Catholics to practise their religion within the Diocese of Duvno and personally ministered among its population. Škegro disputed this interpretation, noting Vid's documented residence and activities in Split from 1490 to 1495. Jurišić likewise considered it unlikely that Vid could have resided in the Ottoman-held territories and suggested that he administered the dioceses through vicars drawn from the Franciscan communities of Bosnia Srebrena.

== Later life and succession ==
Vid is not securely documented after 1495. The ecclesiastical historian Daniele Farlati concluded from his disappearance from the records that he had probably died around 1496. Mandić rejected this conclusion and suggested that the lack of later references resulted from Vid's loss of favour with Archbishop Averoldi during the dispute with the Split cathedral chapter. Neither interpretation establishes when Vid died.

Vid had died by 26 June 1507, when Pope Julius II appointed Tomás de Córdoba as the bishop of Duvno. The bull expressly states that the see was vacant following Vid's death outside the Roman Curia. The papal record is reproduced by Mandić, although the episcopal register Catholic-Hierarchy gives 26 January 1507 as the date of Tomás's appointment.

Vid was the last bishop of Duvno from the region before the appointment of Daniel Vocatius in 1551. Škegro considered the intervening bishops to have been titular holders of the see, with no evidence that they exercised effective jurisdiction within the Ottoman-held diocese.

== Footnotes ==
Catholic Church titles
Preceded by Nikola Cimelić	Bishop of Duvno; 1489–before 26 June 1507	Succeeded by Tomás de Córdoba
