= Nikola Ugrinović =

Croat prelate

Nikola Ugrinović OFM (died 1604) was a Croat prelate of the Catholic Church who served as a titular bishop of Smederevo and the apostolic administrator of the Diocese of Duvno from 1575 to 1604 and the Diocese of Bosnia from 1584 to 1588.

== Biography ==
Ugrinović, a Franciscan, was a native of the Republic of Poljica in present-day Croatia. On 24 October 1565 he was appointed the titular bishop of Smederevo and was consecrated on 4 November. Dominik Mandić and Karlo Jurišić suggest that Ugrinović served as a vicar general for the bishop of Duvno Daniel Vocatius whose diocese was under the Ottoman occupation, as well as the parts of the Ottoman-occupied Diocese of Makarska. Ugrinović assumed this role somewhere between 1570 and 1573. Marijan Žuganj, on the other hand, suggests that Ugrinović took over the administration of these two dioceses in 1566. When, in 1575, Bishop Daniel was appointed as the bishop of Muro Lucano in present-day southern Italy, Ugrinović could formally take the office of the apostolic administrator of these dioceses. After the bishop of Bosnia Ante Matković died in 1584, Ugrinović also became the apostolic administrator of the Bosnian diocese. Thus, from 1584 to 1588, Ugrinović administered the entire area served by the Bosnian Franciscans – Central Dalmatia, Herzegovina, Bosnia, Slavonia and Banat.

Ugrinović was an experienced Franciscan. On 12 March 1577, he managed to obtain a firman from Sultan Murat III. However, this wasn't enough to save him from persecution by the local Ottoman authorities. For example, in 1587, he was arrested in Vrgorac and thrown into a prison in Livno, only to be freed with the ransom from the Bosnian Franciscan of 1,000 Venetian liras. The Catholics, together with their clergy, weren't persecuted only by the Ottomans but were also pressured by the renewed Serbian Patriarchate of Peć to pay taxes to them.

After Franjo Baličević was appointed the bishop of Bosnia on 14 November 1588, Ugrinović's jurisdiction was once again limited to the territories of the dioceses of Duvno and Makarska. In his old age, Ugrinović entrusted the administration of these two dioceses to his vicar general Pavao Kačić, while he mainly resided in his native Poljica, living there as a poor man. Ugrinović was, in the end, killed by the Ottomans along with a secular priest and two laymen. The location of his death remains unknown. Filip Lastrić writes that he was killed in Ključ in Bosnia, while Ante Lulić, although with uncertainty, states that the location was Makra near Makarska. Mandić, on the contrary, states that Ugrinović was killed near Klis in the second half of 1603 or the first half of 1604. The folk tales speak of his murder and grave in Lipovica near Gradac, Posušje, where a large stone tomb is located. The modern theory, of which Ante Škegro writes, states that Ugrinović was killed while giving chrism in Bijelo Polje near Potoci, Mostar in Herzegovina.
