= Michael Jahnn =

Michael Jahnn OFM (died 1665) is a Habsburg prelate of the Catholic Church who served as the bishop of Duvno from 1658 to 1663. Warned several times by the Congregation for the Propagation of the Faith for not taking care of his diocese, Jahnn was suspended in 1663. Jahnn served as the provincial of the Franciscan Province of Bohemia from 1650 to 1658, contributing to the renovation of churches and friaries after their devastation during the Thirty Years' War.

== Early life ==
Jahnn was born to a Protestant family from Pomerania at the end of the 16th or the beginning of the 17th century. It is unknown when he converted to Catholicism or when he became a Franciscan. He was a member of the Franciscan Province of Bohemia. In 1634, he was appointed as a definitor and the guardian of the Our Lady of the Snows friary. He was a guardian in other friaries, and he was appointed a definitor again in 1647.

During the Thirty Years' War between the Catholics and the Protestants, Jahnn contributed largely to the Catholic side and the Habsburg monarchy. For this reason, he was appreciated by Emperor Ferdinand III and his son Leopold I. In 1650, he became the provincial of the Bohemian Province and contributed to the renovation of the Province and reconstruction of many friaries, especially the one in Brno demolished by the Swedes.

== Episcopate ==
For his contribution to the Church and the Habsburg monarchy, Cardinal Ernst Adalbert of Harrach, the of archbishop of Prague, proposed that he be appointed a bishop in one of the dioceses in a territory under non-Catholic control. At the same time, the Congregation for the Propagation of the Faith received the news that Pavao Posilović, the bishop of Duvno and administrator of Skradin had died. Thus, at its session on 26 February 1657, the Congregation discussed Harrach's proposal to appoint Jahnn as the bishop of either Duvno or Skradin. On 3 September 1657, after the nuncio in Vienna delivered information on the status of the dioceses and Jahnn's person, the Congregation proposed to the Pope to appoint Jahnn the residential bishop of Duvno. The Pope confirmed the appointment on 15 September. Jahnn was officially promoted at a secret consistory held on 14 January 1658. The same year, he was consecrated in Prague with Harrach as his principal consecrator.

The appointment as a residential bishop under the Ottomans was received unwillingly by Jahnn and those who proposed him as the bishop. During his ad limina visit to Rome, the bishop of Bosnia Marijan Maravić informed the Congregation that a bishop cannot reside in the Diocese of Duvno due to devastation and exodus of the Catholic populace in the diocese. Nevertheless, on 13 May 1658, the Congregation warned Jahnn for not taking over his diocese, which Jahnn wasn't willing to do. At the end of spring 1659, Jahnn travelled to Dalmatia to visit the diocese and take it over. During that time, the Venetians and the Ottomans were fighting the Cretan War, which devastated the diocese, while its population fled to the nearby mountains or Dalmatia. Jahnn received information on the status of his diocese from the expelled Franciscans who brought with them some 3,000 Catholics from the areas of Livno, Duvno, Glamoč, Uskoplje and northern Neretva in 1659. The Franciscans from Rama itself brought 5,000 Catholic refugees. Learning about the situation, Jahnn went to Senj from where he informed Francesco Barberini, the prefect of the Congregation on 24 July 1659 about the poor condition of his diocese, simultaneously asking him for the instructions. The Congregation discussed his report on 22 November 1659 and instructed him to reside nearby. While waiting for the answer, Jahnn returned to the court in Vienna, apparently to resolve the issue of his maintenance. He never returned. Ante Škegro also writes that it is possible that the Bosnian Franciscans were also unwilling to have a foreign bishop on the territory of the Ottoman Bosnia and Herzegovina during an ongoing war. Thus, Škegro points out that Maravić, during his ad limina visit, failed to mention that the bishop could reside in some of the Franciscan friaries.

On 26 March 1661, the State Secretary Cardinal Flavio Chigi complained about Jahnn to Nuncio Carlo Carafa della Spina, stating: "He never wanted to hear a word about residing". He was warned several times for not taking over his diocese, so much so that in 1662 he excused himself due to illness. The Church didn't believe him, which led the nuncio to suspend him from his episcopal duties, which the Congregation confirmed on 5 June 1663. Dominik Mandić writes that Jahnn was indeed ill, as he was unable to move from his home in Bruck an der Mur from December 1662, when he was carried out on a stretcher to be seen by a papal delegate. He died in 1665.

== Footnotes ==
Catholic Church titles
Preceded by Pavao Posilović	Bishop of Duvno; 1658–1663	Succeeded by Silvestro Scarani
