= Stjepan, Bishop of Duvno =

Stjepan
- Bishop of Duvno
- Church: Catholic Church
- Province: Split
- Diocese: Duvno
- In office: Attested 1355–1371 (tenure uncertain)
- Predecessor: John of Léoncel (presumed)
- Successor: Matej (possibly)
- Other posts: Possible auxiliary bishop of Split and administrator of Makarska

Orders
- Rank: Bishop

Personal details
- Died: After 23 April 1371
- Denomination: Catholic

Stjepan (Latin: Stephanus; died after 23 April 1371) was a Croatian prelate of the Catholic Church traditionally identified as the bishop of Duvno during the mid-14th century. He is documented between 1355 and 1371, although the circumstances of his appointment and the extent of his jurisdiction remain uncertain. He was closely associated with Hugolin Brancao, the Archbishop of Split, for whom he served in ecclesiastical roles.

Stjepan has been associated with the Benedictine Abbey of St. Stephen under the Pines near Split, although his membership in the order is unconfirmed. He may also have administered the Diocese of Makarska following the withdrawal of its bishop, Valentine. Archbishop Hugolin granted him ecclesiastical revenues in 1361 or 1362 because of his inadequate income. Stjepan was last documented on 23 April 1371, when he participated in proceedings concerning the Abbey of St. Chrysogonus in Zadar.

== Origins and monastic affiliation ==
Little is known about Stjepan's origins or early ecclesiastical career. The historian Dominik Mandić found no papal records concerning his appointment as bishop of Duvno, but Stjepan's episcopal status is attested by an inscription and several documents from Split and Zadar.

Mandić and the historian Ivan Ostojić associated Stjepan with the Benedictine monks of the Split region. Their interpretation was based partly on his designation as frater in contemporary documents and on an inscription from the Abbey of St. Stephen under the Pines (Sanctus Stephanus de Pinis) near Sumpetar. However, his membership in the Benedictine order remains unestablished.

== Episcopate ==
One of the earliest references to Stjepan is an inscription dated 1 August 1355, associated with a statue of Saint Stephen at the Benedictine Abbey of St. Stephen under the Pines. The inscription identifies a bishop, Stjepan, under the title Dalmatiensis. Split canon Andrija Karlović recorded it in 1717, and Daniele Farlati later reproduced it. Mandić identified the bishop named in the inscription with Stjepan of Duvno, an identification also accepted by Ante Škegro.

On 11 February 1358, Stjepan witnessed a charter issued by King Louis I of Hungary and Croatia. The document identifies him as frater Stephanus, bishop of Duvno, using the Latin title Delmitensis episcopus. On 10 December 1361, he also witnessed proceedings before Archbishop Hugolin concerning a priest's resignation from the churches of St. John and St. Euphemia at Klis.

Škegro, following Slavko Kovačić, considered Stjepan an auxiliary bishop to Archbishop Hugolin, who may have performed episcopal functions on his behalf. The historian Mišo Petrović likewise identified Stjepan as one of Hugolin's ecclesiastical associates, although the available evidence does not establish whether he resided in Duvno or exercised effective jurisdiction there.

== Relations with the Diocese of Makarska ==
Stjepan's episcopate coincided with difficulties affecting the neighbouring dioceses of Duvno and Makarska. Both had been supported by the Šubić family, whose influence declined as the Bosnian rulers expanded their authority in the region. Their bishops consequently struggled to maintain control over their diocesan territories.

The difficulties were particularly evident in the career of Bishop Valentine of Makarska. He received the Benedictine Abbey of St. Stephen under the Pines in commendam to provide for his maintenance, but Archbishop Hugolin disputed his control of its revenues. Petrović states that Valentine had obtained the papal grant by 1351 and had lost control of the abbey by 1359. He suggested that Hugolin may have supported Stjepan because of this dispute.

Škegro considered it possible that Stjepan had resided at the abbey until approximately 1356 and subsequently administered Makarska following Valentine's withdrawal. Petrović, however, questioned whether Valentine had ever permanently returned to Makarska and treated Stjepan's possible appointment as part of Hugolin's efforts to strengthen the metropolitan administration. Neither interpretation establishes that Stjepan was formally appointed bishop of Makarska.

== Ecclesiastical income ==
A notarial instrument documents Stjepan's financial difficulties by recording a grant from Archbishop Hugolin. According to Škegro, on 28 December 1362 the Archbishop granted Stjepan the Church of St. Peter of Gumaj (ecclesia Sancti Petri de Gumay) at Sumpetar, whose former priest, Vučina of Krilo, had relinquished it. The grant was intended to provide Stjepan with maintenance because his episcopal office did not furnish sufficient income.

Petrović, citing Vladimir Rismondo's edition of the notarial register, dates the same transaction to 28 December 1361. He interprets the grant as evidence that Stjepan could not obtain adequate support from Duvno and depended on the Archbishop of Split. The discrepancy between the dates given by the two historians remains unresolved.

== Later life ==
Stjepan is last documented on 23 April 1371, when he witnessed proceedings concerning the Benedictine Abbey of St. Chrysogonus in Zadar. The document identifies him as Stephanus, episcopus Dolmetensis. The proceedings concerned a dispute over the village of Suhovare and were attended by Archbishop Hugolin and other ecclesiastical representatives.

Škegro suggested that Stjepan may have regained control of Duvno under changed political circumstances, although no surviving document confirms such a restoration. On 2 March 1376, the head of the Franciscan custody of Duvno sent five friars to the Bishop of Trogir for priestly ordination. Škegro took this as a possible indication that Duvno lacked a resident bishop at the time.

No further references to Stjepan have been securely established after 1371. His exact date and place of death remain unknown.

== Footnotes ==
Catholic Church titles
Preceded by John of Léoncel	Bishop of Duvno; Attested 1355–1371; tenure uncertain	Succeeded by Matej (possibly); later Juraj Imoćanin
