= Jeronim Makarelić =

Jeronim Makarelić also known as Jerolim Trogiranin or Jeronim Trogiranin (c. 1423 – before 1510) was a Croatian Renaissance poet, polymath and a Catholic priest.

Girolamo Bologni, Makarelić's teacher in Rome, said that Makarelić was "most knowledgeable in both laws, a most skilful asserter of Latin elegance and antiquity, and conspicuous for his excellent learning". Daniele Farlati mentions him as an archpriest and canon who, in 1496, became a vicar to the Archbishop of Split Bartolomeo Averoldi, succeeding Vid Hvaranin. Juraj Šižgorić and Gilberto Grineo praised his poetry.

== Journals ==
- Lučin, Bratislav (2014). "Litterae olim in marmore insculptae: humanistička epigrafija na istočnoj obali Jadrana do Marulićeva doba". Croatica et Slavica Iadertina. X (I): 191–230.
