= Vincenzo Zucconi =

Vincenzo Zucconi (1573 – 1635) was a Habsburg prelate of the Catholic Church who served as the titular bishop of Duvno from 1627 to his death in 1635.

== Biography ==
Zucconi was a native of Mantua in present-day northern Italy. He received favour with Emperor Ferdinand II for his contribution to the marriage between Ferdinand and Eleonora, Ferdinand's relative and goddaughter. He was ordained a deacon on 12 March 1623 and was ordained a priest on 19 March. On the suggestion of Emperor Ferdinand II, Pope Urban VIII appointed Vincenzo Zucconi the titular bishop of Duvno on 30 August 1627, to succeed Alfons de Requesens, who was appointed the bishop of Barbastro in 1625. Zucconi previously served as the provost of the Basilica of St. Peter and St. Paul in Prague. Because he was appointed only a titular bishop, the Pope allowed him to continue his duties and receive a stipend from the basilica, where he served as provost. Since Zucconi wasn't a residential bishop in Duvno, the diocese was administered by Bartul Kačić, the bishop of Makarska. Zucconi owned land in Rychnov nad Kněžnou, where he was buried in the Church of the Holy Trinity.

== Footnotes ==
Catholic Church titles
Preceded by Alfons de Requesens	Bishop of Duvno; 1627–1635	Succeeded by Marijan Maravić
