= Maravić =

Maravić (Serbian Cyrillic: Маравић) is a surname found in Serbia and Croatia.

Notable people with the surname include:

- Dušan Maravić (1939–2025), Serbian footballer
- Ilija Maravić (born 1962), Serbian politician
- Marijan Maravić (1598–1660), Bosnian bishop
- Marko Maravić (born 1979), Slovenian basketball player
- Pete Pistol Maravich June 22, 1947 – January 5, 1988

== See also ==
- Maravich
