= Filippo Riceputi =

Italian historian

Filippo Riceputi (July 11, 1667 – October 5, 1742) was an Italian historian.

== Biography ==
Filippo Riceputi was born in Forlì. In 1693, he was ordained as priest, and in 1694, he was appointed as the rector of the Episcopal Seminary of Macerata, where he taught rhetoric. In 1695, he relocated to Vienna, where he joined the Society of Jesus. There, he began to collect material for what was to become Illyricum sacrum - a work on the history of countries that were a part of the former Roman province of Illyricum. He continued to collect historical material during the service in Jesuit colleges in Gorizia, Rijeka and Trieste, and during the missionary stay in Dalmatia (1709–1715).

In 1716, he went to Venice, whence he was reassigned to the Jesuit college in Padua with the task of completing the ecclesiastical history of Illyricum. In his work on collecting, studying and arranging the material he received help from the Archbishop of Split, Pacifico Bizza. In 1720 the first draft of the work was published. In 1729, it was decided that the work will also cover the secular history of Illyricum, and in 1740, the second draft was published. Until his death, Riceputi had compiled a comprehensive introduction to Illyricum sacrum, and the work was completed by his colleagues Daniele Farlati and Giovanni Giacomo Coleti.

He died in Cesena on 5 October 1742.
