= Jeronim Trogiranin =

Jeronim Trogiranin OFM
- Bishop of Duvno
- Church: Catholic Church
- Province: Split
- Diocese: Duvno
- Appointed: 22 April 1439
- In office: 1439–c. 1459
- Retired: c. 1459
- Predecessor: Juraj Imoćanin (last known bishop)
- Successor: Nikola Cimelić

Orders
- Rank: Bishop

Personal details
- Born: Trogir, Dalmatia
- Died: After 28 February 1465
- Denomination: Catholic

Jeronim Trogiranin OFM (Latin: Hieronymus de Tragurio; died after 28 February 1465) was a Croatian Franciscan prelate of the Catholic Church who served as the bishop of Duvno from 1439 until his resignation around 1459. Appointed by Pope Eugene IV on 22 April 1439, he was required to reside within his diocese and exercise his episcopal functions there. His episcopate coincided with political instability in the territories governed by Stjepan Vukčić Kosača and increasing Ottoman incursions into the region.

After his resignation, Nikola Cimelić succeeded him in January 1460. He spent at least part of his later life in Omiš, where, on 28 February 1465, he transferred his property to a priest from Nerežišća on Brač in exchange for lifelong maintenance and care. His exact date and place of death remain unknown.

== Origins and appointment ==
Jeronim was a member of the Order of Friars Minor, identified in contemporary ecclesiastical documents as Hieronymus de Tragurio. According to Dominik Mandić, he was born in Trogir, although little is known about his early life. By the time of his episcopal appointment, he was a professed Franciscan friar and an ordained priest.

On 22 April 1439, Pope Eugene IV appointed Jeronim as the bishop of Duvno, a suffragan diocese of the Archdiocese of Split. The appointment was issued in Florence and recorded in the papal registers under Registra Lateranensia, volume 365, folios 239v–240r. The bull identifies Jeronim as Hieronymus de Tragurio, electus Dulmensis and entrusts him with the diocese's spiritual and temporal administration.

According to Ante Škegro, the episcopal seat had probably remained vacant for twenty-seven years following the transfer of Juraj Imoćanin to the Diocese of Hvar in 1412. Mandić and Marijan Žugaj suggested that Juraj continued to administer Duvno after his transfer and that the administration may subsequently have been entrusted to Petar Tilikonis, the bishop of Makarska. However, Škegro states that the available documents do not confirm these arrangements.

== Episcopate ==
Jeronim's appointment included an express requirement that he reside within the Diocese of Duvno. Eugene IV instructed him to proceed to his diocese upon receiving the papal letters and prohibited him from exercising episcopal functions outside its territory. Škegro considers that these restrictions were intended to prevent Jeronim from following the example of earlier bishops of Duvno, who had performed their duties from outside the diocese. Whether Jeronim complied with the requirement remains unknown.

On 16 February 1440, the Apostolic Camera recorded a payment of ten florins associated with Jeronim's appointment. The payment was made through Jacopo Badoer, the Archbishop of Split. Although the date has sometimes been associated with Jeronim's episcopal consecration, the surviving entry records a financial transaction rather than the consecration itself.

During Jeronim's episcopate, Stjepan Vukčić Kosača governed the territory of Duvno, whose domains included considerable portions of the dioceses of Duvno, Makarska, and Ston. Stjepan was frequently in conflict with the Catholic King Thomas of Bosnia, while his territories were also threatened by Ottoman incursions.

In 1459, King Thomas expelled leading members of the Bosnian Church; around forty of them, along with an unknown number of ordinary members, found refuge in Stjepan's territories. Škegro considers that these religious developments, coupled with political instability and Ottoman incursions, may have contributed to Jeronim's eventual resignation, particularly if he had attempted to reside within his diocese. However, the actual reason for his resignation remains unknown.

== Resignation ==
After approximately twenty years as the bishop of Duvno, Jeronim resigned around 1459. Mandić attributed his withdrawal to the difficult political and religious circumstances affecting the diocese, while Škegro considered this explanation plausible.

A notarial agreement dated 17 October 1459, concluded at the residence of the Bishop of Nin in Zadar, concerned Jeronim's succession. According to the historian Petar Runje, the Franciscan Nikola Cimelić, also known as Nikola Zadranin, agreed to provide Jeronim with thirty gold ducats. Jeronim was represented in the agreement by the priest Jakov Haluštić, who acted as his procurator.

Cimelić was formally appointed bishop of Duvno on 2 January 1460, as shown in the consistorial minutes from that period. The record states that the appointment followed Jeronim's resignation.

== Later life ==
Jeronim survived his resignation and spent at least part of his later life in Omiš. The last known document mentioning him is a deed of gift dated 28 February 1465, issued in a house associated with the Church of St. Michael. The document identifies him as a former bishop of Duvno, described as episcopus olim Dunnensis, and states that he was mentally sound but physically ill.

Under the terms of the agreement, Jeronim transferred his movable and immovable property, together with his rights and claims, to Juraj Cesarović, a priest from Nerežišća on the island of Brač. In return, Cesarović undertook to provide him with food, clothing and other necessities for the remainder of his life, as well as an honourable burial after his death.

The document confirms that Jeronim was still alive on 28 February 1465. His exact date and place of death remain unknown.

== Footnotes ==
Catholic Church titles
Preceded by Juraj Imoćanin	Bishop of Duvno; 1439–c. 1459	Succeeded by Nikola Cimelić
