= Juraj Imoćanin =

Juraj Imoćanin OFM
- Bishop of Duvno
- Church: Catholic Church
- Province: Split
- Diocese: Duvno
- Appointed: 12 October 1392
- In office: 1392–1412
- Predecessor: Matej (possibly)
- Successor: Uncertain; later Jeronim Trogiranin
- Other posts: Bishop of Hvar (1412–1420; 1423–1428); Bishop of Skradin (1420–1423)

Orders
- Rank: Bishop

Personal details
- Died: 1428
- Denomination: Catholic

Juraj Imoćanin OFM (Latin: Georgius de Ymocha; died 1428) was a Croatian Franciscan prelate of the Catholic Church who served as the bishop of Duvno from 1392 to 1412, the bishop of Hvar from 1412 to 1420 and again from 1423 to 1428, and the bishop of Skradin from 1420 to 1423. He may also have continued administering the Diocese of Duvno after his transfer to Hvar in 1412, although this remains uncertain.

Pope Boniface IX appointed Juraj bishop of Duvno on 12 October 1392. In 1398, he attended an ecclesiastical gathering in Knin alongside several prominent bishops from Croatia and Dalmatia. His transfer to Hvar in 1412 coincided with political instability in the region. Following his appointment to Skradin in 1420, Juraj sought to return to Hvar but faced accusations concerning his earlier administration of the diocese and his relationship with Hrvoje Vukčić Hrvatinić. After an ecclesiastical investigation, Pope Martin V restored him to Hvar in 1423, where he remained until his death.

== Origins and appointment to Duvno ==
Little is known about Juraj's early life or family background. He was a member of the Order of Friars Minor and appears in contemporary ecclesiastical documents as Georgius de Ymocha Minorita. His designation associates him with Imotski, although it does not necessarily establish his birthplace. According to the historian Marijan Žugaj, Juraj probably received his designation from the Franciscan monastery in Imotski, where he may have begun his religious life.

On 12 October 1392, Pope Boniface IX appointed Juraj as the bishop of Duvno, a suffragan diocese of the Archdiocese of Split. His appointment is recorded in the Bullarium Franciscanum, which identifies him as Georgius de Ymocha Minorita and mentions his promotion to the episcopal seat of Duvno, described as Dulmensis or Dumnensis.

Earlier ecclesiastical historians, including Konrad Eubel and Dominik Mandić, placed Juraj later in the episcopal succession. Unable to locate the bull of appointment in the Vatican archives, Mandić followed Eubel and Pius Bonifacius Gams and placed Juraj after Bishop Petar Tilikonis. However, Žugaj showed that Juraj was appointed bishop of Duvno in 1392, almost two years before Petar's appointment to the separate episcopal seat described as Dalmatiensis on 7 September 1394.

Žugaj identified Bishop Matej, who appears in documents from the late 14th century, as Juraj's probable predecessor. He attributed the confusion in the episcopal succession partly to the similarity between the Latin titles Delmitensis, Dalmatiensis and Dumnensis, which earlier historians sometimes treated as referring to the same diocese.

== Episcopate in Duvno ==
Juraj's episcopate coincided with political instability in the Diocese of Duvno. The region was affected by conflicts involving the Kingdom of Bosnia, the Croatian and Hungarian rulers, and the regional nobility of Hum.

In July 1398, Juraj attended an ecclesiastical gathering in Knin, the seat of the Diocese of Knin. He appeared alongside several prominent prelates, including Archbishop Andrew of Split, Bishop Eberhard of Zagreb, Bishop Leonard of Senj, Bishop Anthony of Šibenik and Bishop Chrysogonus of Trogir. The document records Juraj under the title Georgius Dalmatensis. The gathering is documented in the medieval charter collection Zsigmondkori oklevéltár, edited by Elemér Mályusz.

During his episcopate, considerable portions of the territory associated with Duvno were controlled by Juraj Radivojević, a nobleman of Hum, and later his descendants. The Radivojevići, also known as the Vlatkovići, eventually recognised the supremacy of Sandalj Hranić, who was associated with the Bosnian Church. Sandalj's successor and nephew, Stjepan Vukčić Kosača, maintained relations with both the Bosnian Church and the Eastern Orthodox Church. According to Ante Škegro, these circumstances complicated the position of Catholic bishops in the region.

== First episcopate in Hvar ==
On 21 October 1412, Juraj was transferred from the Diocese of Duvno to the Diocese of Hvar. The Bullarium Franciscanum records his transfer and identifies him as the former bishop of Duvno.

The reason for his transfer remains unknown. Škegro believed Juraj may have left Duvno because of the region's difficult political and religious circumstances rather than to obtain a more lucrative episcopal position. He noted that Hvar was among the poorer dioceses of the eastern Adriatic, whose bishops paid considerably lower appointment fees to the papal treasury than those of several neighbouring dioceses.

Mandić, following the earlier account of Daniele Farlati, associated Juraj's appointment to Hvar with the influence of Hrvoje Vukčić Hrvatinić, Duke of Split and a leading nobleman of medieval Bosnia and Croatia. Hrvoje controlled the Dalmatian islands during the reign of Ladislaus of Naples, who claimed the Hungarian and Croatian throne against Sigismund of Luxembourg.

Žugaj rejected Farlati's negative portrayal of Juraj and argued that the accusations concerning his appointment reflected political hostility towards Hrvoje and his supporters. Škegro likewise considered the interpretation that Juraj was motivated primarily by personal ambition or financial gain unfounded.

== Transfer to Skradin ==
On 15 January 1420, Pope Martin V transferred Juraj from Hvar to the Diocese of Skradin. The papal consistorial records record his transfer, and ecclesiastical histories of the Dalmatian dioceses later reproduced it. Peter of Pag was appointed his successor in Hvar.

The transfer occurred as the Republic of Venice consolidated its control over much of coastal Dalmatia. According to Farlati, the Diocese of Hvar was temporarily placed under the administration of the Archbishop of Split before a new bishop was appointed.

In 1421, Dujam Hranković was appointed the bishop of Hvar. However, he died in late 1421 or early 1422, leaving the episcopal seat vacant again. His death prompted Juraj to request permission from Martin V to return to Hvar.

== Dispute over the Hvar bishopric ==
Several individuals opposed Juraj's request to return to Hvar and accused him of misconduct during his earlier administration of the diocese. They alleged that Hrvoje Vukčić Hrvatinić had unlawfully imposed Juraj upon the episcopal seat and that Juraj had used diocesan revenues to obtain papal confirmation of his appointment. Other accusations concerned his management of ecclesiastical property and financial agreements undertaken during his first episcopate in Hvar.

Martin V appointed Blaž Molino, the Archbishop of Zadar, to investigate the accusations and granted him judicial authority over the dispute. The Archbishop was instructed to seek assistance from Bogdan, the bishop of Šibenik, and Nicholas, the abbot of the Benedictine monastery of St. Michael on Ugljan.

According to Farlati, the testimony collected during the investigation was contradictory, preventing the Archbishop from determining the truth of the accusations. Molino therefore referred the proceedings and the collected evidence to the Holy See. He also appointed two ecclesiastical administrators to safeguard the property and revenues of the Diocese of Hvar while the dispute remained unresolved.

Farlati states that Juraj subsequently defended himself before the Pope and was cleared of the accusations. However, later historians disagreed over their reliability. Mandić accepted much of Farlati's negative portrayal of Juraj, while Žugaj argued that the accusations were politically motivated and reflected hostility towards Hrvoje and his supporters. Škegro also disputed the characterisation of Juraj as ambitious or avaricious.

== Return to Hvar ==
On 24 March 1423, Martin V restored Juraj to the Diocese of Hvar, following the death of Bishop Dujam Hranković and the proceedings concerning Juraj's earlier administration. He thus returned to the episcopal seat he had governed before his transfer to Skradin.

Juraj remained the bishop of Hvar until his death, generally dated to 1428. Farlati records that, on 16 December 1428, Martin V appointed Thomas Tomasini as his successor following Juraj's death. The official episcopal succession of the Diocese of Hvar also dates Juraj's death to 1428, although it places the beginning of Tomasini's episcopate in 1429.

Mandić and Škegro, however, date Juraj's death to 1429. The discrepancy reflects differing chronologies in the historical literature.

== Possible administration of Duvno after 1412 ==
Whether Juraj continued to administer the Diocese of Duvno after his transfer to Hvar in 1412 remains uncertain.

Mandić and Žugaj suggested that Juraj retained responsibility for administering Duvno while serving as the bishop of Hvar and subsequently Skradin. They considered such an arrangement probable because of the difficult political circumstances in the diocese and the absence of a documented successor following Juraj's transfer.

Škegro considered this interpretation plausible but noted that no surviving documents establish whether Juraj continued to exercise jurisdiction over Duvno or how such an administration would have functioned. The period between Juraj's transfer to Hvar in 1412 and the appointment of Jeronim Trogiranin as the bishop of Duvno in 1439 remains poorly documented.

== Footnotes ==
Catholic Church titles
Preceded by Matej (according to Žugaj); Stjepan (traditional succession)	Bishop of Duvno; 1392–1412	Succeeded by Succession uncertain; later Jeronim Trogiranin
Preceded by Bevenuto	Bishop of Hvar; 1412–1420	Succeeded by Peter of Pag
Preceded by Pietro Santo	Bishop of Skradin; 1420–1423	Succeeded by Nicholas of Split
Preceded by Dujam Hranković	Bishop of Hvar; 1423–1428	Succeeded by Thomas de Venezia
