= Stjepan Blašković =

Croatian and Bosnian-Herzegovinian prelate

The Most Reverend Stjepan Blašković C.O. Servant of God
- Bishop of Makarska
- Church: Catholic Church
- Diocese: Makarska
- Appointed: 24 September 1731
- Installed: Summer 1732
- Predecessor: Nikola Bijanković
- Successor: Fabijan Blašković

Orders
- Ordination: 17 December 1712
- Consecration: 10 February 1732 by Marco Gradenigo

Personal details
- Born: 2 January 1689 Gornje Selo, Republic of Venice
- Died: 17 November 1776 (aged 87) Makarska, Republic of Venice
- Buried: Church of St. Philip, Makarska, Croatia
- Denomination: Catholic

Stjepan Blašković C.O. (c. 2 January 1689 – 17 November 1776) was a Croatian and Bosnian-Herzegovinian prelate of the Catholic Church who served as the bishop of Makarska from 1732 to his death in 1776. While being a bishop of Makarska, Blašković also administered the dioceses of Duvno under the Ottoman occupation.

== Early life ==
Blašković was born in Gornje Selo on the isle of Šolta, at the time part of the Republic of Venice. He was educated by the Oratorians whom he joined. On 12 December 1712, he was ordained to the diaconate, and to the priesthood on 17 December 1712. Blašković earned a doctorate in civil and canon law.

== Episcopate ==
On 24 September 1731, Bijanković was appointed the bishop of Makarska. He was consecrated in Venice on 10 February 1732, with Marco Gradenigo, the patriarch of Venice as the principal consecrator and Nikola Tomašić, the bishop of Skradin and Pietro Maria Suárez, the bishop of Feltre as the co-consecrators.

Bijanković arrived in Makarska at the beginning of the summer of that year. Blašković sent thirteen reports to the Congregation for the Propagation of the Faith about his pastoral visits from 1734 to 1771. In 1756, he finished constructing the Makarska Cathedral. He built the Church of St. Philip Neri in 1757 and a building for the Oratorians (which burnt down on 20 September 1766). In 1772, Blašković also built a lodging with special rooms for Illyrian clergy, including those being educated in Makarska.

Based on the traditional rights of the bishop of Makarska, Blašković also administered the Diocese of Duvno under the Ottoman occupation, which he visited during July and August 1735. In his report from 25 May 1734 to the Holy See, Blašković states that parts of the diocese were under the care of the Franciscans of the Fojnica friary. During his visit, Blašković stayed in Studenci, Gradac, Vir, Zavelim, Roško Polje, Buško Blato and the Duvanjsko Polje, where he stayed for around ten days. In the Duvanjsko Polje, Blašković met with the Muslim beys of the Kopčić family, who attended the Catholic ceremonies and asked him for prayers and relics. Then, Blašković went to Rama where he also stayed for around ten days and met with the local Muslim beys and the kadi of Prozor. The beys blamed him for the flight of the Catholics in 1687 and accused the Franciscans of destroying the Rama friary. To prevent further exodus of Catholic serfs and bring back those who fled, the beys asked Blašković to reside in Rama, promising him the Franciscan possessions, a pay of 300 sequins, and additional means for maintenance. Blašković went on to visit Rakitno and then Mostar. Blašković visited Rama again in 1737.

After the Treaty of Passarowitz, Pope Clement XII established the Apostolic Vicariate of Bosnia, which incorporated the dioceses and their parts under Ottoman occupation. These included the Diocese of Duvno and Bosnia and the parts of the Diocese of Makarska and the Archdiocese of Split. Thus, the church aligned its organisation to the political situation. The initiative came from the Bosnian Franciscans led by Archbishop Vicko Zmajević of Zadar. It aligned with Ottoman policy that the Catholic clergy and bishops be Ottoman subjects. The Congregation accepted this initiative and on 20 June 1735, asked the pope to appoint a special bishop for the Catholics under the Ottoman occupation, and that he should be from the ranks of the Bosnian Franciscans. To keep the parishes incorporated to the vicariate, Blašković continued to make pastoral visits to them and establish new parishes by dividing the larger ones. For this reason, he clashed with the Bosnian Franciscans. In his report to the Holy See from 7 November 1749, he mentioned specific areas of the dioceses regarding which he was in dispute with the bishop of Bosnia.

Blašković published the translation of Robert Bellarmine's catechism under the title Nauk kršćanski (The Christian teaching) in Venice in 1758.

Blašković died in Makarska and is buried in the Church of St. Philip.

== Footnotes ==
Catholic Church titles
Preceded by Marijan Lišnjić	Bishop of Makarska; 1699–1730	Succeeded by Fabijan Blašković
