= Locum Beati Petri =

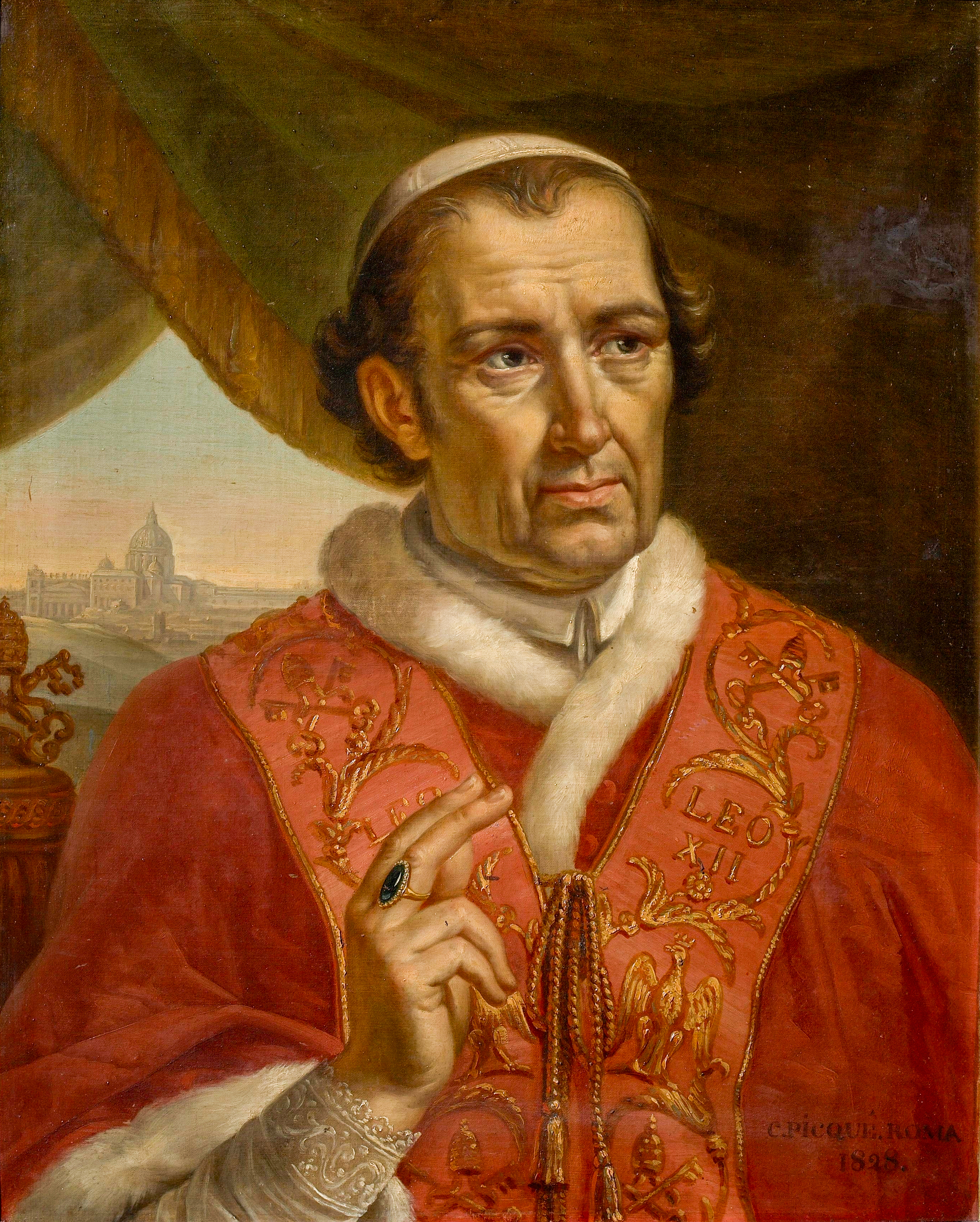
Pop Leo XII, 1828

Locum Beati Petri was a papal bull issued by Pope Leo XII on 30 June 1828, reorganizing the ecclesiastical jurisdiction in Dalmatia.

The bull degraded the Archdiocese of Split to the level of a diocese. The Diocese of Makarska was merged with the Diocese of Split creating the Diocese of Split-Makarska. The diocese became subject of the Archdiocese of Zadar which was proclaimed seat of the Dalmatian ecclesiastical province.

The Archdiocese of Ragusa was also degraded to the level of a diocese. The Diocese of Poreč was merged with the Diocese of Pula creating Diocese of Poreč-Pula. Eight dioceses were abolished: Diocese of Korčula, Diocese of Ston, Diocese of Novigrad, Diocese of Osor, Diocese of Rab, Diocese of Skradin, Diocese of Nin and Diocese of Trogir.
