= Nikola Cimelić =

Nikola Cimelić OFM
- Bishop of Duvno
- Church: Catholic Church
- Province: Split
- Diocese: Duvno
- Appointed: 2 January 1460
- In office: 1460–unknown (last documented in 1470)
- Predecessor: Jeronim Trogiranin
- Successor: Vid Hvaranin
- Other post: Episcopal functions in the Patriarchate of Aquileia (1463–1464)
- Previous post: Vicar of the Franciscan Vicariate of Bosnia (attested 1450–1452)

Orders
- Rank: Bishop

Personal details
- Born: Zadar, Dalmatia
- Died: Between 7 September 1470 and 2 October 1489
- Denomination: Catholic
- Parents: Ivan Cimelić and Agnezina

Nikola Cimelić or Nikola Zadranin OFM (Latin: Nicolaus de Iadera; died between 1470 and 1489) was a Croatian Franciscan prelate of the Catholic Church who served as the bishop of Duvno from 1460 until an unknown date and as the vicar of the Franciscan Vicariate of Bosnia during the 1450s. Because of Ottoman incursions into his diocese, he fled to Dalmatia and later preached a crusade against the Ottomans in Friuli and Istria. He also performed episcopal functions within the Patriarchate of Aquileia.

Cimelić was appointed the bishop of Duvno on 2 January 1460, succeeding Jeronim Trogiranin. He spent much of his later life outside the diocese and is last mentioned in his will of 7 September 1470, written in Zadar. His exact date of death remains unknown.

== Family ==
Cimelić, a member of the Order of Friars Minor, was born in Zadar. His parents were Ivan and Agnezina, and his paternal grandfather was Ostoja. He came from the Cimelić family, whose surname appears in various forms, including Cmelich, Zimelich, Cimel, Cmel and Cimelich. His father, Ivan, first mentioned in 1435, was a reputable Zadar citizen. Nikola had a brother, Petar, who was a wealthy merchant, and at least four sisters: Klara, who married into the Krizančić family; Katarina; Perucia, who married into the Budačić family; and Nikoleta, who married into the de Mediolano family.

== Franciscan Vicar of Bosnia ==
A document from Dubrovnik dated 1465 mentions an earlier writing from 1450 in which Friar Nikola was identified as the vicar of the Franciscan Vicariate of Bosnia. Another document from 1451 identifies him as the vicar of the entire vicariate (vicarius tocius vicarie Bosne). In this capacity, he appointed representatives for the friars and friaries of St. Jerome in Ugljan, St. Domnius in Pašman and St. Catherine in Novigrad, as well as the Franciscan Vicariate of Bosnia. The appointment took place at St. Francis Church in Zadar.

In 1452, Cimelić appointed Father Krešul as his representative before the knyaz of Split, Vittore Delfino, to recover books and other movable property belonging to Bosnian friars. In 1453, his sister Klara left him ten gold ducats in her will, requesting that he arrange for Masses to be celebrated and fulfil her religious vows. In 1459, Cimelić received permission from Rome to hold an ecclesiastical benefice, from which observant Franciscans were ordinarily prohibited.

== Episcopate ==
Cimelić's prospective appointment as the bishop of Duvno is evident from a contract dated 17 October 1459, in which he agreed to support his predecessor, Jeronim Trogiranin, with thirty gold ducats. The contract was concluded at the residence of the Bishop of Nin in Zadar, with Jeronim represented by the priest Jakov Haluštić.

On 2 January 1460, Pope Pius II appointed Cimelić bishop of Duvno, as shown in the consistorial minutes from that period. Petar Runje suggests that his episcopal consecration probably took place shortly after his appointment.

His appointment was complicated, as the diocese's territory was under the control of Stjepan Vukčić Kosača, a nobleman associated with the Bosnian Church who was in conflict with the Catholic King Thomas. Stjepan's territories were also threatened by Ottoman incursions, while his son Vladislav Hercegović sought Ottoman support in a conflict with his father.

In 1461, Cimelić sent the Pope several requests, which the Archbishop of Zadar, Maffeo Valaresso, granted through intercession. In June of the same year, Cimelić served as a judge delegated by Rome in proceedings to enforce a papal bull concerning Jelena, a citizen of Zadar.

Because of Ottoman incursions, Cimelić, like the local knyaz Pavao Klešić and other influential people from the region, fled Duvno. For some time, he resided in his native Zadar.

== Activities in Friuli ==
At the end of July and beginning of August 1463, Cimelić was in Venice with the papal legate Cardinal Bessarion, who was tasked with encouraging the Republic of Venice to wage war against the Ottomans. Bessarion appointed Cimelić to preach for the Crusade in Friuli and Istria, a role he began in August 1463.

During his time in Friuli, Cimelić sought an ecclesiastical position in Gemona. According to Škegro, the Gemona city council accepted him as its bishop on 3 April 1464, although papal confirmation remains undocumented. The historian Janez Höfler, however, states that Cimelić unsuccessfully sought an ecclesiastical benefice and subsequently the position of parish priest in Gemona. The town belonged to the Patriarchate of Aquileia rather than a separate diocese.

Dominik Mandić suggested that the Holy See probably did not approve Cimelić's transfer and required him to return to either Duvno or a nearby Dalmatian town from which he could administer the diocese.

Cimelić continued exercising episcopal functions outside Duvno. Höfler records that he issued an indulgence charter on 20 December 1463 and another during 1464. On 9 June 1464, he consecrated the Church of St. Gregory in Kobdilj, near Komen in present-day Slovenia, together with its principal and two side altars. Höfler also notes that Cimelić performed episcopal functions on behalf of the Patriarch of Aquileia, Ludovico Trevisan.

== Later life ==
Cimelić continued to appear in Zadar records after his activities in Friuli. In 1465 and 1470, he served as a judge in two proceedings. The first concerned a dispute between Petar Cimelić and Jeronim Krizančić, while the second involved a divorce between Marta and her husband from Perljan.

On 7 September 1470, Cimelić wrote his will while bedridden in his brother Petar's house in Zadar. He left his books to the friary in Zadar, a boat to the friary in Pašman and a breviary to Friar Jakov, his confessor. He also left money and valuables to his nephews, the nephews of Friar Juraj, and the friaries in Zadar, Pašman, Ugljan and Novigrad. He left his land to his nephew Ivan, and a vineyard to the friars of St. John's friary outside Zadar. He wished to be buried in St. Francis' Church in Zadar.

The will is the last known document mentioning Cimelić during his lifetime. His exact date of death remains unknown. However, he was still alive on 7 September 1470, while the bull appointing Vid Hvaranin as the bishop of Duvno on 2 October 1489 identifies Nikola as his deceased predecessor. Cimelić therefore died sometime between those two dates.

== Footnotes ==
Catholic Church titles
Preceded by Unknown	Vicar of the Franciscan Vicariate of Bosnia; Attested 1450–1452	Succeeded by Unknown
Preceded by Jeronim Trogiranin	Bishop of Duvno; 1460–unknown	Succeeded by Vid Hvaranin
