= Filip Lastrić =

Bosnian Franciscan friar (1700 - 1783)

Philippus Lastric ab Ocevia

Filip Lastrić (born Martin Jakovović; 1700 – 19 April 1783), also known as Philippus de Occhievia, was a Bosnian writer and friar of the Franciscan Province of Bosna Argentina. His works include the first overview of the geography and history of Bosnia and Herzegovina.

== Family ==
Lastrić was born in a hamlet called Lastre, from which his cognomen derives, part of the village Oćevija near Vareš in the Sanjak of Bosnia, Ottoman Empire. Christened Martin, he was one of at least four children of Jakov Ivanić. The family was quite poor. His younger sisters, Anđelija and Lucija, lived in Kraljeva Sutjeska following marriage, while a brother is known to have required financial help from the already ordained Lastrić.

== Education and career ==
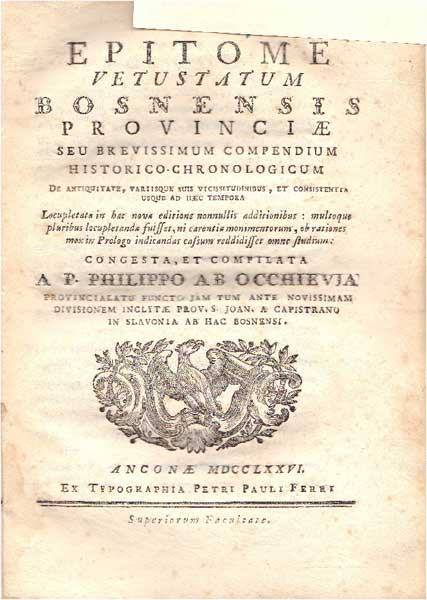
Front page of Epitome vetustatum Bosnensis provinciae

Lastrić probably came to the monastery of Kraljeva Sutjeska between 1712 and 1714, as the rules of the monastery stipulated that the boys should be between 12 and 14 years old upon arrival. At the monastery, Lastrić learned to read and write in "Illyrian, Latin and Italian language", as well as the Bosnian Cyrillic and Latin script. He became a novice in 1719, taking the name Filip. He continued his studies in the Papal States town of Narni, where he was ordained a priest in 1724.

Lastrić's career started in the Slavonian town of Požega, where he taught philosophy between 1726 and 1729. He then returned to Kraljeva Sutjeska, becoming teacher of the novices. He became custos of Bosna Argentina in 1734, and was promoted to provincial superior in 1741. As such, he was very vocal in defending Bosnian Franciscans and lay Catholics in Rome and Vienna as well as in Ottoman courts. He served as provincial superior until 1745. Thanks to Lastrić's insistence in Rome, Bosna Srebrena was restored to the rank of province by Pope Clement XIII on 15 December 1758, a year after it was demoted to a custody due to the low number of monasteries and friars.

Filip Lastrić died of a heart attack in Kraljeva Sutjeska on 19 April 1783.

== Works ==
The surviving works by Filip Lastrić include a philosophy manual (preserved in manuscript) composed during his stay in Požega, four sermon collections, as well as an overview of the history of Bosna Srebrena. The latter, titled Epitome vetustatum Bosnensis provinciae (Pregled starina Bosanske provincije) and published in 1765, includes the first work on Bosnian geography and history. Lastrić also assisted foreigners in their writings about Bosnia, such as the Venetian Jesuit Daniele Farlati (Illyricum sacrum) and the Hungarian Piarist Elek Horányi. Lastrić's other notable works are:

- Testimonium bilabium (Dvojezično svjedočanstvo), 1755
- Od uzame, 1765
- Nediljnik dvostruk: govorenja za svaku nedilju, 1766
- Svetnjak: govorenja za svetkovinu, 1766
