= Matej (bishop) =

14th-century Catholic bishop associated with Makarska and Duvno

- Bishop associated with Duvno and Makarska
- Church: Catholic Church
- Province: Split
- Diocese: Duvno or Makarska (disputed)
- In office: Attested 1375–1392; possibly 1399
- Predecessor: Stjepan (proposed for Duvno)
- Successor: Juraj Imoćanin (proposed for Duvno)
- Other post: Vicar of the Archbishop of Split (attested 1385)

Orders
- Rank: Bishop

Personal details
- Denomination: Catholic

Matej (Latin: Matthaeus; active 1375–1399) was a Croatian prelate of the Catholic Church associated with the medieval dioceses of Makarska and Duvno during the late 14th century. Contemporary documents list him under several episcopal titles, including Delmitensis, Dalmatiensis and Dalmiensis. The extent of his jurisdiction and the circumstances of his episcopal appointments remain uncertain.

Matej was also a vicar of the Archbishop of Split. The historian Marijan Žugaj identified him as a Franciscan and a predecessor of Juraj Imoćanin in Duvno, while Ivan Ostojić associated him with the Benedictine Abbey of St. Andrew on Svetac. Ante Škegro suggested that Matej may have administered Duvno while serving as the bishop of Makarska or as the Archbishop's vicar. His exact date and place of death remain unknown.

== Origins and religious affiliation ==
Little is known about Matej's origins or early ecclesiastical career. Žugaj suggested that he was a Franciscan from Dubrovnik, identifying him with Matthaeus de Ragusio, whom Pope Clement VI appointed a papal chaplain on 8 July 1348. However, the identification of this friar with the later bishop remains uncertain.

Ostojić considered Matej a Benedictine monk and associated him with the Abbey of St. Andrew on the island of Svetac. He suggested that Matej served as abbot of the monastery during the 1370s. Joško Bracanović also identified a Bishop Mate who, in 1375, held the abbey and collected its revenues (possessor et collector). Bracanović considered a Benedictine affiliation probable, although the evidence does not establish Matej's membership in the order.

== Episcopate ==
On 5 March 1375, Matej witnessed an agreement concerning a house in Trogir. The document identifies him as frater Matheus, bearing the episcopal title Delmitensis. Žugaj interpreted the record as evidence that Matej had been elected bishop of Duvno but had not yet received papal confirmation.

A record from 1385, cited by the historian Mišo Petrović, identifies Matej as the bishop of Makarska and Dalmia and vicar of the Archbishop of Split (Mattheo episcopo Mucurensi et Dalminianensi, vicario archiepiscopi). In 1386, Matej appeared in proceedings concerning the collection of ecclesiastical tithes in Oriovica, within the Diocese of Trogir, under the title episcopus Dalmatiensis. A document dated around 1390 also described him as bishop of Makarska and Dalmia and vicar of Archbishop Andreas Gualdi of Split.

On 18 May 1392, Matej witnessed an agreement in the palace of the Archbishop of Split. He was described as frater Matheus, episcopus Dalmatie, or Bishop of Dalmatia. In 1399, a bishop, Matej, styled episcopus Dalmiensis, was recorded in Split as a party to proceedings against a lessee of the revenues from the village of Srinjin.

== Administration of Duvno and Makarska ==
Matej's episcopal titles have led to different interpretations of his jurisdiction. Žugaj identified him as the bishop of Duvno from approximately 1375 to 1392 and the probable successor of Stjepan. He distinguished the titles associated with Duvno from Dalmatiensis, which he regarded as referring to another episcopal jurisdiction, and identified Matej as the predecessor of Juraj Imoćanin, appointed bishop of Duvno in October 1392.

Škegro considered it possible that Matej administered Duvno while serving as the bishop of Makarska or as the vicar of Archbishop Andreas Gualdi. He noted that the title Dalmiensis used in 1399 could not readily refer to Duvno, since Juraj had already been appointed to that diocese. Škegro suggested that the title might instead refer to Makarska, whose bishops were sometimes described using titles derived from Dalmatia.

Petrović likewise described the administration of Duvno and Makarska during this period as uncertain. He noted that the two dioceses sometimes appeared under a single bishop and suggested that their bishops may have exercised largely titular functions because of the region's political circumstances. Unlike the established Dalmatian dioceses, Duvno and Makarska lacked effective local institutions and support for resident bishops.

== Later life and succession ==
The Franciscan historian Luke Wadding recorded that Juraj Imoćanin succeeded a bishop named Matthias following his death (per obitum Matthiae). Žugaj identified Matthias with Matej and consequently dated his death to before Juraj's appointment in October 1392.

However, Škegro identified a Bishop Matej who continued to appear in Split's ecclesiastical records in 1399. It remains uncertain whether Wadding's account and the 1399 document concern the same bishop or reflect different identifications of the episcopal titles.

Matej's exact date and place of death remain unknown.
