= Giovanni Coletti =

Giovanni Coletti may refer to:

- Giovanni Battista Coletti (born 1948), Italian fencer
- Giovanni Giacomo Coleti (1734–1827), or Coletti, Italian historian and philologist
