= Tomás de Córdoba =

Spanish prelate

Tomás de Córdoba OCist (died c. 1514) was a Spanish prelate of the Catholic Church who was a titular bishop of Duvno from 1507 to 1514.

== Biography ==
Tomás was a Cistercian abbot of the Convent of Holy Martyrs in Córdoba. After the death of Vid of Hvar, Pope Julius II appointed him the bishop of Duvno on 26 June 1507. Although he was appointed as the residential bishop, Tomás was in reality only a titular bishop, the first in the line of such bishops who held the title of the bishop of Duvno until 1551. By September 1508, he was already consecrated as the bishop and resolved marital issues in Seville. Tomás was granted control of the Cisertanian convent where he lived before his episcopal appointment. He was the last abbot of the convent. By the time Álvaro Salas Sánchez was appointed as his successor as the bishop of Duvno on 27 July 1514, Tomás had already died.

== Footnotes ==
Catholic Church titles
Preceded by Vid Hvaranin	Bishop of Duvno; 1507–1514	Succeeded by Álvaro Salas Sánchez
