= Balthasar Schitter =

Austrian prelate

Balthasar Schitter (2 January 1793 – 19 October 1868) was an Austrian prelate of the Catholic Church who served as an auxiliary bishop of Salzburg from 1850 to his death in 1868.

== Biography ==
Schitter was born into a farming family in Mariapfarr. He studied at the Lyceum in Salzburg from 1813 to 1817 and was ordained a priest in 1816. In Mariapfarr, he was appointed a curate in 1817, a coadjutor parish priest in 1818 and a provisional parish priest in 1821. In 1825, Schitter worked as a cooperator in the parish of St. Andrea in Salzburg. The following year, he became a parish priest in Westendorf, Tyrol, which served as a centre of the Manharter sect. While there, Schitter contributed significantly to the reversion of many followers of this sect back to Catholicism. In 1833, he was appointed the dean of Salzburg and provisional parish priest of the Salzburg Cathedral, and in 1835, he was appointed to the cathedral chapter and consistory. From 1835 to 1844, Schitter served as the city dean and cathedral priest. In 1844, he became a superintendent of the diocesan school, and in 1849, he was appointed a cathedral custodian.

On 20 May 1850, Schitter was appointed the titular bishop of Duvno and an auxiliary bishop in Salzburg. He was consecrated in the Salzburg Cathedral on 28 July, with Cardinal Friedrich Prince zu Schwarzenberg, the archbishop of Prague as his principal consecrator and Bishop Anton Martin Slomšek of Lavant and Bishop Georg von Oettl of Eichstätt as co-consecrators. In 1851, he became a cathedral dean and in 1857 a cathedral provost. From 1856 to 1864, he served as president of the prince-archbishop's metropolitan court.

== Footnotes ==
Catholic Church titles
Preceded by Johann Aloys Hoffmann	Bishop of Duvno; 1850–1868	Succeeded by Dominic Manucy
