= Álvaro Salas Sánchez =

16th-century Spanish Catholic bishop of Duvno

Álvaro Salas Sánchez O.S.A.
- Bishop of Duvno
- Church: Catholic Church
- Province: Split
- Diocese: Duvno
- Appointed: 27 July 1514
- In office: 1514–before 19 December 1520
- Predecessor: Tomás de Córdoba
- Successor: Andrés Clemente de Torrecremata

Orders
- Consecration: By 29 August 1514
- Rank: Bishop

Personal details
- Born: Burgos, Crown of Castile
- Died: 12 October 1520
- Denomination: Catholic

Álvaro Salas Sánchez O.S.A. (Latin: Alvarus de Salas; died before 19 December 1520) was a Spanish Augustinian prelate of the Catholic Church who served as bishop of Duvno from 1514 until his death. Pope Leo X appointed him after the death of Tomás de Córdoba, when the diocese was under Ottoman control. Although appointed to the diocesan see, he is regarded as an effectively titular bishop, with no evidence that he took canonical possession of Duvno.

Before his appointment, Álvaro was a friar of the Order of Saint Augustine and a theology professor. His appointment included a papal dispensation and payment of the prescribed fees. He also served as an auxiliary bishop of Córdoba. His precise death date remains uncertain.

== Origins and religious life ==
Little is known about Álvaro's early life. Mandić identified him as a Spanish Augustinian friar and professor of theology, citing papal appointment documents that describe him as a member of the Order of the Hermits of Saint Augustine. Mandić suggested a possible origin in Catalonia, based on the place-name Salas, but did not establish his birthplace. However, the Spanish historian Emiliano Nebreda Perdiguero, in a study of notable people from the province of Burgos, identifies Álvaro as a native of Burgos and places his birth in the second half of the 15th century. This differs from Mandić's tentative geographical identification.

== Appointment to Duvno ==
On 27 July 1514, Pope Leo X appointed Álvaro bishop of Duvno, a suffragan diocese of the Archdiocese of Split, following the death of Tomás de Córdoba. The papal appointment was addressed not only to the new bishop but also to the cathedral chapter, clergy and population of Duvno. On 8 August 1514, Leo X granted Álvaro a dispensation from any ecclesiastical impediments or penalties that might prevent his episcopal consecration. On 29 August 1514, Álvaro paid the prescribed episcopal appointment fee of eleven ducats and twenty-five balistas in Rome. According to Mandić, he had already been consecrated bishop by then. The exact date and consecrating minister are unknown.

== Episcopate ==
Álvaro's appointment occurred after Ottoman advances had severely disrupted the Diocese of Duvno. By 1513, Ottoman forces had occupied additional strongholds in the region, and raids continued into neighbouring Dalmatia during his episcopate. Škegro found no evidence that Álvaro visited Duvno or assumed canonical possession of his see, and treated him as one of the bishops who held the title while residing outside the diocese. Škegro interpreted his appointment as part of Leo X's wider policy of supporting resistance to Ottoman expansion.

Álvaro also served as an auxiliary bishop of Córdoba.

== Death and succession ==
Álvaro died on 12 October 1520. On 19 December 1520, when Leo X appointed Andrés Clemente de Torrecremata as bishop of Duvno. The consistorial record explicitly states the see was vacant after Álvaro's death.

== Footnotes ==
Catholic Church titles
| Preceded by Tomás de Córdoba | Bishop of Duvno; 1514–before 19 December 1520 | Succeeded by Andrés Clemente de Torrecremata |
