= Petar Tilikonis =

14th- and 15th-century Franciscan bishop

Petar Tilikonis OFM (Latin: Petrus Petri Tilikonis; died after 9 September 1413, possibly in 1419) was a Franciscan prelate of the Catholic Church appointed bishop of an episcopal see described as Dalmatiensis in 1394. Historians have associated the see with the Diocese of Makarska, although its relationship with the Diocese of Duvno remains disputed. Petar later served in Poland as an auxiliary bishop in the Diocese of Płock and the Archdiocese of Gniezno.

Petar was appointed by Pope Boniface IX on 7 September 1394, succeeding a bishop named Ivan. Although the appointment required him to reside in his diocese, his subsequent activities are documented chiefly in Poland between 1405 and 1413. Marijan Žugaj suggested that Petar later administered Duvno until 1439, but this remains unconfirmed and conflicts with a Polish biographical account which places his death around 1419.

== Origins and appointment ==
Little is known about Petar's origins or early ecclesiastical career. His appointment bull identifies him as the son of a man named Petar Tilikonis. The Polish historian Tadeusz Żebrowski suggested that his family may have been connected with individuals named Tylkon recorded in Sandomierz and near Biecz during the 14th century, although neither identification has been established.

Petar was a professed member of the Order of Friars Minor and served as a papal penitentiary before his episcopal appointment. On 7 September 1394, Pope Boniface IX appointed him bishop of the see described as Dalmatiensis, following the death of its previous bishop, Ivan. The bull, Apostolatus officium, instructed Petar to reside personally within his diocese and prohibited him from performing episcopal functions outside its territory.

Scholars have disputed the identification of Petar's diocese. Dominik Mandić included him among the bishops of Duvno, while Ante Škegro identified the Dalmatiensis see with Makarska, also known as the Diocese of Krajina. Žugaj distinguished it from Duvno, pointing out that Juraj Imoćanin had been appointed Bishop of Duvno in October 1392, almost two years before Petar's appointment. Both appointments were made by Boniface IX.

== Episcopal activities in Poland ==
Polish ecclesiastical records document Petar's later activities. On 20 September 1405, he witnessed a document issued by Jakub of Korzkiew, the bishop of Płock. In May 1406, he attended a synod at Kalisz. By 1409, he was serving as an auxiliary bishop of Płock. In August of that year, he joined representatives sent by the bishop and cathedral chapter to Ulrich von Jungingen, grand master of the Teutonic Order, to secure protection for church property.

During the vacancy of the metropolitan see of Gniezno, Petar performed episcopal functions there in the autumn of 1411 and in March 1412. On one occasion, he was described as an auxiliary bishop of Gniezno. He subsequently returned to Płock, where he witnessed the foundation charter of Wola Łącka in June 1412 and granted indulgences to the church of the Canons Regular at Czerwińsk nad Wisłą in July.

The last documented reference to Petar in Poland dates to 9 September 1413, when he appeared as an auxiliary bishop of Płock in a charter establishing the parish church at Rzekuń, near Ostrołęka. He had left Płock by 1415, when another bishop was performing its auxiliary episcopal functions. Żebrowski considered it possible that Petar had returned to his diocese after 1413, although no surviving document confirms his return.

== Diocese of Makarska ==
According to Škegro, the diocese entrusted to Petar was associated with Makarska, whose episcopal seat was known as Makar or Mukur. Much of its territory was affected by conflicts among Hrvoje Vukčić Hrvatinić, his relatives and Sandalj Hranić. Sandalj seized possessions associated with the Vojsalić family, including Makar, Labčanj, Gradac, Drvenik, Pasičina and Miluša. Škegro suggested that these conditions prevented Petar from residing at his episcopal seat and that he may instead have lived within the Archdiocese of Split.

In 1417, King Ostoja of Bosnia confirmed the claims of members of the Vojsalić family to Makar, Labčanj, and other coastal possessions. A charter issued by Duke Juraj Vojsalić in 1434 later restored other lands Sandalj had seized to local noble families. These documents provide evidence of the disputed political control of the Makarska region, but do not establish Petar's whereabouts during those years.

== Later life and disputed succession ==
The end of Petar's episcopate remains uncertain. Žugaj recorded him as bishop of the Dalmatiensis see from 1394, certainly still active in 1412, and treated a tenure continuing until 1439 as hypothetical. He suggested that Petar may have administered the Diocese of Duvno following the death of Juraj Imoćanin, whom Žugaj dated to 1429, until the appointment of Jeronim Trogiranin in 1439.

Škegro considered such an arrangement possible, but emphasised that no surviving document confirms Petar's administration of Duvno. The papal bull appointing Jeronim in 1439 refers instead to the vacancy following Juraj's transfer from Duvno to Hvar in 1412.

Żebrowski, however, proposed a shorter chronology based on Polish and papal records. He stated that Pope Martin V appointed a Franciscan named Blažej to the Dalmatiensis episcopal see in September 1419 and therefore considered it probable that Petar had died by that time. This differs from Žugaj's proposed continuation of Petar's episcopate into the 1430s. The last securely dated record of Petar's own activities remains the document of 9 September 1413, and his exact date and place of death are unknown.

== Footnotes ==
Catholic Church titles
Preceded by Ivan	Bishop of Makarska (identified with Dalmatiensis by Škegro); 1394–unknown	Succeeded by Blažej (appointed to Dalmatiensis in 1419, according to Żebrowski)
