= Francesco Maria Biordi =

Italian prelate

Francesco Maria Biordi (7 October 1764 – 7 October 1817) was an Italian prelate of the Catholic Church who served as an apostolic administrator of Anagni and the titular bishop of Duvno from 1816 to his death in 1817.

Biordi was ordained to the priesthood on 7 October 1787. Before his episcopate, Biordi was a vicar general of the Diocese of Porto–Santa Rufina. On 25 August 1817, he administered confirmation to Gioacchino Pecci, the future Pope Leo XIII in the Church of St. Nicholas in Carpineto Romano.

== Footnotes ==
Catholic Church titles
Preceded by Silvestro Scarani	Bishop of Duvno; 1816–1817	Succeeded by Joseph Chrysostomus Pauer
