= Diocese of Duvno =

Former Catholic diocese

Coordinates: 43°43′18″N 17°13′32″E

Diocese of Duvno in the 15th century

The Diocese of Duvno (Latin: Dioecesis Dumnensis; Dioecesis Dalminiensis; Croatian: Duvanjska biskupija) was a Latin rite particular church of the Catholic Church that was established in the 14th century with a seat in present-day Tomislavgrad in Bosnia and Herzegovina. It was a suffragan diocese of the Archdiocese of Split, and during the 17th century of the Archdiocese of Dubrovnik. The diocese consisted of four parishes: Roško Polje, Duvno, Posušje and Rama.

The diocese was established under the patronage of the Šubić family. The seat of the diocese was in the former fortress of Rog, located in present-day Roško Polje near Tomislavgrad, and the cathedral church was the Church of St. John the Baptist. Due to the Ottoman incursions in the diocese from the 1460s to the final conquest of the diocese in the 1480s, the bishops of Duvno resided on the territory of the Archdiocese of Split. Vid of Hvar, who ruled the diocese until 1507, was the last bishop active in the diocese until 1551. Until that time, the diocese was nominally held by titular bishops, followed by a line of the so-called missionary bishops, the first of whom was Daniel Vocatius. The missionary bishops resided in the Ottoman territory, in the Franciscan friary in Rama, which belonged to the diocese of Duvno, but after its destruction by the Ottomans in the late 17th century, they continued to administer the diocese from the Archdiocese of Split, while they were helped by the Illyrian priests and the Bosnian Franciscans who lived under the Ottomans. From 1610 to 1645, the diocese was again ruled only nominally by titular bishops, and after that, by the missionary bishops and the bishops of the neighbouring Makarska. From 1800, the title of the bishop of Duno was only titular until 1881, when the diocese was incorporated into the newly established Diocese of Mostar-Duvno after Austria-Hungary occupied the Ottoman-held Bosnia and Herzegovina.

== History ==
=== Background ===
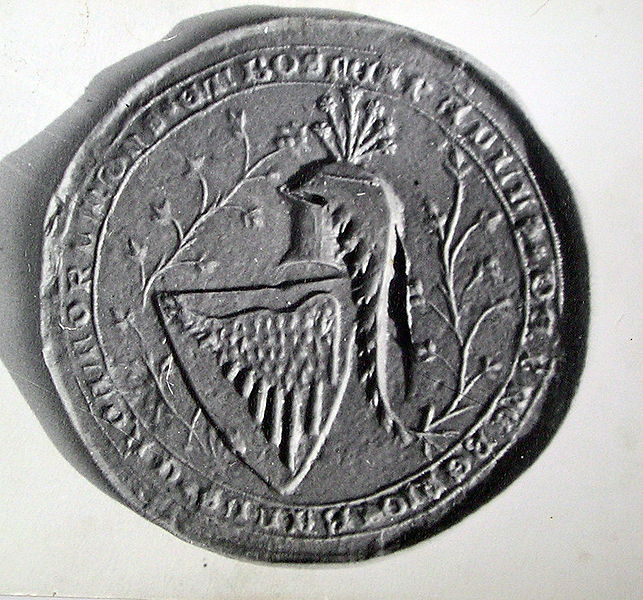
The coat of arms of the Šubić family that influenced the establishment of the diocese

In the 14th century, when the Diocese of Duvno was established, the Archbishop of Split had a right to establish dioceses in his metropolitan area and appoint and consecrate the bishops. The exact year of the establishment of the Diocese of Duvno remains unknown. It is not mentioned before the rule of Paul I Šubić of Bribir, and it was most probably established by the Archbishop of Split Petar, O.F.M., who served as the archbishop from 1297 to 1324. The establishment of the Diocese of Duvno, as well as the dioceses Šibenik and Makarska was initiated for the political goals of the Šubić family, the dukes of Bribir. Namely, in this way, they would secure support among the clergy.

On the verge of the 13th to 14th century, the sons of Paul Šubić – Mladen, George and Paul, after securing the territory of the eastern Adriatic hinterland, adopted the title of a "Duke of Tropolje, Livno and Cetina". They intended to extend their territories further east towards the hinterland and establish the highest church organisation there.

At the time, the circumstances within the Papacy allowed the Šubić's to implement their church policy. The Papacy at the time, faced complex issues, including the dispute with Philip IV of France over the taxation of clergy and expropriation of the church's property and especially the property previously owned by the Knights Templar. This resulted in moving the papal seat to Avignon. The Avignon popes used the church institutions mainly to collect taxes to build their new residence in Avignon. As the Šubić's were able to issue their own currency, they were wealthy and good taxpayers, so they were allowed to pursue their church policies.

The rival to the Šubić family were the Kotromanićs who ruled the Banate of Bosnia. For example, Stephen II Kotromanić, although himself a Latin Catholic, supported the heterodox Bosnian Church, which in return, supported the claims of the Kotromanić family. The Bosnian Church, protected by the Kotromanić family, managed to expand outside of its Bosnian core to Zachlumia, Tropolje and the area between Neretva and Cetina. Thus, the Šubić's were seen as the fighters for the orthodoxy against the heterodox Bosnian Church. Thus, Pope John XXII calls Mladen II Šubić to remove "the enemies of the Christ's Cross" from Bosnia. The Šubić's mission to appropriate the members of the Bosnian Church to the Catholic Church gained them a favour among the Bosnian Franciscan missionaries. They constructed Franciscan friaries and appointed Franciscans as bishops in the dioceses under their control.

=== Establishment and early years ===
Škegro writes that the Diocese of Duvno was established somewhere around the establishment of the Diocese of Makarska, if not at the same time. Franciscan historian Dominik Mandić puts the establishment of the Diocese of Duvno between 1274 and 1297. Other authors, like Karlo Jurišić, Slavko Kovačić and Krunoslav Draganović, also put the establishment of the Diocese of Duvno at the end of the 13th century and the beginning of the 14th century respectively.

The cathedral church of the Diocese of Duvno was the Church of St. John the Baptist, located within the fortress of Rog, in present-day Roško Polje. John the Baptist was the Šubićs' patron saint, along with Mary, mother of Jesus, so they consecrated to them the churches and monasteries that they would build.

The collapse of the Šubićs' power in Duvno after the Kotromanićs takeover in 1322, resulted badly for Madius of Duvno, who complained to Pope Clement VI that he had to leave his seat because of the "evil of the people". Many authors, like Ivo Bagarić, Slavko Kovačić, and Damir Kabrić consider that the "evil of the people" referred to the resistance of the local populace to the Church authorities over the taxation, which would be impossible under the rule of the Šubićs. The fall of Duvno also enabled the spread of the Bosnian Church, and at the same time, a significant Vlach population arrived on the territory of Duvno. The Vlachs were especially averse to the Church authorities, and often, in order to avoid taxation, they would also change their confession. The proof that the Diocese of Duvno suffered a hard time after Šubićs fall is a testimony of an anonymous Spanish travel writer who in the second quarter of the 14th century wrote that the Catholics are almost non-existent in Bosnia.

Ever since its establishment, the Diocese of Duvno suffered from poverty and the personal insecurity of the bishops. In 1345, Madius' successor John de Leoncello was freed from paying a regular fee paid by the diocesan bishops upon their appointment because of poverty. For those reasons, the bishops of Duvno were forced to live outside their diocese and lived mostly on the territory of the Archdiocese of Split, where, at the same time, they held high posts. On the other hand, they would suffer from serious poverty. For example, Bishop Stephen, who resided in the Diocese of Duvno, was forced to beg due to poor conditions, and later, as a high-ranking church dignitary in Split, he acted as a missionary for his Diocese of Duvno.

One of the canons of the Diocese of Duvno, Nicholas, became a bishop in his own right in present-day Albania in 1472.

=== Ottoman conquest ===
During the Ottoman conquest of Herzegovina in the 1470s, the bishops of Duvno, who only occasionally resided in the fortress of Rog, were forced to leave their cathedral church. The Diocese of Duvno thus practically became a missionary territory. Finally, in 1477, the fortress of Rog, as well as the wider area of Duvno, became an Ottoman nahiyah in the Sanjak of Herzegovina.

During the Ottoman rule, in order to survive, the bishops of Duvno relied on Franciscans and their own families respectively. During their missionary activity, the bishops had no official residence on the territory of the diocese and held the religious services around the ruins of the destructed church objects.

During the reign of bishop Pavao Posilović, in 1655, the Franciscan friary of St. Peter in present-day Prozor-Rama was mentioned as the cathedral church of the Diocese of Duvno. The Friary of St. Peter served to Posilović as a temporary refuge.

=== Apostolic Vicariate of Bosnia ===
The territory that remained in the Ottoman Empire after the Austro-Turkish War (1716–1718) and signing of the Treaty of Passarowitz in 1718, became part of the Apostolic Vicariate of Bosnia, by the decree of Pope Clement XII of 1735. By this decree, the Holy See harmonised the ecclesiastical situation with the political one. It was also in accordance with the Ottoman policy that the clergy serving in its territory should be Ottoman subjects. A special ecclesiastical province under Ottoman Empire was promoted by the Bosnian Franciscans with the help of the Bishop of Zadar Vicko Zmajević. The initiative was accepted by the Propaganda, which asked the Pope to appoint the new bishop for the Catholics in the Ottoman Bosnia, which would be appointed from the ranks of the Bosnian Franciscans. The territory encompassed by the Vicariate of Bosnia included the territory of the dioceses of Duvno and Bosnia, parts of the dioceses of Makarska, and the Archdiocese of Split that fell under the Ottoman rule. The first apostolic vicar was Mato Divelić. The appointment of a special bishop of Duvno was, at the time, impossible, because during the Morean War (1684–1699) the regions of Duvno and Rama were devastated, while the Friary of St. Peter that served as a temporary cathedral was destroyed by the Ottomans in 1687. Further, the Catholics of Duvno largely left the region during the Ottoman–Venetian War (1714–1718) and settled in the neighbouring regions under the Venetian control.

== Episcopal ordinaries ==
Bishops
Administrators
Nominees

Bishops of Duvno
Bishop	Term	Notes	Refs
Jean de Huy	1298/1311 – Unknown	Titular bishop. His episcopacy is disputed.	
Madius	1298/1311 – 1344	Benedictine or Franciscan; resigned from office.	
John of Léoncel	20 June 1345 – 1355	French. Previously a member of the Cisteranian and later Benedictine abbey in France.	
Stjepan	1355 – 1371	He administered the Diocese of Makarska after its bishop Valentine resigned in 1344 until his return in 1356.	
Matej	c. 1375 – c. 1392	He was the bishop of Makarska and administered the Diocese of Duvno from 1371 to 1392.	
Juraj Imoćanin	12 October 1392 – 21 October 1412	He was translated to the Diocese of Hvar in 1412 but continued to administer the Diocese of Duvno until he died in 1428.	
Petar Tilikonis	1429 – 1439	He was the bishop of Makarska and administered the Diocese of Duvno from 1429 to 1439.	
Jeronim Trogiranin	22 April 1439 – 1459	Resigned due to political difficulties.	
Nikola Cimelić	2 January 1460 – c. 1470	He fled the diocese due to the Ottoman incursions in the territory and preached for the Crusade against the Ottomans in Friuli and Istria; returned to Zadar, where he died.	
Sede vacante	c. 1470 – 2 October 1489		
Vid Hvaranin	2 October 1489 – Before 26 June 1507	He used the title "the bishop of Duvno, and all of Hum". Besides Duvno, Vid of Hvar exercised his jurisdiction from Cetina to the west to Popovo Polje in the east. He was the last residential bishop of Duvno and the last native bishop until Daniel Vocatius in 1551.	
Tomás de Córdoba	26 June 1507 – 1514	Spanish. Although appointed as the residential bishop, he was only a titular bishop due to the Ottoman conquest of the diocese.	
Álvaro Salas Sánchez	8 August 1514 – 12 October 1520	Spanish. Titular bishop.	
Andrés Clemente de Torrecremata	14 January 1521 – Unknown	Spanish. Although appointed as the residential bishop, he was only a titular bishop due to the Ottoman conquest of the diocese.	
Nicolaus Bogantius	14 July 1536 – 1551	Hungarian. Titular bishop.	
Daniel Vocatius	2 December 1551 – 9 May 1575	From Split. The first bishop to be active on the territory of the diocese the first native bishop since Vid of Hvar and the first of the so-called missionary bishops of Duvno. He fled the Ottomans to Spain in 1570 and was translated to the Diocese of Muro in 1575.	
Nikola Ugrinović	1570 – 1604	From Poljica. He was a titular bishop of Smederevo, who administered the Diocese of Duvno in the name of Bishop Daniel Vocatius and continued to administer the diocese until his murder by the Ottomans in 1604.	
György Zalatnaky	Unknown – Before 1600	Only nominated for a brief period, but never consecrated as the bishop of Duvno, appointed and installed as the bishop of Pécs instead.	
Alfons de Requesens	30 August 1610 – 11 August 1625	Spanish. Titular bishop. Formerly a provincial of the Austrian Franciscan Province. He was freed from residing in Duvno until the liberation from the Ottomans. At the same time, he served as a vicar of the Austrian Imperial Army. He was later translated to Barbastro in Spain in 1625.	
Vincenzo Zucconi	30 August 1627 – 1635	From Mantua. Titular bishop. Formerly a provost of a church in Prague.	
Marijan Maravić	31 July 1645 – 24 July 1647	He was formerly the provincial of the Franciscan Province of Bosnia. Translated to the Diocese of Bosnia in 1647, but continued to administer the Diocese of Duvno until 1655.	
Pavao Posilović	24 May 1655 – 28 January 1657	Formerly the bishop of Skradin. He was also a prelate of an interim apostolic vicariate established for the territory between the rivers Sava and Drava from 1648 to 1650. After being appointed the bishop of Duvno, Posilović continued to administer the diocese of Skradin. He died after being imprisoned by the Ottomans in Livno.	
Michael Jahnn	14 January 1658 – 5 June 1663	German. Reported that the territory of the Diocese was in ruins and empty since the population moved to the region of Sinj due to a war between the Ottomans and the Venetians. Notwithstanding the insistence of Rome to settle on the territory of the Diocese of Duvno, he was reluctant to live on a territory controlled by the Ottomans and settled in Senj and refused to oblige. For this reason, he was suspended.	
Marijan Lišnjić	20 January 1667 – 5 March 1686	Apostolic administrator and the bishop of Makarska.	
Nikola Bijanković	10 May 1699 – 10 August 1730	Apostolic administrator and the bishop of Makarska.	
Stjepan Blašković	Summer 1732 – 17 November 1776	Apostolic administrator and the bishop of Makarska. In a dispute with the apostolic vicars of Bosnia (established in 1735), bishop Mate Delivić, OFM and Pavao Dragičević, OFM, over the jurisdiction in Duvno.	
Silvestro Scarani	4 January 1801 – 13 March 1807	Italian. Titular Bishop. He was an auxiliary bishop of Ostia–Velletri.	
Francesco Maria Biordi	23 September 1816 – 7 October 1817	Italian. Titular Bishop.	
Joseph Chrysostomus Pauer	2 August 1818 – 3 May 1824	Austrian. Titular Bishop. Military vicar of Austria, later served as the bishop of Sankt Pölten.	
Franciszek Pawłowski	27 May 1827 – 6 February 1836	Polish. Titular Bishop. He was an auxiliary Bishop of Warszawa and the bishop coadjutor of Płock, and later the bishop of Płock.	
Johann Aloys Hoffmann	14 June 1835 – 24 April 1848	Austrian. Titular Bishop. He was an auxiliary bishop of Salzburg.	
Balthasar Schitter	28 July 1850 – 19 October 1868	Austrian. Titular Bishop. He was an auxiliary bishop of Salzburg.	
Josip Mihalović	1868 – 1870	Hungarian. Only nominated, never appointed or installed; became the archbishop of Zagreb in 1870.	
Dominic Manucy	7 September 1874 – 18 January 1884	American. Titular Bishop. The apostolic vicar of Brownsville, later the bishop of Mobile and again the apostolic vicar of Brownville and the titular bishop of Maroneia.	
Cyryl Lubowidzki	24 March 1884 – 2 August 1897	Polish. Titular Bishop. He was an auxiliary bishop of Kyiv–Černihiv, later the bishop of Lutsk and Zytomierz and the apostolic administrator of Kamyanets-Podilsky.	

== See also ==
- Catholic Church in Bosnia and Herzegovina

== Source and External links ==
- GCatholic Mostar-Duvno, with incumbent bio links
