= Nicolaus Bogantius =

Hungarian prelate

Nicolaus Bogantius (also spelled Beganicio; Hungarian: Bogantius Miklós; Croatian: Nikola Bogantius; died 1551) was a Hungarian prelate of the Catholic Church who served as an auxiliary bishop in the Diocese of Transylvania and a titular bishop of Duvno from 1536 to his death in 1551. He spent most of his tenure in Rome as a representative of John Zápolya, the contested king of Hungary and an Ottoman subject.

== Career ==
Bogantius was an archdeacon in Pécs and a secretary and a diplomat of John Zápolya, the contested king of Hungary who controlled the eastern realms as an Ottoman subject. In 1536, Zápolya sent him to Rome to get approval for the appointment of János Statileo as the Bishop of Transylvania. While in Rome, Bogantius used the opportunity. On the proposal of Cardinal Niccolò Gaddi, he was appointed the titular bishop of Duvno with the ability to exercise his episcopacy in the Diocese of Transylvania as an auxiliary bishop without an obligation to reside in the Diocese of Duvno, with an income of 200 ducats, including from his titular diocese. He managed to secure his appointment before Statileo's. Despite the high income, Bogantius failed to attain the papal bull on his appointment, for which he had to pay the traditional fee, even six months after the appointment. The term for receiving the bull was extended for an additional six months, and he eventually obtained the bull.

From 1536, Bogantius spent his time in Rome in the papal courts as the representative of Zápolya and the Transylvanian clergy. After Zápolya died in 1540, Pope Paul III appointed him the assistant to the papal vicar for Rome, a duty he exercised from 1541 to 1544. He died in Rome in 1551.

== Footnotes ==
Catholic Church titles
Preceded by Andrés Clemente de Torrecremata	Bishop of Duvno; 1536–1551	Succeeded by Daniel Vocatius
