= Maravich =

Maravich is a surname of Serbian origin.

== Notable people ==
- Pete Maravich, American basketball player
- Press Maravich, American basketball player and coach

== See also ==
- Maravić
