= Andrés Clemente de Torrecremata =

Spanish prelate

Andrés Clemente de Torrecremata T.O.R. (also spelled Torquemada or Turrecremata; Croatian: Andrija Klement de Turrecremata) was a Spanish prelate of the Catholic Church who served as a titular bishop of Duvno from 1521. The date of the end of his episcopate and death is unknown.

== Biography ==
De Torrecremata was born in Torquemada, Palencia. Before his episcopal appointment, de Torrecremata, a member of the Third Order Regular of St. Francis, was a guardian of the St. Mary the Mother of God friary and a theology professor in Córdoba. Pope Leo X appointed de Torrecremata as the bishop of Duvno on 29 December 1520, with an order that he must relocate to the diocese, reside there and that he mustn't exercise his episcopal duties outside the diocese. The Pope, aware that the diocese was under the Ottoman occupation and that the bishop could not reside there, used the appointment to incentivise the resistance of the Christian populace. For the same reason, he allowed de Torrecremata to continue to administer the friary of St. Mary and sustain himself from the friary's income up to 24 ducats. He was consecrated on 14 January 1521 in Rome by Vincenzo de Andreis, the bishop emeritus of Otočac as the principal consecrator and Pietro de Andreis, the bishop of Otočac and Pietro Prisco Guglielmucci, the bishop of Lavello as the principal co-consecrators. From 1520 to 1522, de Torrecremata served as an emissary of the bishop of Funchal for the area of eastern Portugal.

== Footnotes ==
Catholic Church titles
Preceded by Álvaro Salas Sánchez	Bishop of Duvno; 1521–Unknown	Succeeded by Nicolaus Bogantius
