= György Zalatnaky =

Hungarian prelate

The Most Reverend György Zalatnaky
- Bishop of Pécs
- Native name: Juraj Slatinski
- Church: Catholic Church
- Diocese: Pécs
- Appointed: 20 December 1600
- Installed: 13 May 1601
- Predecessor: Miklós Mikáczy
- Successor: Petar Domitrović

Orders
- Consecration: 13 May 1601 by János Kutasy

Personal details
- Born: Zagreb, Croatia, Habsburg Empire
- Died: 29 December 1605 Kraków, Poland–Lithuania
- Denomination: Catholic

György Zalatnaky (Croatian: Juraj Slatinski; died 29 December 1605) was a Hungarian prelate of the Catholic Church who served as the bishop of Pécs from 1601 until his death in 1605. Previously, Zalatnaky served as a canon in Zagreb and Esztergom, as well as vicar general of Eger. He was also appointed the titular bishop of Duvno and the residential bishop of Vác, but never took office.

== Biography ==
The Slatinski or Zalatnaky family stems from Stari Slatinik in present-day eastern Croatia. In the early 16th century, the family moved to Zagreb. György's father, Matija, was a landowner, a lawyer and a judge in Zagreb, notable for representing the nobles from Turopolje. Matija married a noblewoman from the Grubaševački family from Hrvatsko Zagorje. They had two sons, György and Baltazar and four daughters, Margareta, Ana, Suzana and Magdalena.

Zalatnaky was ordained as a Catholic priest and became a canon of the Diocese of Zagreb. From 1592 he served as a canon for the Archdiocese of Esztergom. He was appointed the titular bishop of Duvno. From 1598, he served as vicar general of the Diocese of Eger. On 16 April 1598, Zalatnaky was nominated as the bishop of Vác. However, already on 10 June 1598, before he was installed in Vác, Zalatnaky was nominated as the bishop of Pécs and received papal approval on 20 December 1600. Dominik Mandić writes that even though Zalatnaky was appointed as the titular bishop of Duvno, he was never consecrated as such until his appointment in Pécs. Zalatnaky's consecration took place on 13 May 1601, while his principal consecrator was Archbishop János Kutasy of Esztergom.

During the Bocskai uprising in 1604, the debate over the significance of the crown played a crucial role. The uprising, originating in Košice in present-day Slovakia, Stephen Bocskai's hometown, saw the forcible takeover of the Cathedral of St. Elizabeth from Lutherans by Catholics, supported by King Rudolf II. Zalatnaky participated in the takeover, for which Bocskai imprisoned him in his castle in Nagykereki. He was treated well in prison. Bocskai informed the Polish king Sigismund III Vasa about the imprisonment, and was released on Sigismund's request. To thank the King for his intercession, Zalatnaky went to Kraków; however, while there, he soon got ill and died. With Zalatnaky's death, the male line of his family died out.

== Footnotes ==
Catholic Church titles
Preceded by Miklós Mikáczy	Bishop of Pécs; 1601–1605	Succeeded by Petar Domitrović
