= Daniel Vocatius =

16th-century Croatian Catholic bishop of Duvno and Muro Lucano

- Bishop of Muro Lucano
- Church: Catholic Church
- Diocese: Muro Lucano
- Appointed: 9 May 1575
- In office: 1575–early 1577
- Predecessor: Giulio Ricci
- Successor: Vincenzo Petrolini
- Other post: Possible administrator of the Diocese of Makarska
- Previous post: Bishop of Duvno (1551–1575)

Orders
- Consecration: Late 1551 or early 1552 by Bernardino Maffei
- Rank: Bishop

Personal details
- Born: Split, Republic of Venice
- Died: Early 1577
- Denomination: Catholic

Daniel Vocatius (also known as Danijel Vocatius, Vocensis, Vocacensis or Vocacio; died early 1577) was a Croatian Franciscan prelate of the Catholic Church who served as bishop of Duvno from 1551 to 1575 and bishop of Muro Lucano from 1575 until his death. Originally from Split, he was appointed to Duvno by Pope Julius III following a petition from local Catholics. Unlike several preceding bishops, who held the see while residing elsewhere, Vocatius attempted to exercise episcopal jurisdiction within its Ottoman-controlled territory.

His episcopate was marked by disputes with the Bosnian Franciscans, persecution by Ottoman authorities and periods of residence outside his diocese. He was imprisoned during a pastoral visitation and subsequently ransomed. After leaving the region, he obtained ecclesiastical support in the Kingdom of Naples and was transferred by Pope Gregory XIII to Muro Lucano on 9 May 1575. His appointment was supported in part by reports that he had suffered under Ottoman rule and helped secure the freedom of hundreds of Christian captives.

== Origins and Franciscan affiliation ==
Vocatius was a Franciscan friar from Split, then part of the Republic of Venice. The forms Vocatius, Vocensis and Vocacensis appear in later accounts of his ecclesiastical career, but his family name is uncertain. The Franciscan historian Karlo Jurišić proposed that he belonged to the Glasnović family, while Ratko Perić suggested Glasnić or Glasnović. Marijan Žugaj advanced a different hypothesis, associating him with the Vukčić-Hrvatinić family and suggesting that he was a descendant of Stjepan Vukčić Kosača. None of these identifications has been conclusively established.

His affiliation with the Conventual branch of the Franciscans is also uncertain. Žugaj identified Vocatius as a Conventual Franciscan because contemporary records show he owned a house in Split, which he considered inconsistent with the poverty regulations governing Observant Franciscans. Ante Škegro reported this interpretation without establishing Vocatius's specific Franciscan affiliation.

== Appointment to Duvno ==
At the request of Grgur Lučić and Pavao Vuković, two local nobles, their sons and members of Duvno's Catholic population, Julius III appointed Vocatius bishop of Duvno on 2 December 1551. The bishopric had lacked effective resident episcopal administration for decades. Škegro believed the Bosnian Franciscans encouraged the petition, as they maintained the Catholic pastoral network in the area. Žugaj further suggested that Pavao Vuković was related to Vocatius, but their alleged kinship remains unproven.

Vocatius was consecrated bishop in Rome by Cardinal Bernardino Maffei, probably in late 1551 or early 1552. The exact date is not established. The ecclesiastical historian Daniele Farlati also associated him with the administration of the neighbouring Diocese of Makarska, although the circumstances and formal basis of any additional appointment remain uncertain.

Soon after his appointment, Vocatius attempted to establish a body of diocesan clergy under his direct authority. According to Perić, he brought four Glagolitic priests to serve in the diocese, but the Bosnian Franciscans objected because they regarded the territory as belonging to their established pastoral jurisdiction. The priests were consequently sent away. The dispute illustrated the difficulties facing an appointed bishop seeking to exercise authority over communities traditionally served by Franciscan friars.

== Disputes and activities in Dalmatia ==
In September 1553, Vocatius was in Naples, where Franciscan provincial Angelo Aversani wrote a recommendation to Ferdinand I, seeking help securing a transfer to a safer diocese. The proposal reflected the difficulties of administering Duvno under Ottoman rule, but no transfer resulted at that time.

In 1557, Pope Paul IV ordered an investigation into allegations concerning Vocatius's relations with the Ottoman authorities and his treatment of the Bosnian Franciscans. The inquiry was entrusted to Frano Rosano and Bernardin Stanković, canons of the Archdiocese of Split. According to Mandić and Škegro, the investigation did not substantiate accusations that would discredit the bishop.

Vocatius was documented in Split in 1558, when he conveyed a house to his sister Katarina to settle a debt of 400 ducats owed to her husband, Jakov de Sasso of Ancona. He had purchased the property on 15 March 1551, before becoming a bishop. The transaction subsequently formed part of Žugaj's argument that Vocatius belonged to the Conventual Franciscans.

== Ottoman persecution and withdrawal ==
During a pastoral visitation to Catholics in Herzegovina, traditionally dated to 1563, Vocatius came under the pursuit of Ottoman authorities. Accounts collected by Mandić and Škegro describe his movements through Mostar and Ljubuški, his capture near Korčula, and his imprisonment at Vrgorac. Franciscan friars eventually released him after paying a ransom. The chronology of the pursuit and captivity is not entirely consistent in the historical literature; Škegro also refers to the persecution he suffered in 1565.

According to later Franciscan accounts, Ottoman authorities destroyed the Franciscan friaries in Mostar and Ljubuški during the pursuit. The historians Vjeran Kursar and Daniel Patafta discuss these events in the wider context of relations between the Bosnian Franciscans and Ottoman officials.

After these events, Vocatius increasingly administered the diocesan territory from outside Ottoman-controlled lands. He spent time in Split and Omiš. Mandić considered that he may have continued occasional pastoral visits until the outbreak of the Ottoman–Venetian War in 1570; Škegro instead emphasised the obstacles to further visits after his imprisonment.

Vocatius also delegated pastoral responsibilities to Nikola Ugrinović, titular bishop of Smederevo, who resided in Poljica. The date on which this arrangement began is disputed. Žugaj proposed 1566, whereas other historians placed it later; its extent and duration cannot be established precisely.

== Departure and transfer to Muro Lucano ==
Around 1570, Vocatius left the region and travelled to Naples, then to Spain. He obtained support from the Spanish monarchy, which also ruled the Kingdom of Naples. On the recommendation of the Neapolitan royal court, Philip II of Spain granted him revenues from a monastery in the kingdom for his maintenance.

In 1575, Cardinal Giulio Antonio Santorio raised objections before Gregory XIII to Vocatius's prolonged absence from his diocese. Nevertheless, the papal consistory of 9 May 1575 approved his transfer to the vacant Diocese of Muro Lucano in Basilicata, southern Italy, following the transfer of Giulio Ricci to Gravina.

The consistorial discussion referred to Vocatius's suffering under the Ottoman authorities and stated that he had helped free as many as 500 Christians from captivity, including people from Dalmatia and neighbouring regions, who subsequently reached the Kingdom of Naples. These reports were among the considerations presented in favour of his transfer. The document does not establish the precise number of people released or the circumstances of each release.

Vocatius remained bishop of Muro Lucano until his death in early 1577. On 25 February 1577, Vincenzo Petrolini succeeded him. The exact date and place of Vocatius's death have not been securely established.

== Footnotes ==
Catholic Church titles
Preceded by Nicolaus Bogantius	Bishop of Duvno; 1551–1575	Succeeded by Nikola Ugrinović (administrator)
Preceded by Giulio Ricci	Bishop of Muro Lucano; 1575–1577	Succeeded by Vincenzo Petrolini
