= Vincenzo Petrolini =

Italian Roman Catholic prelate

Most Reverend Vincenzo Petrolini
- Bishop of Muro Lucano
- Church: Catholic Church
- Diocese: Diocese of Muro Lucano
- In office: 1577–1606
- Predecessor: Daniele Vocazio
- Successor: Tommaso Confetti

Personal details
- Died: 1606 Muro Lucano, Italy

Vincenzo Petrolini (died 1606) was a Roman Catholic prelate who served as Bishop of Muro Lucano (1577–1606).

== Biography ==
On 25 February 1577, Vincenzo Petrolini was appointed during the papacy of Pope Gregory XIII as Bishop of Muro Lucano. He served as Bishop of Muro Lucano until his death in 1606.

== External links and additional sources ==
- Cheney, David M. "Diocese of Muro Lucano". Catholic-Hierarchy.org. (for Chronology of Bishops) ^{[self-published]}
- Chow, Gabriel. "Diocese of Muro Lucano (Italy)". GCatholic.org. (for Chronology of Bishops) ^{[self-published]}

Catholic Church titles
Preceded by Daniele Vocazio	Bishop of Muro Lucano; 1575–1577	Succeeded by Tommaso Confetti
