= Bartul Kačić =

Croatian Catholic prelate and bishop (1572-1645)

Bartul Kačić OFM (1572 – 25 June 1645) was a Croatian prelate of the Catholic Church who served as the bishop of Makarska from 1615 to his death in 1645, at the same time, he administered the Diocese of Duvno.

== Early life ==
Born in Brist in present-day southern Croatia, Bartul Kačić stems from the Kačić family. Pejo Ćošković writes that he probably started his education at the Zaostrog friary, where he also spent his novitiate after joining the Franciscan Order. There, Ćošković suggests, he probably finished elementary humanist education. He belonged to the Franciscan Province of Bosnia, which sent him for further studies in autumn 1600 to Naples at the Franciscan General College. After finishing his studies in 1604, he worked as a theology professor at Santa Maria La Nova in Naples. In 1613, he moved to Zagreb, where he started to lecture at the newly established Franciscan theological studies. During his stay in Zagreb, he visited the court of King Matthias of whom he asked to reestablish the dioceses of Makarska and Duvno and on the request of his fellow Franciscans, gained an order which forbade the uskoks to attack the Croatian coast.

== Episcopate ==
During his short stay in České Budějovice in 1614, Kačić received the news that King Matthias had nominated him for the office of the bishop of Makarska. Pope Paul V appointed Kačić the bishop of Makarska on 15 June 1615, thus reestablishing the Diocese of Makarska. He was consecrated in San Francesco della Vigna in Venice, on 26 July 1615, with Alessandro della Torre as his principal consecrator. Ćošković suggests that the installation ceremony was held around Christmas that year in the Makarska friary. The territory of the Diocese of Makarska covered the parts of Herzegovina west of the Neretva river as well, at the time under the Ottoman control. Thus, Kačić became the first bishop after a long period to visit Catholics under Ottoman control. For example, in 1624 and 1625, he made two chrismian visits there.

As a bishop, Kačić resided mainly in the Zaostrog friary, from where he visited his episcopal seat in Makarska. In the last years of his life, he suffered from gout. On 2 July 1644 he asked the Congregation for the Propagation of the Faith to assign him a bishop coadjutor with succession rights, proposing his nephew and a fellow Franciscan from Makarska Petar Kačić for the office. Sensing imminent war between Venice and the Ottoman Empire, he left his diocese and moved in Sućuraj in the eastern part of the isle Hvar controlled by Venice. He died in his house in Sućuraj and is buried in the chapel of St. George he built as a family mausoleum. Kačić died before his request for the appointment of a bishop coadjutor was approved by the pope. Nevertheless, the pope appointed Petar Kačić his successor on 12 September 1645.

=== Administrator of Duvno ===
After the death of its administrator Nikola Ugrinović, the titular bishop of Smederevo, in 1604, the Diocese of Duvno was officially administered by the bishops of Bosnia who received a general jurisdiction over Catholics in the Ottoman Bosnia and Herzegovina. The office of the bishop of Duvno was only nominal at the time. Since the bishops of Bosnia were overextended due to a large number of Catholics, they delegated the administration over the Diocese of Duvno, at first to vicar general Mijo Runović, and then to Kačić after he became the bishop of Makarska in 1615.

Kačić's administrative jurisdiction over Duvno extended to Central Bosnia. He visited the diocese at least two times. On 6 July 1626, he reported to the Congregation for the Propagation of the Faith that he visited the parishes under the care of the St. Peter's Friary in Rama with the approval of the bishop of Bosnia. He made two other reports on the diocese in 1630 and 1635.

== Footnotes ==
Catholic Church titles
Preceded by Petar Tilikonis	Bishop of Makarska; 1615–1645	Succeeded by Petar Kačić
