= Marijan Maravić =

Bosnian-Herzegovinian prelate

Marijan Maravić OFM (c. 1598 – 14 September 1660) was a Bosnian-Herzegovinian prelate of the Catholic Church who served as the bishop of Bosnia from 1647 to his death in 1660. He previously served as the bishop of Duvno from 1645 to his appointment to the Diocese of Bosnia in 1647 but continued to administer the diocese until 1655.

== Early life ==
Maravić was born to an affluent Catholic family in Olovo in Ottoman Bosnia and Herzegovina. It is unknown where he was educated. From 1634 to 1637, he was a guardian of the Franciscan friary in Kraljeva Sutjeska. From 1637, he served as a guardian of the Franciscan friary in Kreševo. In mid-August 1637, at the request of Bey Sinanović from Sarajevo, he was elected the provincial of the Franciscan Province of Bosnia. This put him at odds with the Province's council and its custos, Marin Ibrišimović. On 24 June 1640, he was succeeded by Martin Nikolić, after which Maravić retreated to the Franciscan friary in Olovo. At first, Maravić was nominated for the bishop of Bosnia.

Around Christmas 1640, the bishop of Bosnia, Toma Mrnjavić suffered a stroke, while his duties were carried out by Jeronim Lučić, the bishop of Drivast, who died on 15 January 1643. Thus, in August 1643, at the request of the Congregation for the Propagation of the Faith, the leadership of the Franciscan Province of Bosnia proposed Maravić with three other Franciscans as a bishop coadjutor to Mrnjavić. On 8 September 1644, Mrnjavić requested that Maravić be appointed his bishop coadjutor. Mrnjavić died at the end of December of that year. Apostolic visitor Giacomo Boncarpi proposed Provincial Petar Lipanović and Maravić for the post, and on 18 March only Maravić. On 25 April 1645, the Congregation requested more information on Lipanović and Maravić, and the general commissioner of the Franciscan Order gave a more favourable opinion of Maravić. Thus, on 19 June 1945, the Congregation suggested to the Pope to appoint Maravić as the bishop of Bosnia or another diocese in the region.

== Episcopate ==
Influenced by the Jesuit circles in Vienna, which opposed Maravić's appointment as the bishop of Bosnia and preferred Ibrišimović, the Imperial court in Vienna, which had the right to nominate the bishop of Bosnia, obstructed Maravić's appointment. To avoid the danger of leaving the Ottoman Bosnia and Herzegovina without a bishop, on 31 July 1645, Pope Innocent X appointed Maravić the bishop of Duvno, while the care of the Diocese of Bosnia was given to him with a special papal brief. The Pope granted him a stipend from the diocese's revenues, as well as 200 scudo annually. He was consecrated on 10 December 1645 in Dubrovnik with Krizostom Antić, the bishop of Trebinje as his principal consecrator, and Vicko Buće and Pavao Gradić as principal co-consecrators. He was appointed primarily to care for the Catholics in Bosnia and Herzegovina. Maravić never lived on the territory of the Diocese of Duvno, instead living in the Franciscan friary in Olovo.

Still, the Holy See lobbied through its nuncio in Vienna to appoint Maravić as the bishop of Bosnia, especially through Philipp von Mansfeld, the Imperial army commander in Hungary and later the chancellor of Hungary. The Jesuits and the Emperor's confessor opposed their efforts and lobbied for Ibrišimović. As Maravić was mainly interested in the Diocese of Bosnia, he managed, with the help of von Mansfeld, to be nominated by Ferdinand III as Mrnavić's successor on 4 September 1646. His opponent, Ibrišimović, was nominated bishop of Budva and was a candidate for administrator of the Diocese of Smederevo. The Congregation supported Maravić's nomination on 17 June 1647 and entrusted him with other dioceses he administered. The Pope confirmed the Congregation's proposal on 15 July 1647 and, with a special brief from 24 July 1647, translated Maravić from Duvno to Bosnia, simultaneously appointing him the administrator of Duvno. According to the Congregation's proposal, confirmed by the Pope, Maravić administered the Diocese of Duvno until 24 May 1655, when Pavao Posilović, the bishop of Skradin, was appointed its bishop.

Maravić's episcopacy coincided with the Cretan War (1645–1669) between the Republic of Venice and the Ottoman Empire, which involved a large area between the island of Crete in the Aegean Sea and Zadar in Dalmatia. During the war, the eastern Adriatic hinterland was affected, especially the dioceses of Makarska and Duvno, from which the Venitians removed the Christian population. There are instances of plunder of Catholics by the Venetians to achieve this goal. The Diocese of Skradin almost disappeared. For this reason, Posilović, still the bishop of Skradin, fled to the Franciscan friary in Rama, from where Maravić tried to remove him. Unlike Maravić, Posilović gained the sympathies of the Bosnian Franciscans and the populace of the Diocese of Duvno, which requested his appointment as the bishop of their diocese. For this reason, the Congregation for the Propagation of the Faith began questioning Maravić's administration of Duvno after receiving a formal request from the Catholics of Duvno, sent in November 1652 by the Franciscans from Rama. In April 1654, the Congregation entrusted the Diocese of Duvno to Posilović, whom Pope Alexander VII translated from Skradin to Duvno in May 1655.

During his episcopate, Maravić spent much time in dispute with other Church prelates. Over the parishes north of the Sava, he disputed with the bishop of Smederevo and administrator of the Hungarian lands under Ottoman occupation, Ibrišimović. He disputed with Posilović over the borders in Slavonia, Rama, Duvno and Livno. With another bishop of Smederevo, Mato Benlić, and Posilović, he disputed over the administration of Slavonia and other territories. He died in Olovo.

== Footnotes ==
Catholic Church titles
Preceded by Vincenzo Zucconi	Bishop of Duvno; 1645–1647	Succeeded by Pavao Posilović
Preceded by Toma Mrnavić	Bishop of Bosnia; 1647–1660	Succeeded by Nikola Ogramić
