= Silvestro Scarani =

Italian prelate

Silvestro Scarani (13 February 1731 – 13 March 1807) was an Italian prelate of the Catholic Church who served as an auxiliary bishop of Velletri and the titular bishop of Duvno from 1801 to his death in 1807.

Scarani was ordained to the diaconate on 14 September 1800 and to the priesthood on 20 September. On 22 December 1800, he was appointed an auxiliary bishop of Velletri and the titular bishop of Duvno. He was consecrated on 4 January 1801 with Cardinal Giuseppe Maria Doria Pamphilj as the principal consecrator and Camillo Campanelli, the titular archbishop of Athens and Benedetto Sinibaldi, the titular archbishop of Ephesus. He died on 13 March 1807.

== Footnotes ==
Catholic Church titles
Preceded by Michael Jahnn	Bishop of Duvno; 1801–1807	Succeeded by Francesco Maria Biordi
