= Johann Aloys Hoffmann =

Austrian prelate

Johann Aloys Hoffmann (14 August 1780 – 24 April 1848) was an Austrian prelate of the Catholic Church who served as an auxiliary bishop of Salzburg from 1835 to his death in 1848.

Hoffmann was born in Regensburg in a poor family. His father, Leonhard Hoffmann, was a hunter. After his parents moved to Berchtesgaden, Hoffmann came to Salzburg. He devoted himself to studying theology. Hoffmann completed his theological studies in the Salzburg Priest's House (1799–1863) with excellent grades. On 4 June 1803, he was ordained a priest by Bishop Sigmund Christoph von Waldburg-Zeil-Trauchburg of Chiemsee.

Hoffmann, after barely two years of working in pastoral care in Zell am See, was entrusted with the important office of the prefecture of the Rupertine Collegium in the fall of 1805. In the summer of 1808, he was appointed court chaplain in Vienna by Prince-Archbishop Hieronymus von Colloredo of Salzburg.

After von Colloredo's death on 20 May 1812, Hoffmann was appointed consistory assessor in Salzburg at the beginning of 1813 and was promoted to the office of consistory councillor in 1820. On 25 March 1825, he was appointed cathedral capitular, then custos on 15 December 1832, and as a cathedral dean on 1 January 1844.

When Archbishop Augustin Gruber applied for the appointment of an auxiliary bishop to support him in the more laborious episcopal functions because of his persistent illness, Hoffmann was chosen for this dignity. Hoffmann was nominated by the emperor and confirmed on 6 April 1835 by Pope Gregory XVI, as the titular bishop of Duvno and auxiliary bishop of Salzburg. He was consecrated on 14 Jun 1835 in Salzburg Cathedral by Bishop Gregorius Thomas Ziegler of Linz. In 1841, he was appointed vicar general of the archdiocese by Prince Archbishop Friedrich Schwarzenberg.

Hoffmann did not enjoy good health. For a long time, he had an incurable breast disease. Over the years, the attacks of the disease increased, and he succumbed to it on 24 April 1848 at the age of 68. He was buried on 27 April 1848 in the Gabriel Chapel in Sebastian's Cemetery, where a simple memorial stone marks his resting place.

== Footnotes ==
Catholic Church titles
Preceded by Franciszek Pawłowski	Bishop of Duvno; 1835–1848	Succeeded by Balthasar Schitter
