= Ilija Maravić =

Serbian politician

Ilija Maravić (Serbian Cyrillic: Илија Маравић; born 23 April 1962) is a politician in Serbia. He has served in the Assembly of Vojvodina since 2016 as a member of the Serbian Progressive Party.

== Private career ==
Maravić has a master's degree from the Faculty of Economics in Subotica. He worked with Novi Sad's tax administration from 1993 to 2003 and in Subotica's finance department from 2003 to 2012.

== Politician ==
Maravić appeared in the second position on the Progressive Party's electoral list for the Subotica city assembly in the 2012 Serbian local elections and was elected when the list won eight mandates. The Progressives initially served in opposition. Maravić became president (i.e., speaker) of the assembly on 21 March 2014 and served in this role until the assembly's term ended in 2016.

He also received the 197th position on the Progressive Party's Let's Get Serbia Moving list in the 2012 Serbian parliamentary election, which was held concurrently with the 2012 local elections. The list won seventy-three mandates, and he was not returned.

=== Provincial politics ===
Maravić was awarded the fifteenth position on the Progressive Party's list for the 2016 Vojvodina provincial election and was elected to the provincial assembly when the list won a majority victory with sixty-three out of 120 seats. He received the same list position in the 2020 provincial election and was re-elected when the list won an increased majority with seventy-six seats. He is a member of the assembly committee on budget and finance and the committee on establishing equal authenticity of provincial legislation in the languages in official use.
