= Aunt Anna's =

Restaurant information
- Location: Merano, South Tyrol, Italy

Aunt Anna's was an inn in Merano, a town in northern Italy, that was often used as a safe house and stop for SS members, Nazi perpetrators, and war criminals making their escape during the years immediately following the end of World War II. For example, Reinhard Kops, a member of the German espionage network, used the inn and stated that Emil Gelny, the SS doctor chiefly responsible for the euthanasia murders in the mental institutions of Gugging and Mauer-Öhling, had also reached this destination.

Nazi flight in the post-war years centred on Italy, a "highway for war criminals" (Reichsautobahn für Kriegsverbrecher), and South Tyrol in particular - a "natural hub for members of SS and business circles to reunite and forge connections between Germany, Italy, Spain and Argentina that would secure their escape". The German-speaking population of South Tyrol maintained strong ties with German ethno-nationalism, and it was the first German-language region on the route used by Nazi war criminals to be freed from Allied military government controls, by the end of 1945. (Eichmann used the escape route via the Alto Adige to Genoa in 1950, by which time knowledge of this escape route was widespread in SS circles - having reached Sterzing, he moved to the Franciscan monastery in the capital of South Tyrol, Bolzano).

== See also ==
- Ratlines (World War II)
