= Giovanni Giacomo Coleti =

Italian historian and philologist

Giovanni Giacomo Coleti or Coletti (2 May 1734 – 15 August 1827) was an Italian historian and philologist.

He was born in Venice. As a Jesuit, he studied in Piacenza and Bologna, having taught (from 1768) on the Jesuit college in Padua, where he collaborated with Daniele Farlati. After Farlati's death, Coleti continued to work on Illyricum sacrum which was left incomplete, from volumes V (1775) to IX. He also completed and published Illyrian martyrology (Martyrologium Illyricum, 1819). He also published several biographies and spiritual works.

He died in Venice.
