= Illyricum sacrum =

Books on Catholic Church history in Southeast Europe

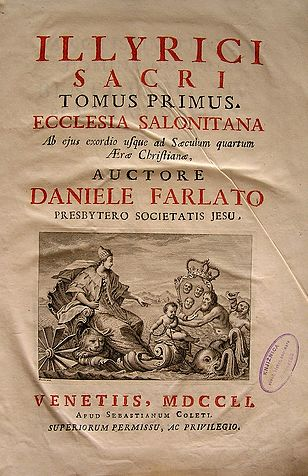
First volume, 1751 edition, Venice (author: Daniele Farlati)

Illyricum sacrum is a multi-volume historical work written in Latin dealing with history of the Catholic Church in Southeastern Europe. The work was published in eight volumes from 1751 to 1819, with the ninth tome printed from 1902 to 1919 as an appendix to Frane Bulić's Bulletino di archeologia e storia dalmata.

The first five volumes (issued 1751–1775) were authored by Daniele Farlati; volumes 6 (1800) and 7 (1817) were coauthored by Giovanni Giacomo Coleti, who also published the last volume in 1819.
