= Gradac, Posušje =

Gradac
- Village
- Location within Bosnia and Herzegovina
- Coordinates: 43°25′37″N 17°22′46″E
- Country: Bosnia and Herzegovina
- Entity: Federation of Bosnia and Herzegovina
- Canton: West Herzegovina Canton
- Municipality: Posušje

Area
  - Total: 13.76 km^{2} (5.31 sq mi)

Population (2013)
  - Total: 801
  - Density: 58.2/km^{2} (151/sq mi)
- Time zone: UTC+1 (CET)
  - Summer (DST): UTC+2 (CEST)

Gradac is a village in the municipality of Posušje in West Herzegovina Canton, the Federation of Bosnia and Herzegovina, Bosnia and Herzegovina.

== Demographics ==
According to the 2013 census, its population was 801.

Ethnicity in 2013
Ethnicity	Number	Percentage
Croats	799	99.8%
other/undeclared	2	0.2%
Total	801	100%

== Notable people ==
- Borna Sosa, Croatian footballer (parents originating from Gradac)

== Bibliography ==
- Ethnicity/National Affiliation, Religion and Mother Tongue (PDF). Sarajevo: Agency for Statistics of Bosnia and Herzegovina. 2019.
