= Roman Catholic Diocese of Skradin =

The Diocese of Skradin or Scardona (Latin: Dioecesis Scardonensis) is an episcopal titular see and former Roman Catholic bishopric with see in Skradin, central Dalmatia (coastal Croatia).

== History ==
It was established in 1126, on the territory of the suppressed Roman Catholic Diocese of Alba Maritima, as a suffragan of the Roman Catholic Archdiocese of Salona.

Its cathedral episcopal see was the Cathedral 'Porođenja Blažene Djevice Marije' of the Nativity of the Blessed Virgin Mary, which still stands in Skradin.

The diocese was suppressed in 1828 by papal bull Locum Beati Petri, when its territory was merged into the long-existing Roman Catholic Diocese of Šibenik, a suffragan of the Metropolitan Archdiocese of Split.

Yet there later existed another Coadjutor Bishop of Skradin between 1878 and 1881, Francesco Lönhart.

== Episcopal ordinaries ==
- Bishop Lampridio (1160? – 1171?)
- Michele (1179? – 1199?)
- Bartolomeo (1200 – 1222?), later Bishop of Nona (also in Croatia) (1222? – ?)
- Bishop Niccolò (1229? – ?)
- Bartolomeo, Friars Minor (O.F.M.) (1240 – 1247)
- Giovanni, Dominican Order (O.P.) (1248? – 1265?)
- Andrea, O.P. (1270? – ?)
- Galvano, O.P. (1282? – 1284?)
- Niccolò (1285? – 1293?)
- Damiano (1300? – 1308?)
- Niccolò (1315 – ?)
- Paolo Draskovich (1320? – death 1320)
- Andrea Muscolo (1326.07.07 – death 1350?)
- Giovanni (1350.11.03 – ?)
- Michele, O.P. (1356.06.15 – death 1388)
- Francesco (1388 – death 1408?), previously Bishop of Korcula (? – 1388)
- Pietro, Augustinians (O.E.S.A.) (1410.07.30 – 1420.01.15), later Bishop of Castro del Lazio (Italy, 1420.01.15 – ?)
- George of Imotski (1420.01.15 – 1423), previously Bishop of Duvno (Bosnia and Herzegovina) (1406? – 1412.10.21), Bishop of Hvar (Croatia) (1412.10.21 – 1420.01.15); later again Bishop of Hvar (1423 – 1428)
- Niccolò da Spalato (1426.04.08 – death 1428)

... (yet incomplete)

== Titular bishopric ==
It 1933, the diocese was nominally restored as a Latin titular see of the lowest (episcopal) rank, which has repeatedly -with interruptions- been assigned :

- Cândido Lorenzo González, a Mercederian (O. de M.) (1969.12.05 – 1978.05.26)
- Anthony Michael Pilla (1979.06.30 – 1980.11.13)
- Jude Saint-Antoine, Auxiliary Bishop emeritus of Montréal (Canada) (1981.03.20 – 2023.12.10)
- Andrei Znoska, Auxiliary Bishop of Pinsk (2024.07.19 – ...)
