= Daniele Farlati =

Italian historian

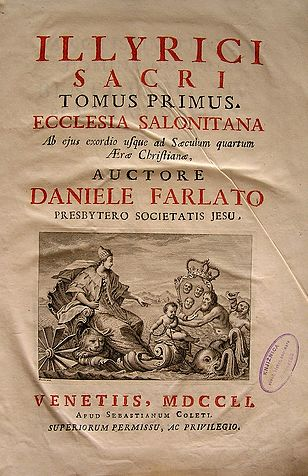
Illyricum Sacrum, tome I

Daniele Farlati (22 February 1690 – 25 April 1773) was an ecclesiastical historian.

== Biography ==
Farlati was born in San Daniele del Friuli in the present Italian province of Udine. After having studied in Gorizia he entered, in 1707, the Society of Jesus in Bologna. He was for five years teacher of classics at the Jesuit college in Padua, and then went to Rome, where he completed his theological studies, was ordained priest, in 1722, and was again sent to Padua, to assist Filippo Riceputi in his historical labours.

Riceputi intended to write the ecclesiastical history of Illyricum, and in 1720 had issued, at Padua, a prospectus of this enterprise. For twenty years they both searched in all the libraries and archives of ancient Illyria for the material for their work; the matter they collected filled three hundred manuscript volumes. In 1712, just as two of the larger divisions, the martyrology of Illyria and the life of Pietro I Orseolo, were about completed, Riceputi died. Thus Farlati was left alone to work into presentable shape the prodigious amount of material collected. As co-labourer he chose Giovanni Giacomo Coleti. The first volume of Illyricum Sacrum appeared in Venice, in 1751; it contained the history of the Church in Salona up to the fourth century. Three further volumes appeared in rapid succession; while the fifth was in press Farlati died. His assistant Coleti finished the fifth volume, which appeared in 1775, and issued three more, of which the last was completed in 1818. The whole work fills eight folio volumes.
