= Dominik Mandić =

Dominik Mandić (2 December 1889 – 23 August 1973) was a Herzegovinian Croat Franciscan and historian.

== Biography ==
Mandić was born in Lise near Široki Brijeg in Herzegovina. He completed his primary education in Široki Brijeg, where he attended the famous Franciscan high school, but graduated from the last two years in Mostar. He studied theology at Fribourg and obtained his PhD in church history. When he returned to Mostar, he became a teacher of religion in the Mostar state high school. The Franciscan Province of Herzegovina elected him as their head.

In the Kingdom of Serbs, Croats and Slovenes (established in 1918), Mandić was a member and a supporter of the pro-Yugoslav Croatian Popular Party (HPS). However, the dominant political party in Herzegovina at the time was Stjepan Radić's Croatian Peasant Party (HSS). The majority of the Herzegovinian Franciscans supported the HSS, while the minority supported the HPS. During the 1927 general election, the HPS got only one seat (won by Stjepan Barić). After the assassination of Stjepan Radić and the leaders of the HSS in the National Assembly in Belgrade, and Barić's support for the Belgrade government of Anton Korošec after the assassination, led to the disintegration of the HPS. Mandić, unlike other HPS members, supported Barić's stay in the government, for which he was decorated with the Order of Saint Sava 2nd class by King Alexander I. The assassination led to a political crisis, which was the reason why on 6 January 1929, Alexander I proclaimed a dictatorship. Mandić repeatedly congratulated Alexander and was once again decorated with the Order of the Yugoslav Crown 4th Class.

In the 1930s Mandić was amongst the senior Franciscans who supported Yugoslavia, while younger ones became proponents of Croatian independence. The HSS, now under the leadership of Vladko Maček, also became pro-Yugoslav but supported Croatian autonomy. Mandić, along with Krešimir Pandžić and Leo Petrović became its strong supporter.

=== World War II ===
In 1939, Mandić was appointed a member of the central administration of the Franciscan Order in Rome as the representative of all the Franciscan provinces in Slavic countries, and Chief Economist of the Order. He was in Rome when war broke out in the Balkans in April 1941.

Immediately after the German invasion of Yugoslavia in April 1941, and after the Yugoslav government left in exile in London, Mandić established contacts with London through his contacts in Switzerland and entered a cooperation with the British Secret Intelligence Service. With the help from other Herzegovinian Franciscans, including Leo Petrović and Bonicije Rupčić, as well as Fr. Petar Čule he gathered intel from Mostar. He also helped the Yugoslav Partisans.

Upon hearing rumors about the deportation of Serbs and Slovenes in the Independent State of Croatia (NDH), Mandić tried to influence the Government of the Independent State of Croatia to stop the deportations and to prevent clergy to participate in such doings. His relationship with the diplomatic mission of NDH was cold, and he never participated in anniversaries of the establishment of NDH organised by the diplomatic mission. Mandić saw Yugoslavia as solution for the Croatian question, and opposed the Ustaše government of NDH.

Mandić controlled San Girolamo ratline's finances. He arranged the laundering of Ustasha money likely via the Franciscans' Vatican Bank accounts to which he had access and placed the Franciscan printing presses at the disposal of the Ustasha to print false identity information for war criminals to escape from justice after the Holocaust using ratline escapes. Other priests involved in the San Girolamo ratline included Krunoslav Draganović, Dragutin Kamber, Vilim Cecelja (based in Austria) and Karlo Petranović (based in Genoa).

== Works ==
- Hrvati i Srbi, dva stara različita naroda (Croats and Serbs, Two Ancient and Different Peoples)
- Bogumilska crkva bosanskih krstjana (The Bogumil Church of Bosnian Christians)
- Crvena Hrvatska (Red Croatia)
- Državna i vjerska pripadnost sredovječne Bosne i Hercegovine (State and Religion in Medieval Bosnia and Herzegovina)
- Etnička povijest Bosne i Hercegovine (Ethnic History of Bosnia and Herzegovina)

== See also ==
- Operation Bloodstone
- Aunt Anna's, a safe house in Merano, Italy

== Notes ==
Catholic Church titles
| Preceded by Lujo Bubalo | Provincial of the Franciscan Province of Herzegovina; 1928–1934 | Succeeded by Mate Čuturić |
