= Roman Catholic Diocese of Makarska =

Coordinates: 45.8981°N 16.8433°E

The Diocese of Makarska was a Latin Catholic bishopric from 533 to 590, from 1344 to 1400 and from 1615 until its 1828 merger into the (meanwhile Metropolitan Arch)Diocese of Split-Makarska, which preserves its title.

No statistics available.

== History ==
- Established in 533 as Diocese of Makarska / Macarsca (Curiate Italian), on territory split off from the Diocese of Narona.
- Suppressed in 590, its territory being reassigned partly to the Metropolitan Archdiocese of Salona (now Split; Croatia), and partly to establish the Diocese of Duvno (Bosnia).
- Restored in 1344 as Diocese of Makarska / Macarsca (Italian), on territory (re)gained from the above Metropolitan Archdiocese of Salona
- Suppressed in 1400, merged (back) into the Metropolitan Archdiocese of Salona (Split)
- Restored in 1615 as Diocese of Makarska / Macarsca (Italian), regaining its territory from Metropolitan Archdiocese of Salona.
- In 1663 it (re)gained territory from the suppressed above Diocese of Duvno.
- In 1735 it lost territory to establish the then Apostolic Vicariate of Bosnia
- Suppressed on 1828.06.30, merged into the renamed Roman Catholic Diocese of Split–Makarska (absorbing its title and territory), which later became a Metropolitan Archbishopric.

== Episcopal ordinaries ==
(all Roman Rite)

incomplete : sixth century lacking

Suffragan Bishops of Makarska

- Valentino (1344 – 1367)
- Giacomo (1369.02.08 – ?)
- Ivan, Dominican Order (O.P.) (1373.07.18 – 1394)
- Petar Tilikonis Friars Minor (O.F.M.) (1394.09.07 – 1439)
- Bartul Kačić, O.F.M. (1615.06.15 – death 1645)
- Petar Kačić, O.F.M. (1646.06.25 – 1663)
- Marijan Lišnjić, O.F.M. (1664.02.11 – death 1686.03.03)
- Nikola Bijanković, Oratorians (C.O.) (1698.12.19 – death 1730.08.10)
- Stjepan Blašković, C.O. (1731.09.24 – death 1776.11)
- Fabijan Blašković (1777.12.15 – death 1820).

== See also ==
- List of Catholic dioceses in Croatia

== Sources and external links ==
- GCatholic - bishopric, data for all sections ^{[self-published]}
- GCatholic - former cathedral ^{[self-published]}
