= Stefano Cupilli =

Roman Catholic Archbishop of Split

Most Reverend Stefano Cupilli
- Archbishop of Split and the Primate of Croatia
- Church: Catholic Church
- In office: 1699–1719
- Predecessor: Stephanus Cosimi
- Successor: Giovanni Battista Laghi

Orders
- Consecration: 8 June 1699 by Marcantonio Barbarigo

Personal details
- Born: 19 November 1659 Venice, Italy
- Died: 11 December 1719 (age 60) Split, Croatia

Stefano Cupilli, C.R.S. (1659–1719) was a Roman Catholic prelate who served as Archbishop of Split (1708–1719) and Bishop of Trogir (1699–1708).

== Biography ==
Stefano Cupilli was born in Venice, Italy on 19 November 1659 and ordained a deacon on 12 June 1683 and ordained a priest on 11 July 1683 in the Clerks Regular of Somasca. On 1 June 1699, he was appointed during the papacy of Pope Innocent XII as Bishop of Trogir. On 8 June 1699, he was consecrated bishop by Marcantonio Barbarigo, Bishop of Corneto e Montefiascone, with Stephanus Cosimi, Archbishop of Split, and Tommaso Guzzoni, Bishop of Sora, serving as co-consecrators. On 12 March 1708, he was appointed during the papacy of Pope Clement XI as Archbishop of Split. He served as Archbishop of Split until his death on 11 December 1719.

== Episcopal succession ==
While bishop, he was the principal consecrator of:

- Matthieu Giannicio, Bishop of Scardona (1717); and the principal co-consecrator of:
- Giovanni Battista Braschi, Bishop of Sarsina (1699).

== External links and additional sources ==
- Cheney, David M. "Diocese of Trogir (Traù)". Catholic-Hierarchy.org. (for Chronology of Bishops)^{self-published}
- Chow, Gabriel. "Titular Episcopal See of Trogir". GCatholic.org. (for Chronology of Bishops)^{self-published}
- Cheney, David M. "Archdiocese of Split-Makarska". Catholic-Hierarchy.org. (for Chronology of Bishops) ^{[self-published]}
- Chow, Gabriel. "Metropolitan Archdiocese of Split-Makarska (Croatia)". GCatholic.org. (for Chronology of Bishops) ^{[self-published]}

Catholic Church titles
Preceded by Joseph Simeon Cavagnini	Bishop of Trogir; 1699–1708	Succeeded by Pietro Paolo Calorio
Preceded by Stephanus Cosimi	Archbishop of Split; 1708–1719	Succeeded by Giovanni Battista Laghi
