= Leonard Bondumier =

Italian Roman Catholic prelate

Most Reverend Leonardo Bondumier
- Archbishop of Split
- Church: Catholic Church
- Archdiocese: Archdiocese of Split
- In office: 1641–1668
- Predecessor: Sfortia Ponzoni
- Successor: Bonifazio Albani

Orders
- Consecration: 21 April 1641 by Alessandro Cesarini (iuniore)

Personal details
- Born: 1605 Venice, Italy
- Died: 1668 (age 63) Split, Croatia

Leonardo Bondumier (1605–1668) was a Roman Catholic prelate who served as Archbishop of Split (1641–1668).

== Biography ==
Leonardo Bondumier was born in Venice, Italy in 1605. On 15 April 1641, he was appointed during the papacy of Pope Urban VIII as Archbishop of Split. On 21 April 1641, he was consecrated bishop by Alessandro Cesarini (iuniore), Cardinal-Deacon of Sant'Eustachio. He served as Archbishop of Split until his death in 1668.

== External links and additional sources ==
- Cheney, David M. "Archdiocese of Split-Makarska". Catholic-Hierarchy.org. (for Chronology of Bishops) ^{[self-published]}
- Chow, Gabriel. "Metropolitan Archdiocese of Split-Makarska (Croatia)". GCatholic.org. (for Chronology of Bishops) ^{[self-published]}

Catholic Church titles
| Preceded by Sfortia Ponzoni | Archbishop of Split; 1641–1668 | Succeeded by Bonifazio Albani |
