= Giorgio Emo =

Most Reverend Giorgio Emo
- Archbishop of Corfu
- Church: Catholic Church
- Archdiocese: Archdiocese of Corfu
- In office: 1688–1705
- Predecessor: Marcantonio Barbarigo
- Successor: Augusto Antonio Zacco

Orders
- Ordination: 1 February 1688
- Consecration: 27 June 1688 by Gasparo Carpegna

Personal details
- Born: 23 June 1644 Venice, Italy
- Died: January 1705 (age 60) Corfu, Greece

Giorgio Emo (1644–1705) was a Roman Catholic prelate who served as Archbishop of Corfu (1688–1705).

== Biography ==
Giorgio Emo was born in Venice, Italy on 23 June 1644 and ordained a priest on 1 February 1688. On 14 June 1688, he was appointed during the papacy of Pope Innocent XI as Archbishop of Corfu. On 27 June 1688, he was consecrated bishop by Gasparo Carpegna, Cardinal-Priest of San Silvestro in Capite, with Stephanus Cosimi, Archbishop of Split, and Pier Antonio Capobianco, Bishop Emeritus of Lacedonia serving as co-consecrators. He served as Archbishop of Corfù until his death in January 1705.

== External links and additional sources ==
- Cheney, David M. "Archdiocese of Corfù, Zante e Cefalonia". Catholic-Hierarchy.org. (for Chronology of Bishops) ^{[self-published]}
- Chow, Gabriel. "Metropolitan Archdiocese of Corfu–Zakynthos–Kefalonia (Greece)". GCatholic.org. (for Chronology of Bishops) ^{[self-published]}

Catholic Church titles
Preceded by Marcantonio Barbarigo	Archbishop of Corfu; 1688–1705	Succeeded by Augusto Antonio Zacco
