= Zanne =

Zanne is both a given name and a surname. Notable people with the name include:

- Zanne Stapelberg (born 1977), South African musician
- Abdoul Zanne (born 2003), Ivorian footballer
- Bernardo Zanne (born 1450), Italian clergyman
