= Lawrence (archbishop of Split) =

Lawrence (Latin: Laurentinus; Croatian: Lovro Dalmatinac; died 8 July 1099) was a benedictine monk and Archbishop of Split (1060-1099). He first served as a bishop of Osor, but had to withdraw because of his reformist stances. In 1060, he was elected as archbishop of Split on the ecclesial synod.

He was an agile enforcer of church reforms of Pope Gregory VII, and as such, propagated the use of Latin in liturgy. He ordered Adam of Paris who happened to be in Split on the road from Paris to Athens to rewrite the old biographies of Saint Domnius and Saint Anastasia in a more beautiful Latin.

The church of Split is said to have been quite wealthy during his tenure, because Lawrence was "respected by the kings and dukes of Sclavonia, who donated to the church of St. Domnius many villages and estates...". He was a friend and adviser of king Zvonimir who, in turn, considered him to be his 'spiritual father'.

Lawrence, as the supreme authority in the Church in Croatia, came into possession of the Croatian crown after the outbreak of the dynastic struggle in the country, which remained in Split until his death on 8 July 1099. It is not known whom Lawrence supported in the war.

== Literature ==
- Goldstein, I., Hrvatski rani srednji vijek, Novi Liber, Zagreb, 1995. ISBN 953-6045-02-8
- Novak, Grga, Povijest Splita, knjiga prva, Škuna, Split, 2005. ISBN 953-97861-7-7
- Šišić, F., Povijest Hrvata, pregled povijesti hrvatskog naroda, 600.-1526, Marjan tisak, Split, 2004. ISBN 953-214-197-9
