= Andrija Buvina =

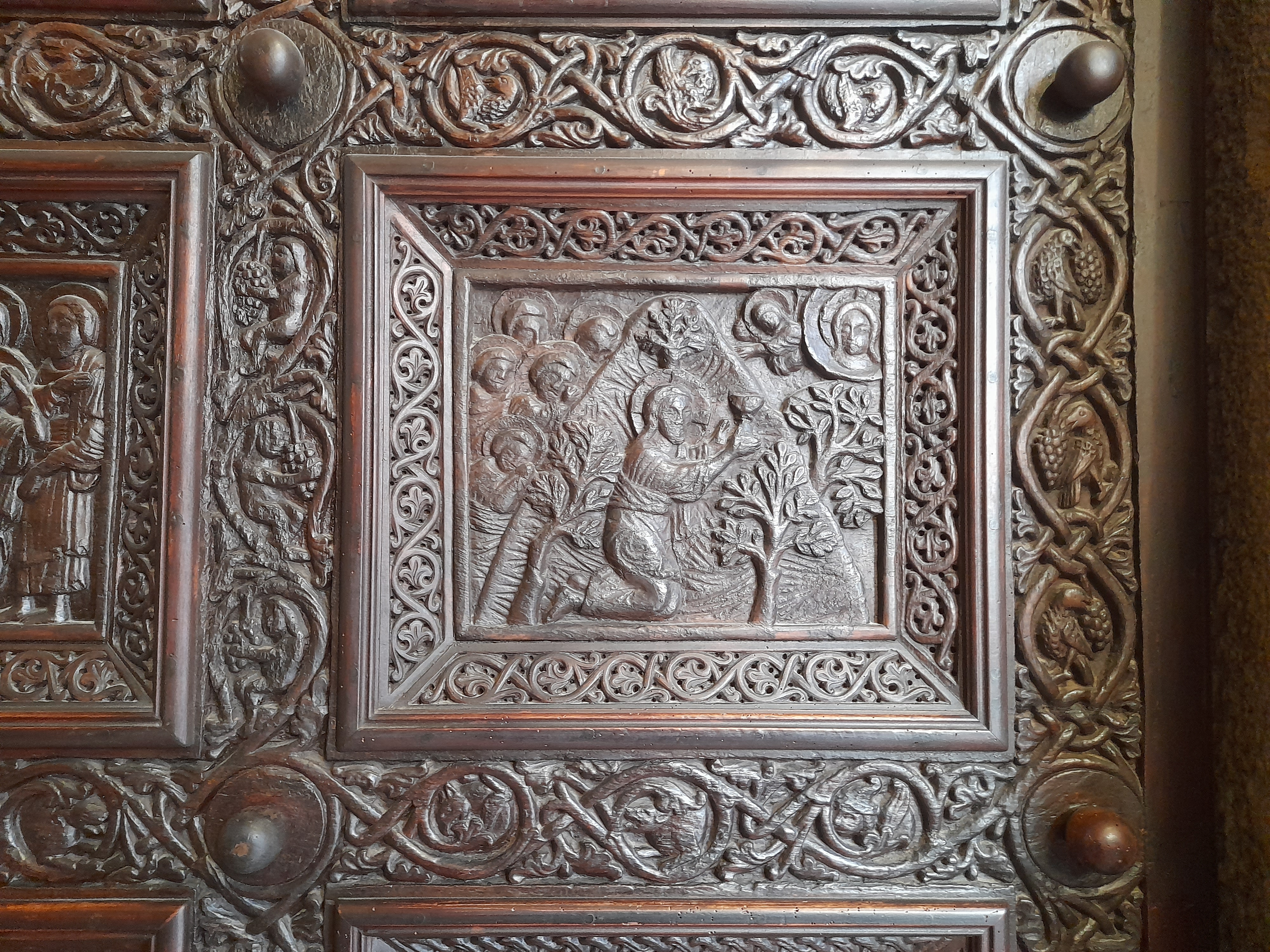

Andrea Buvina (also known as Andrija Buvina, or Andrea Guvina, Gavina or Gruvina) was a 13th-century medieval Croatian sculptor and painter. His work is commonly associated with the Romanesque period.

== Works ==
The wooden door for the Cathedral of St. Duje in Split, made by Andrija Buvina c. 1214, is the best-known work of Romanesque sculpture in Croatia. The two wings of the Buvina wooden door, which is 530 cm in height, contain 28 scenes from the life of Jesus Christ, starting with the Annunciation and ending with the Ascension, separated by the grape vine, acanthus and interlace ornaments, with small human and animal figures among the vine leaves. Buvina was also the author of a painting of Saint Christopher, probably a fresco painting in the peristyle of Diocletian's Palace in Split.
