= Raynerius of Split =

Italian monk

Saint Raynerius of Split
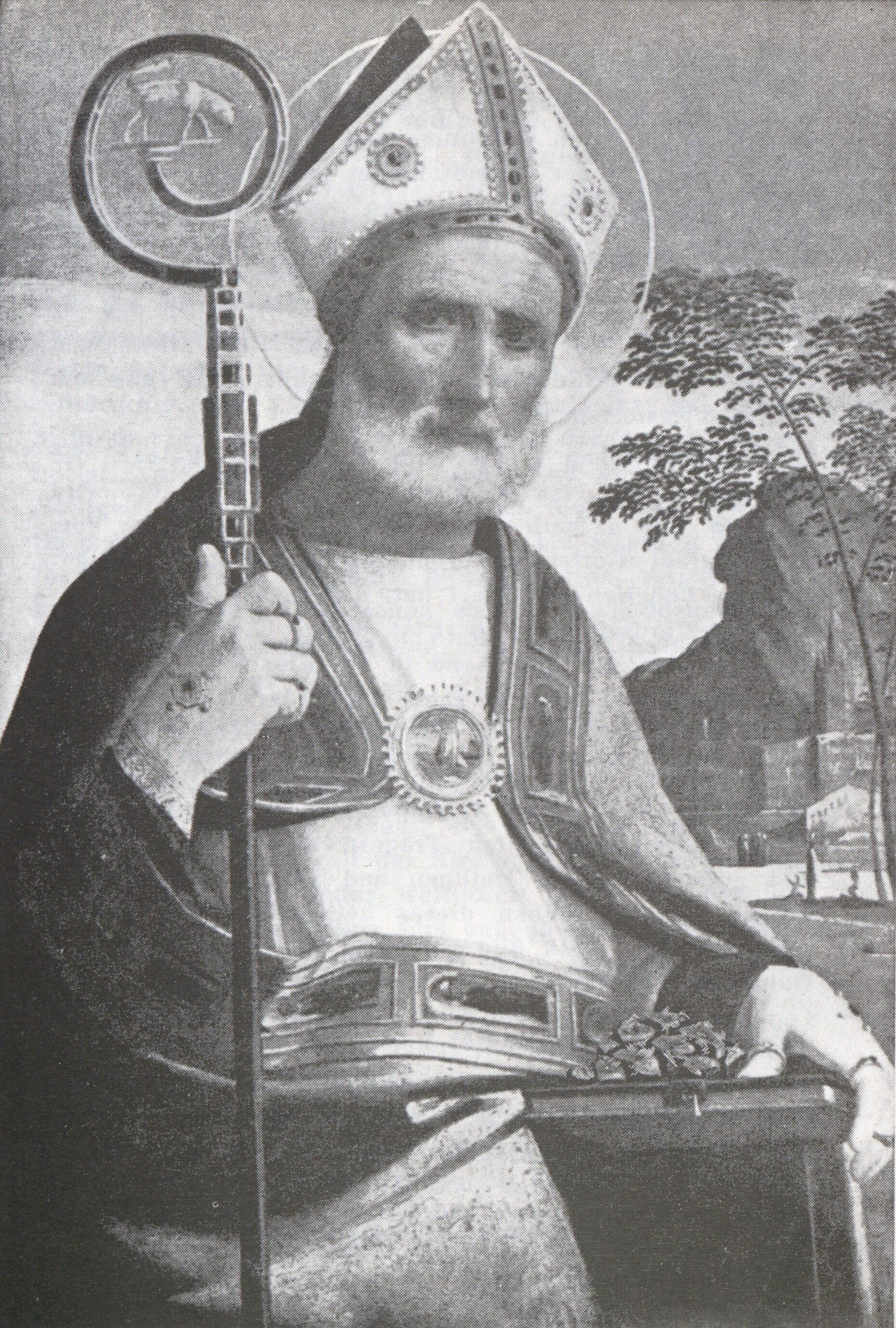

Bishop of Cagli and Archbishop of Split
- Died: 1180; Split, Croatia
- Venerated in: Roman Catholic Church
- Feast: 4 August

Raynerius of Split (died 1180) was an Italian Camaldolese monk. He became bishop of Cagli, from 1156 to 1175, and then archbishop of Split.

He was stoned to death for "defending the rights of the Church" in a dispute over land. He is a Catholic saint and his feast day is August 4.
