= Stephanus Cosimi =

Roman Catholic prelate (1629–1707)

Most Reverend Stephanus Cosimi
- Archbishop of Split
- Church: Catholic Church
- In office: 1678–1707
- Predecessor: Bonifazio Albani
- Successor: Stefano Cupilli

Orders
- Consecration: 18 September 1678 by Alessandro Crescenzi (cardinal)

Personal details
- Born: 27 September 1629 Venice, Italy
- Died: 10 May 1707 (age 77) Split, Croatia

Stephanus Cosimi, C.R.S. (Croatian: Stjepan I. Cosmi) (27 September 1629 – 10 May 1707), was a Roman Catholic prelate who served as Archbishop of Split (1678–1707).

== Biography ==
Stephanus Cosimi was born in Venice, Italy on 27 September 1629 and ordained a priest in the Ordo Clericorum Regularium a Somascha. On 5 September 1678, he was appointed during the papacy of Pope Innocent XI as Archbishop of Split. On 18 September 1678, he was consecrated bishop by Alessandro Crescenzi (cardinal), Bishop of Recanati e Loreto, with Domenico Gianuzzi, Titular Bishop of Dioclea in Phrygia, and Bartolomeo Menatti, Bishop of Lodi, serving as co-consecrators. He served as Archbishop of Split until his death on 10 May 1707.

== Episcopal succession ==
While bishop, he was the principal co-consecrator of:

- Giorgio Emo, Archbishop of Corfu (1688);
- Giovanni Vusich, Bishop of Nona (1688); and
- Stefano Cupilli, Bishop of Trogir (1699).

== External links and additional sources ==
- Cheney, David M. "Archdiocese of Split-Makarska". Catholic-Hierarchy.org. (for Chronology of Bishops) ^{[self-published]}
- Chow, Gabriel. "Metropolitan Archdiocese of Split-Makarska (Croatia)". GCatholic.org. (for Chronology of Bishops) ^{[self-published]}

Catholic Church titles
Preceded by Bonifazio Albani	Archbishop of Split; 1678–1707	Succeeded by Stefano Cupilli
