= Alvise Michiel =

Italian clergyman and bishop

- Bishop of Split
- Church: Catholic Church
- See: Bishop of Split
- Appointed: 19 July 1566
- Term ended: 25 September 1582
- Predecessor: Marco Cornaro
- Successor: Giovanni Domenico Marcot

Orders
- Consecration: 17 November 1566 (Bishop) by Giovanni Delfino

Personal details
- Born: 1513
- Died: 25 September 1582 (aged 68–69) Venezia

Alvise Michiel (Latin: Aloysius Michaelius, 1513 – 1582) was an Italian clergyman and bishop for the Archdiocese of Split.

== Biography ==
Alvise Michiel was born in 1513 to Maffio, a Venetian of noble family. He was appointed bishop of Split on 19 July 1566, and consecrated Bishop by Giovanni Delfino (bishop of Torcello) on 17 November 1566 in the church of San Michele in Isola. On 3 August 1575 he obtained the appointment of a coadjutor bishop.

In 1580 he was taken to trial charged by the Republic of Venice of embezzlement in acting as executor of a will, but the Holy See fiercely protected him, excommunicating the prosecutor and asking for a formal apology from the Republic.

Since 1575 Alvise Michiel retired to Venice, where he died on 25 September 1582.
