= Marcantonio Barbarigo =

Italian cardinal

Venerable Marcantonio Barbarigo
- Cardinal; Archbishop of Montefiascone e Corneto
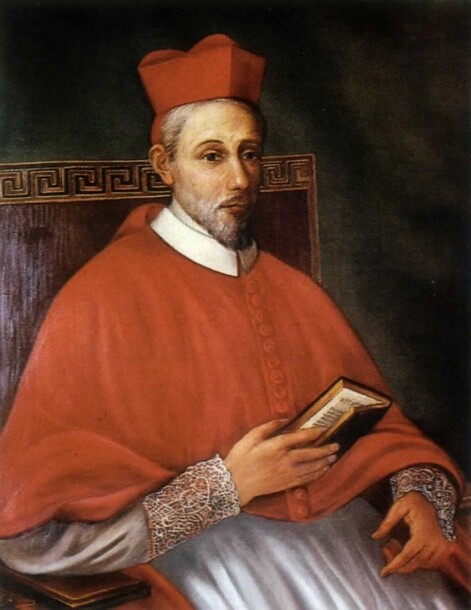
- Church: Roman Catholic Church
- See: Montefiascone e Corneto
- Appointed: 7 July 1687
- Installed: 1687
- Term ended: 26 February 1706
- Predecessor: Domenico Massimo
- Successor: Sebastiano Pompilio Bonaventura
- Other post: Cardinal-Priest of San Marco (1697–1706)
- Previous posts: Bishop of Corfu (1678–1687); Cardinal-Priest of Santa Susanna (1686–1697)

Orders
- Ordination: 1655 by Gregorio Barbarigo
- Consecration: 26 June 1678 by Gregorio Barbarigo
- Created cardinal: 2 September 1686 by Pope Innocent XI
- Rank: Cardinal-Priest

Personal details
- Born: Marcantonio Barbarigo; 6 March 1640 Venice, Republic of Venice
- Died: 26 May 1706 (aged 66) Montefiascone, Viterbo, Papal States

Marcantonio Barbarigo (6 March 1640 – 26 May 1706) was an Italian cardinal of the Roman Catholic Church. He was the founder of the Pontifical Institute of the Religious Teachers Filippini and also founded both the Religious Teachers Filippini of Montefiascone and the Augustinian Sisters of Divine Love. He was the great-uncle of Pope Clement XIII and was a relative of Gregorio Barbarigo.

In the process towards sainthood Pope Benedict XVI approved that he lived a life of heroic virtue and bestowed upon him the title of Venerable in 2007.

== Biography ==
Marcantonio Barbarigo was born on 6 March 1640 in Venice. Barbarigo studied in Padua where he earned a doctorate in both canon law and civil law. He abandoned a successful diplomatic career in order to follow his religious vocation.

=== Bishop of Corfu ===
Barbarigo was ordained to the priesthood in Padua and Pope Innocent XI later appointed him as the Bishop of Corfu in 1678. His relative Gregorio Barbarigo bestowed upon him episcopal consecration in the Roman church of Santa Maria in Vallicella on 26 June 1678 and he was granted the pallium the following month. There he established a seminary for the training of young priests. In August 1684, the Venetian fleet anchored at Corfu was stricken with cholera. Barbarigo spent his days in the hospital ministering to the sick and dying.

== Montefiascone and Corneto ==
Pope Innocent XI elevated him into the cardinalate on 2 September 1686 as the Cardinal-Priest of Santa Susanna. He was transferred to the see of Montefiascone and Corneto in 1687 with the title of Archbishop. He established an orphanage in Corneto which was subsequently named "Orfanotrofio Barbarigo" in his honor.

In 1685, Rose Venerini established a school for girls in Viterbo. Cardinal Barbarigo invited Venerini to come to his diocese to give advice on the administration of schools in the diocese and to help train teachers. From 1692 to 1694, Venerini opened ten schools in Montefiascone and the villages surrounding Lake Bolsena. The cardinal rented a house for Venerini and her school, and provided the material means; Rosa trained the teachers, and organized the schools.

When she had to return to Viterbo to attend to her first school, Venerini entrusted the Montefiascone schools and the teachers to the direction of a young woman, Lucy Filippini, whom the cardinal had entrusted with the leadership of the project in his diocese. Filippini organized the teachers of that diocese as a separate religious congregation known as the Religious Teachers Filippini.

He participated in the papal conclave of 1689 which resulted in the election of Pope Alexander VIII and also partook in the conclave of 1691 that saw the election of Pope Innocent XII. He later opted to be the Cardinal-Priest of San Marco in 1697 and partook in the papal conclave of 1700 that saw the election of Pope Clement XI.

Barbarigo died on 26 May 1706 at 10:00am in Montefiascone in the residence of the bishop. He was buried in the tomb where bishops of the see were buried but was later transferred to another church and his heart placed in the Montefiascone seminary.

== Sainthood ==
Barbarigo's spiritual writings were approved by theologians on 1 February 1939. The cause of beatification was introduced on 23 March 1941 and bestowed on him the title of Servant of God and the Positio was forwarded to the Congregation for the Causes of Saints in 2006. Pope Benedict XVI approved that he lived a life of heroic virtue and proclaimed him to be Venerable on 6 July 2007.

== Episcopal succession ==
Episcopal succession of Marcantonio Barbarigo

While bishop, he was the principal consecrator of:

- Tommaso Caracciolo, Bishop of Gerace (1687);
- Bartolomeo Rosa, Bishop of Lavello (1688);
- Domenico Morelli (bishop), Bishop of Lucera (1688);
- Alessandro Avio, Bishop of Pesaro (1688);
- Vittorio Priuli, Archbishop of Zadar (1689);
- Alberto Sebastiano Botti (Blotto), Bishop of Albenga (1689);
- Carolus de Tilly, Bishop of Acerra (1692);
- Francesco Antonio Triveri, Bishop of Andria (1692);
- Giovanni Tommaso Rovetta, Bishop of Hvar (1693);
- Innocenzo Migliavacca (Milliavacca), Bishop of Asti (1693);
- Valeriano Chierichelli, Bishop of Ferentino (1694);
- Pietro Alessandro Procaccini, Bishop of Ripatransone (1695);
- Joseph Simeon Cavagnini, Bishop of Trogir (1695);
- Vincentius degl'Atti, Bishop of Bagnoregio (1695);
- Giovanni Giuseppe Camuzzi, Bishop of Orvieto (1695);
- Andrea Ariani, Bishop of Andria (1697);
- Juan Lorenzo Ibáñez de Arilla, Bishop of Tropea (1697);
- Francesco Antonio Volturale, Bishop of Vieste (1697);
- Luigi Ruzini, Bishop of Bergamo (1698);
- Stefano Cupilli, Bishop of Trogir (1699);
- George Witham, Titular Bishop of Marcopolis and Vicar Apostolic of Midland District (1703);
- James Gordon (vicar apostolic), Titular Bishop of Nicopolis in Armenia and Coadjutor Vicar Apostolic of Scotland (1706);

and the principal co-consecrator of:

- Muzio Dandini, Bishop of Senigallia (1686);
- Filippo Tani, Bishop of Città Ducale (1686);
- Giulio Giacomo Castellani, Bishop of Cagli (1686); and
- Giovanni Alfonso Petrucci, Bishop of Belcastro (1686).

== Augustinian Sisters of Divine Love ==
Cardinal Barbarigo founded the Congregation of the Augustinian Sisters of Divine Love in Montefiasconi, Italy on 13 September 1705. The sisters run the "Casa per ferie Mater Mundi", a residence for students of the Italian /institute for Classical Studies, affiliated with the Pontificium Institutum Altioris Latinitatis.

== Books ==
- Bergamaschi, Pietro (1912). Vita del Servo di Dio Cardinale Marc'Antonio Barbarigo. Tipografia Poliglotta Vaticana, Roma. 2 vols. (in Italian)

Catholic Church titles
Preceded by Carlo Labia	Archbishop of Corfù; 1678–1687	Succeeded by Giorgio Emo
Preceded by Bernhard Gustav von Baden-Durlach	Cardinal-Priest of Santa Susanna; 1686–1697	Succeeded by Daniello Marco Delfino
Preceded by Domenico Massimo	Archbishop (Personal Title) of Corneto e Montefiascone; 1687–1706	Succeeded by Sebastiano Pompilio Bonaventura
Preceded by Gregorio Giovanni Gasparo Barbarigo	Cardinal-Priest of San Marco; 1697–1706	Succeeded by Giambattista Rubini
