= Cathedral of Saint Domnius =

Coordinates: 43°30′29″N 16°26′25″E

- Cathedral of Saint Domnius in Split
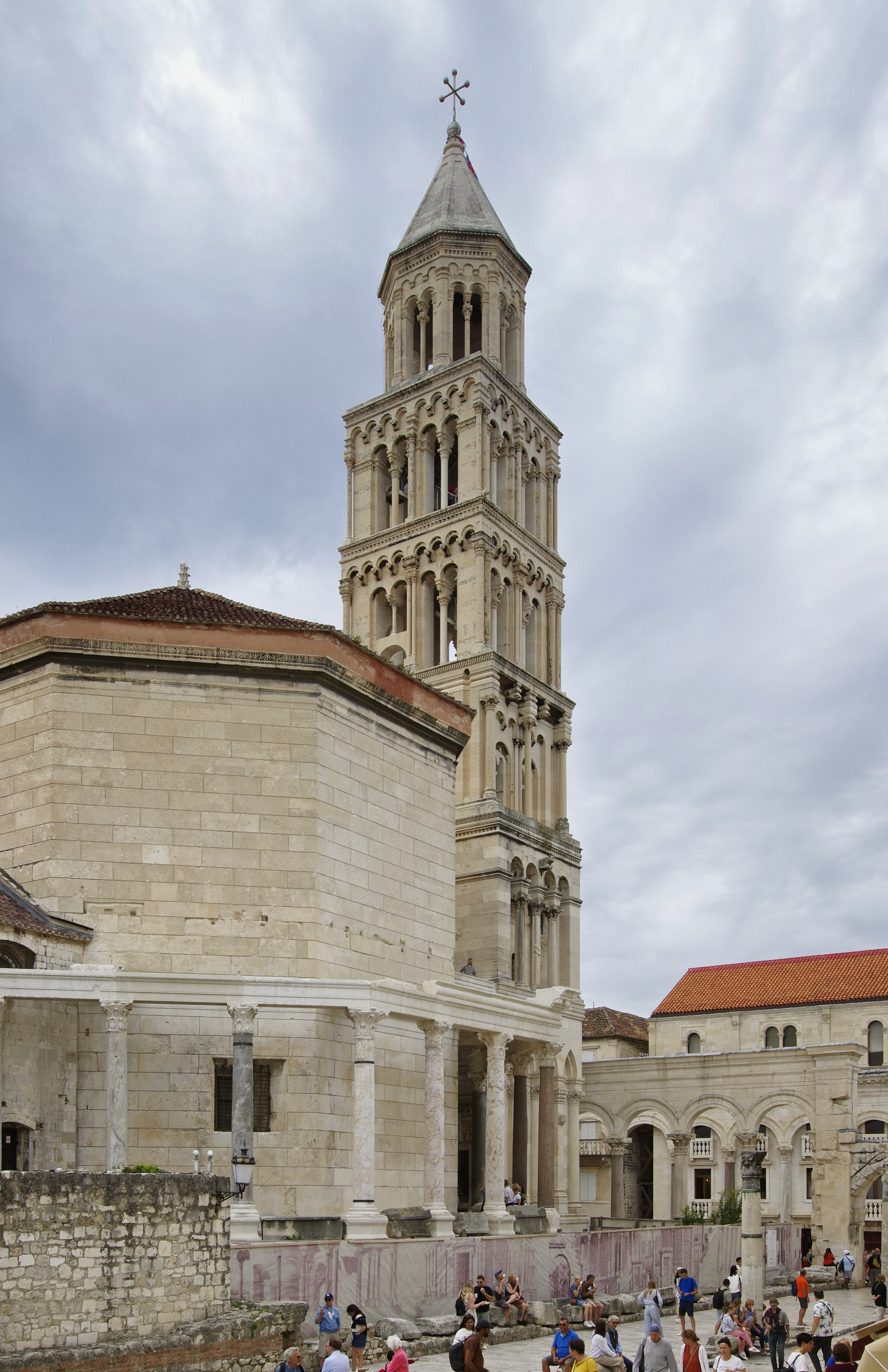
- The Cathedral of Saint Domnius
- Cathedral of Saint Domnius
- Location: Split
- Country: Croatia
- Denomination: Roman Catholicism

History
- Status: Cathedral
- Dedication: Virgin Mary and Saint Domnius

Architecture
- Functional status: Active
- Style: Ancient/Romanesque
- Years built: 4th century
- Groundbreaking: AD 305 (as Diocletian’s mausoleum)

Specifications
- Height: 57 m

Administration
- Archdiocese: Archdiocese of Split-Makarska

Clergy
- Archbishop: Zdenko Križić

The Cathedral of Saint Domnius (Croatian: Katedrala Svetog Duje), known locally as the Sveti Dujam or colloquially Sveti Duje, is the Catholic cathedral in Split, Croatia. The cathedral is the seat of the Archdiocese of Split-Makarska, currently headed by Archbishop Zdenko Križić. The Cathedral of St. Domnius is a complex of a church, formed from an Imperial Roman mausoleum, with a bell tower; strictly the church is dedicated to the Virgin Mary, and the bell tower to Saint Domnius. Together they form the Cathedral of St. Domnius.

The Cathedral of Saint Domnius, consecrated at the turn of the 7th century AD, is regarded as the oldest Catholic cathedral in the world that remains in use in its original structure, without near-complete renovation at a later date (though the bell tower dates from the 12th century). The structure itself, built in AD 305 inside of UNESCO World Heritage Site Diocletian's Palace as the Mausoleum of Diocletian, is the second oldest structure used by any Christian Cathedral. It's one of the most recognisable landmarks of Split.

== Name ==
The cathedral was named after Saint Domnius (Saint Dujam, or Saint Domnius) patron saint of Split, who was a 3rd-century Bishop of Salona. Salona was a large Roman city serving as capital of the Province of Dalmatia. Today it is located near the city of Solin in Croatia. Saint Domnius was martyred with seven other Christians in the persecutions of the Emperor Diocletian. He was born in Antioch, in modern-day Turkey, and beheaded in 304 at Salona.

== History ==
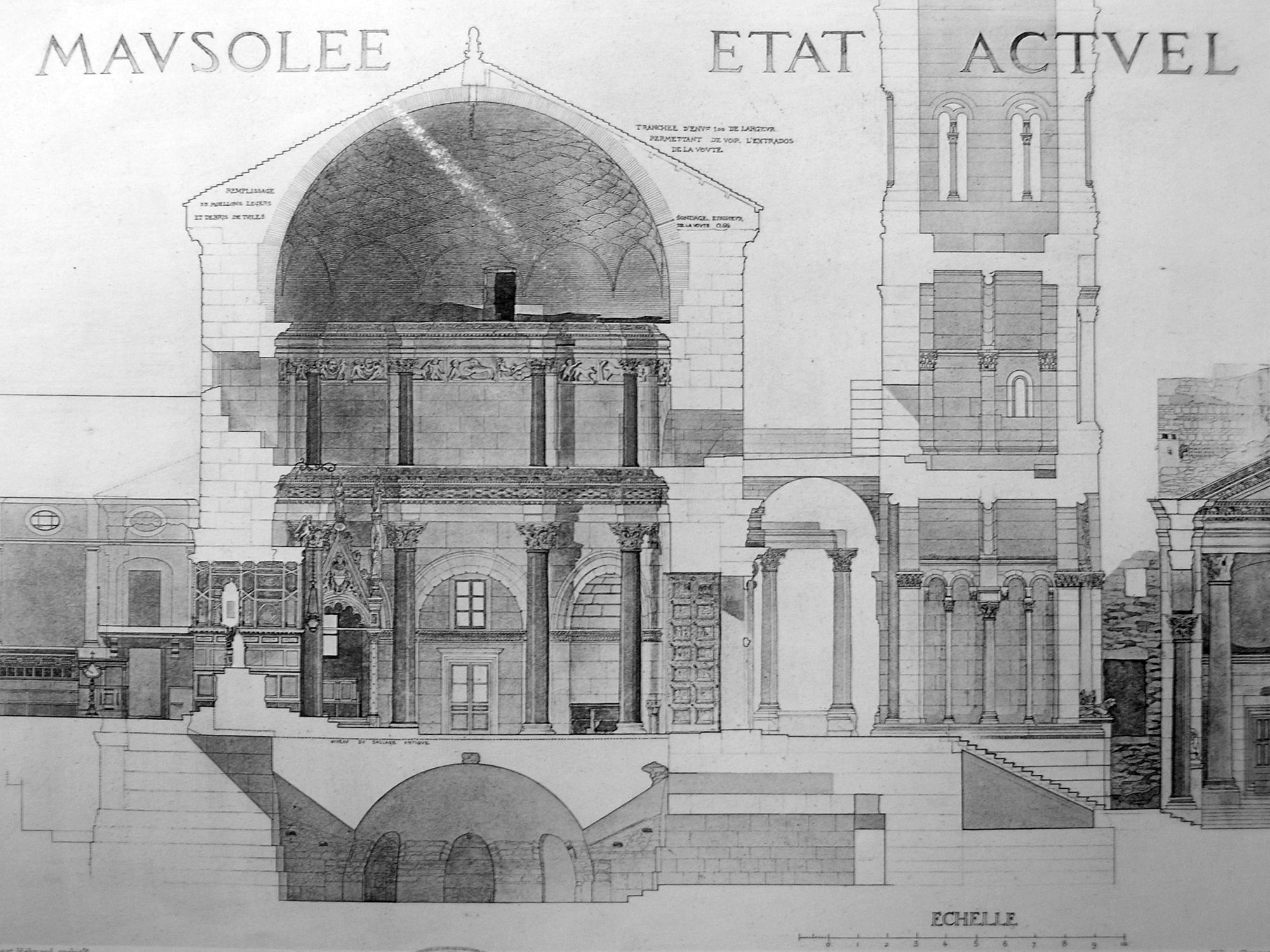
Cathedral section

When the Avars and Slavs destroyed Salona in the 7th century, part of the population fled to the nearby islands. After some time, a portion of these refugees returned to the mainland and settled within the abandoned imperial palace of Diocletian's Palace. They converted the emperor’s mausoleum into a Christian church, destroying the pagan idols as well as the sarcophagus in which the emperor had once been buried. From the ruined basilicas of Salona, they then transferred the relics of Christian martyrs whom Diocletian himself had ordered to be executed: Saint Domnius, the first bishop of Salona, and Saint Anastasius of Aquileia, a humble worker. According to the tradition recorded by the 13th-century Split chronicler Thomas the Archdeacon, these events took place during the tenure of Split’s first archbishop, John of Ravenna.

Among Europe’s cathedrals, the cathedral in Split is unique in that it occupies the oldest structure ever used as a cathedral: the mausoleum of the Roman emperor Diocletian. At the close of the second millennium, this building stands as a powerful reconciliation of pagan antiquity, Christian medieval tradition, and modern heritage. The mausoleum of an emperor once known for persecuting Christians was transformed in the mid-7th century into a cathedral, where altars with the relics of Saint Domnius and Saint Anastasius—martyrs executed in nearby Salona—were placed in positions of honor.

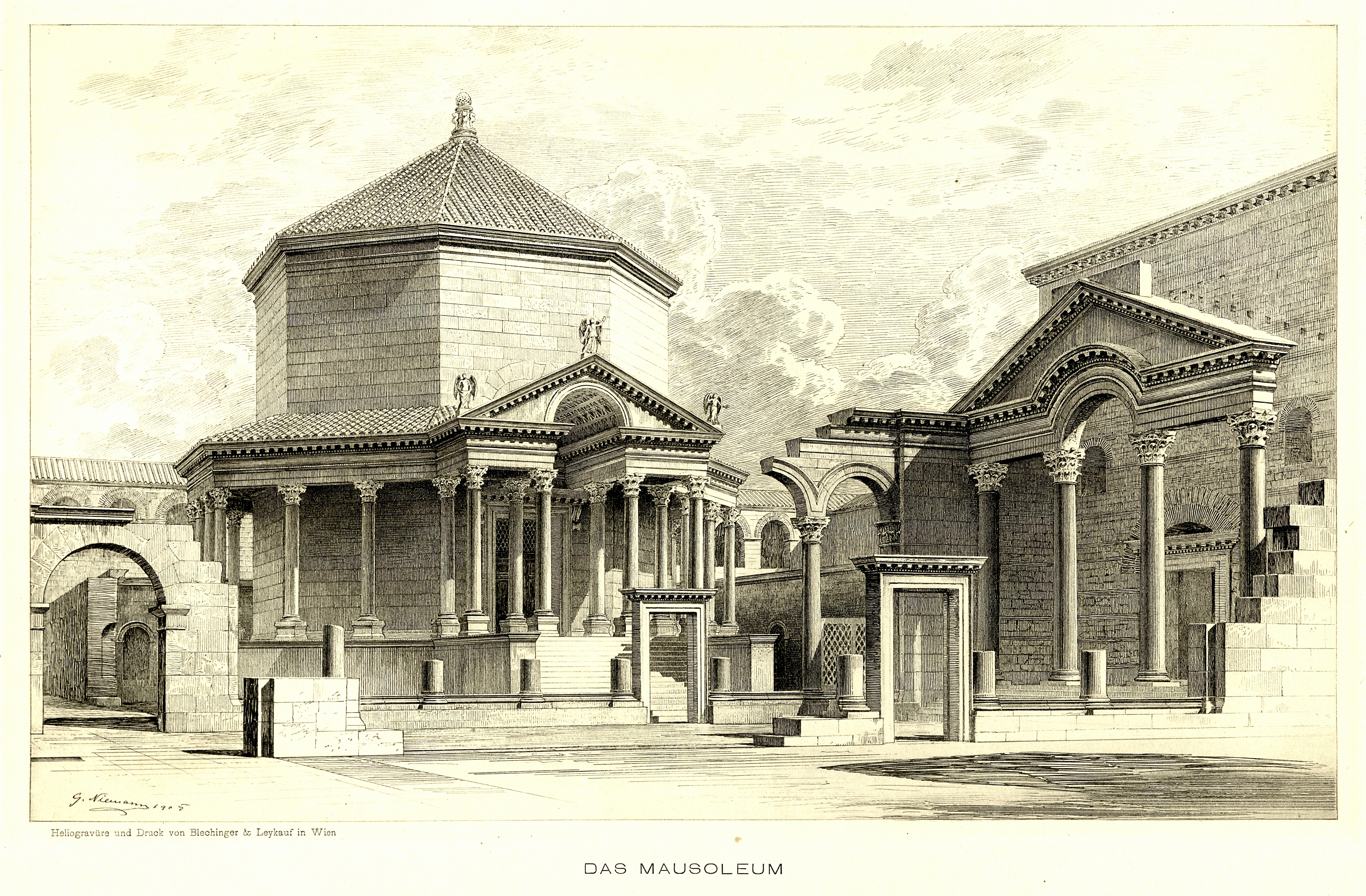
Peristyle inside Diocletian's Palace with Mausoleum before the tower bell (ca. 1904 - 1910)

The mausoleum’s exterior octagon was originally surrounded by a colonnaded porch (a peripteral ambulatory) supported by 24 columns. Inside, the space is circular, articulated by four semicircular and four rectangular niches. At its center once stood Diocletian’s sarcophagus, later destroyed. Above the niches rise eight Corinthian columns of red granite, topped by another ring of eight smaller columns. A continuous frieze runs around the interior, carved in relief with hunting Erotes, theatrical masks, and human heads. Particularly intriguing are two ribboned medallions, which archaeologists and local Split tradition identify as portraits of Emperor Diocletian and his wife Prisca. The dome is an architectural highlight: built with fan-shaped brickwork in its lower sections and circular brick courses in its upper third. Like the dome of the nearby Vestibule of Diocletian’s Palace, it once shimmered with brilliant mosaics.

Today, the cathedral functions as a liturgical space, with regular Sunday Mass and an annual procession on the feast day of Split's patron saint, Saint Domnius.

== Architecture ==
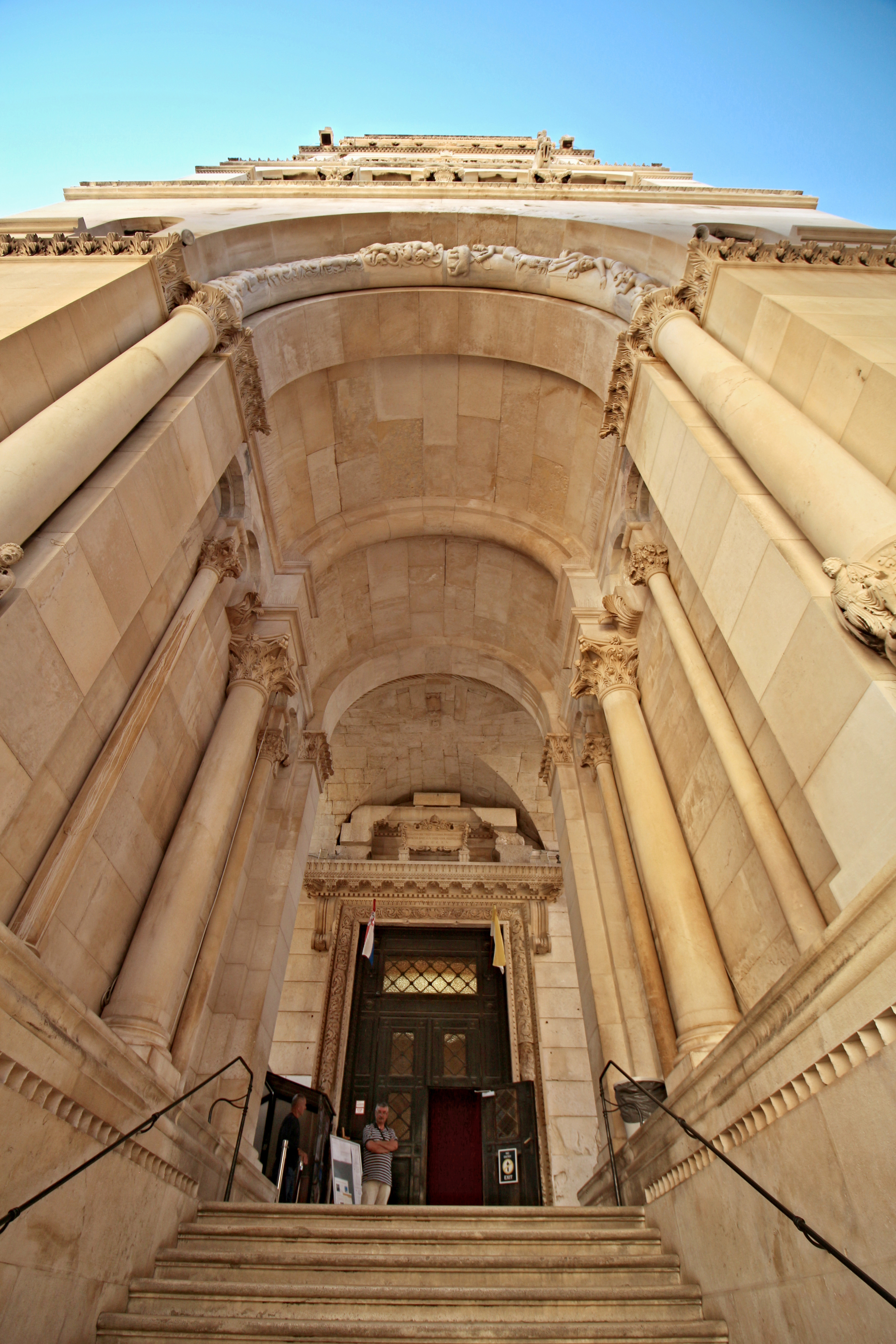
Portal of the cathedral

From the outside, the church has an octagonal layout and was once encircled by a roofed peripter supported by twenty-four marble columns with Corinthian capitals, incorporating a portal of ancient Roman origin. A Baroque stone plaque, crowned with a tiara, emphasizes the church’s former metropolitan and primatial status, which the archdiocese retained until it was formally abolished by the papal bull Locum Beati Petri in 1828. The interior of the church is circular in plan, covered by a dome and articulated by square and semicircular niches that once housed statues of gods and emperors. The inner space is encircled by eight Corinthian columns of red granite. Of particular interest are two ribbon-framed medallions, which archaeologists and local tradition in Split identify as portraits of Emperor Diocletian and his wife Prisca.

=== Portal ===
One of the cathedral’s most celebrated features is its wooden doors, carved in walnut in 1214 by the Split native Andrija Buvina. They are decorated with 28 carved scenes—fourteen on each wing—depicting episodes from the life of Christ, ranging from the Annunciation by Gabriel to the Resurrection. The doors have survived to the present day in remarkably fine condition. Buvina’s doors are a rarity in European artistic heritage, as very few medieval doors made of wood have been preserved to this day.

=== Interior ===
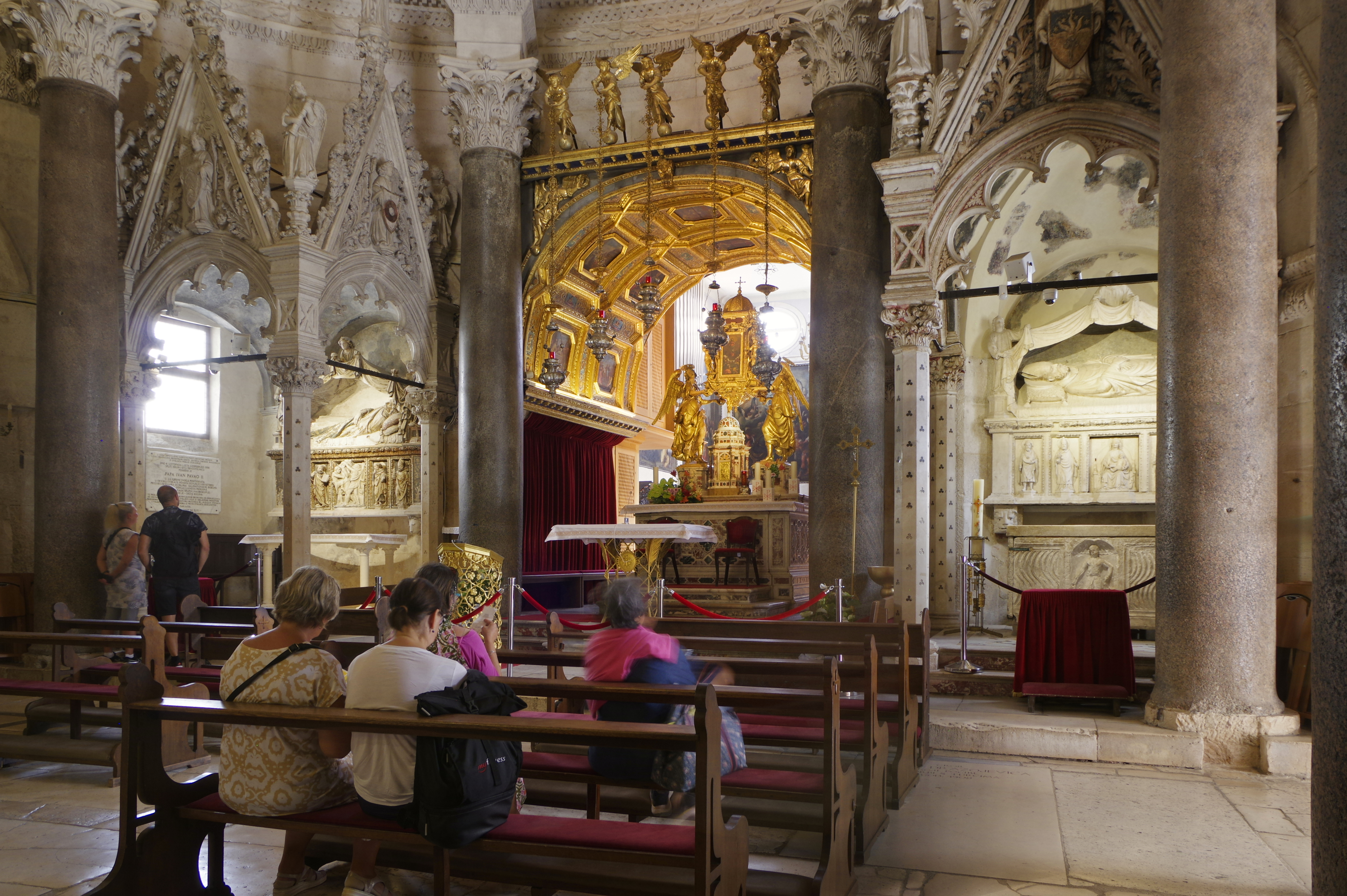
Main altar inside

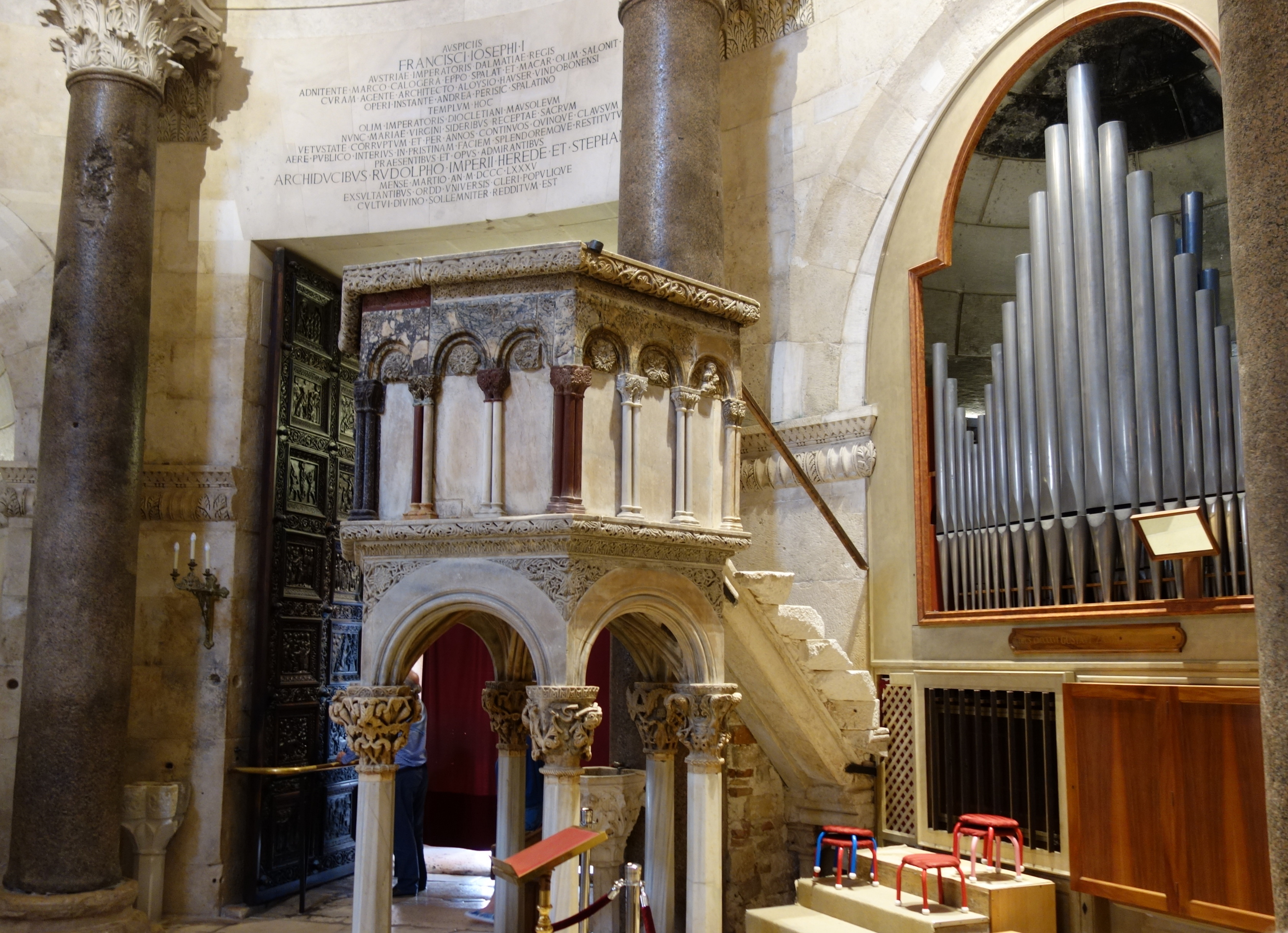
Baroque pulpit

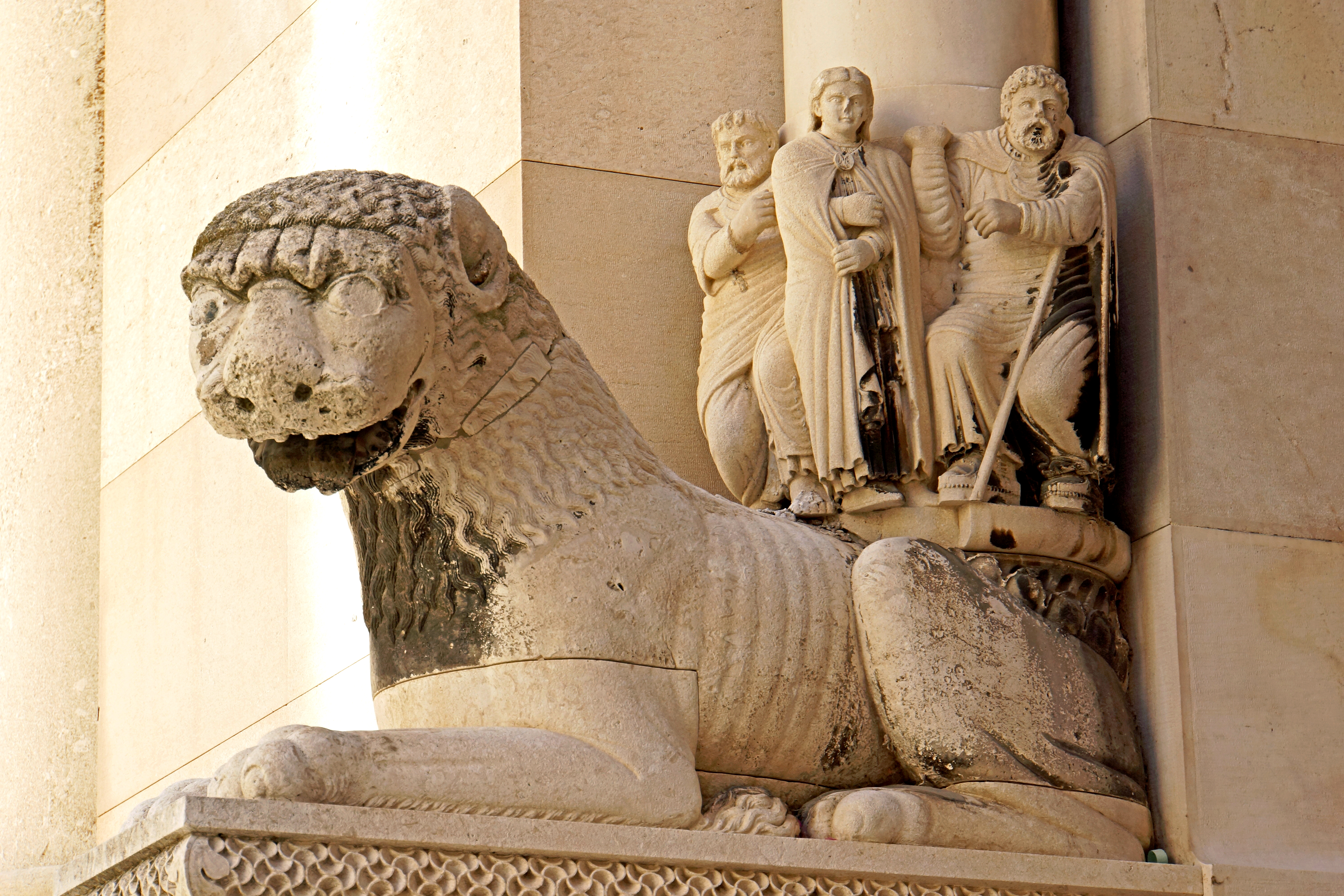
Lion statue in front

To the left of the entrance stands a hexagonal pulpit from the 13th century, made of costly green porphyry and once entirely gilded. The right side altar was dedicated to Saint Domnius, bishop of Salona and martyr. Its altar canopy (ciborium) was erected in 1427 by Bonino da Milano in the Late Gothic style, while frescoes of the four Evangelists were added in 1429 by the Split painter Dujam Vušković. The left side altar, dedicated to Split’s co-patron saint, the Solin martyr Anastasius of Aquileia, was created in 1448 by the greatest Croatian architect and sculptor of his age, Juraj Dalmatinac. Especially striking is the central relief on the sarcophagus depicting the Flagellation of Christ, where Dalmatinac portrays Christ as deeply moved by suffering and pain. The main altar was constructed between 1685 and 1689. In the northern niche stands an altar made in 1767 by the Venetian sculptor Giovanni Maria Morlaiter; since 1770, it has housed the relics of Saint Domnius, transferred from Bonino’s altar. The most important works in the cathedral’s Baroque choir are the wooden choir stalls, originally placed before the main altar and carved in the first half of the 13th century. The cathedral’s bell tower, rising to 57 meters, is the most authentic example of medieval architecture in Dalmatia and was begun in the 13th century. It underwent extensive restoration and partial alteration at the turn of the 19th to the 20th century. Today, visitors can climb the bell tower’s stairs to the top, from where a spectacular panoramic view of the entire city of Split unfolds.

The Cathedral of St. Domnius is composed of three different sections of different ages. The main part is Emperor Diocletian's mausoleum, which dates from the end of the 3rd century. The mausoleum was built like the rest of the palace with white local limestone and marble of high quality, most of which was from marble quarries on the island of Brač, with tuff taken from the nearby river Jadro beds, and with brick made in Salonitan and other factories.

=== Tower bell ===
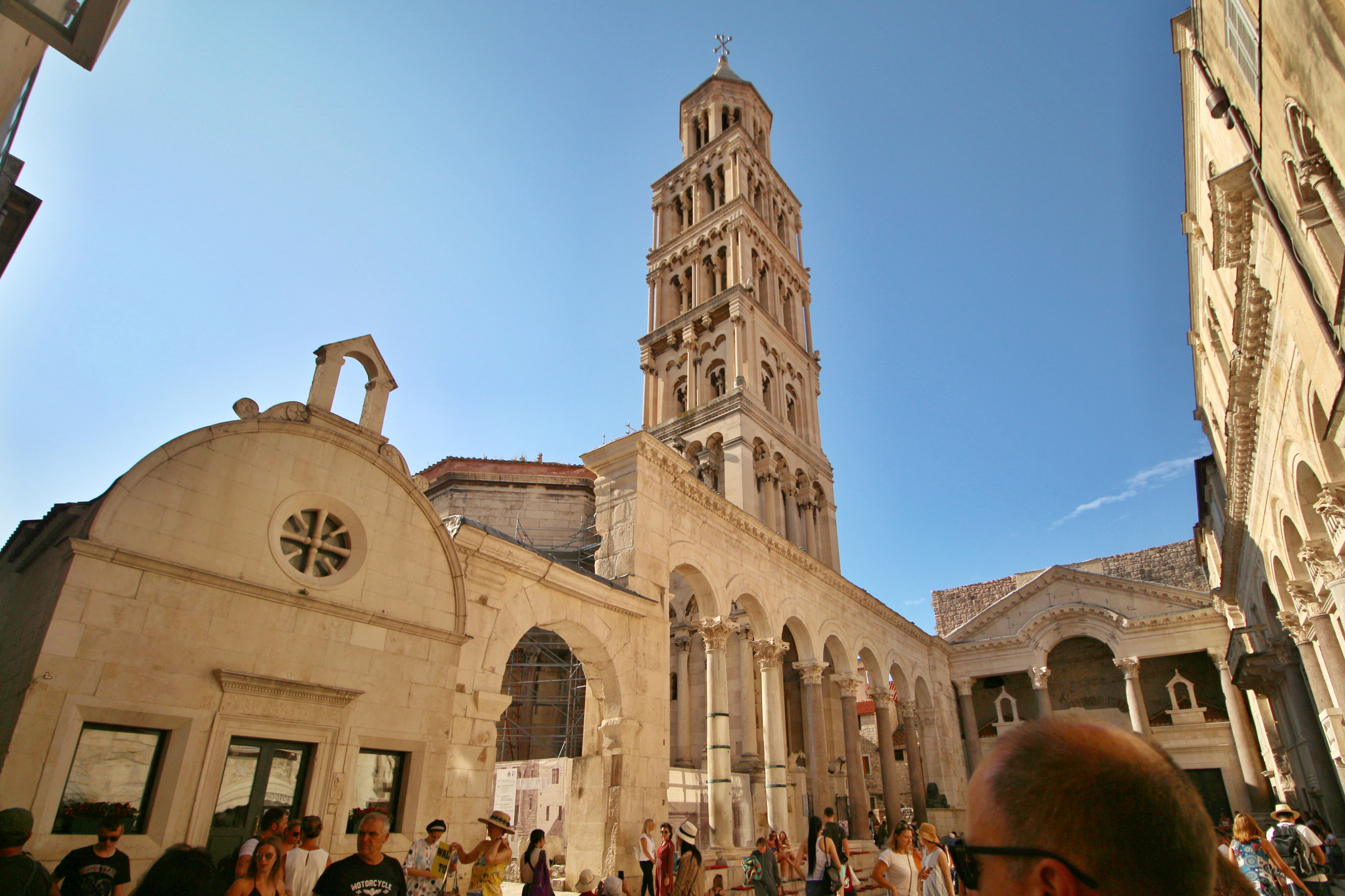
Tower bell and Diocletian's Palace

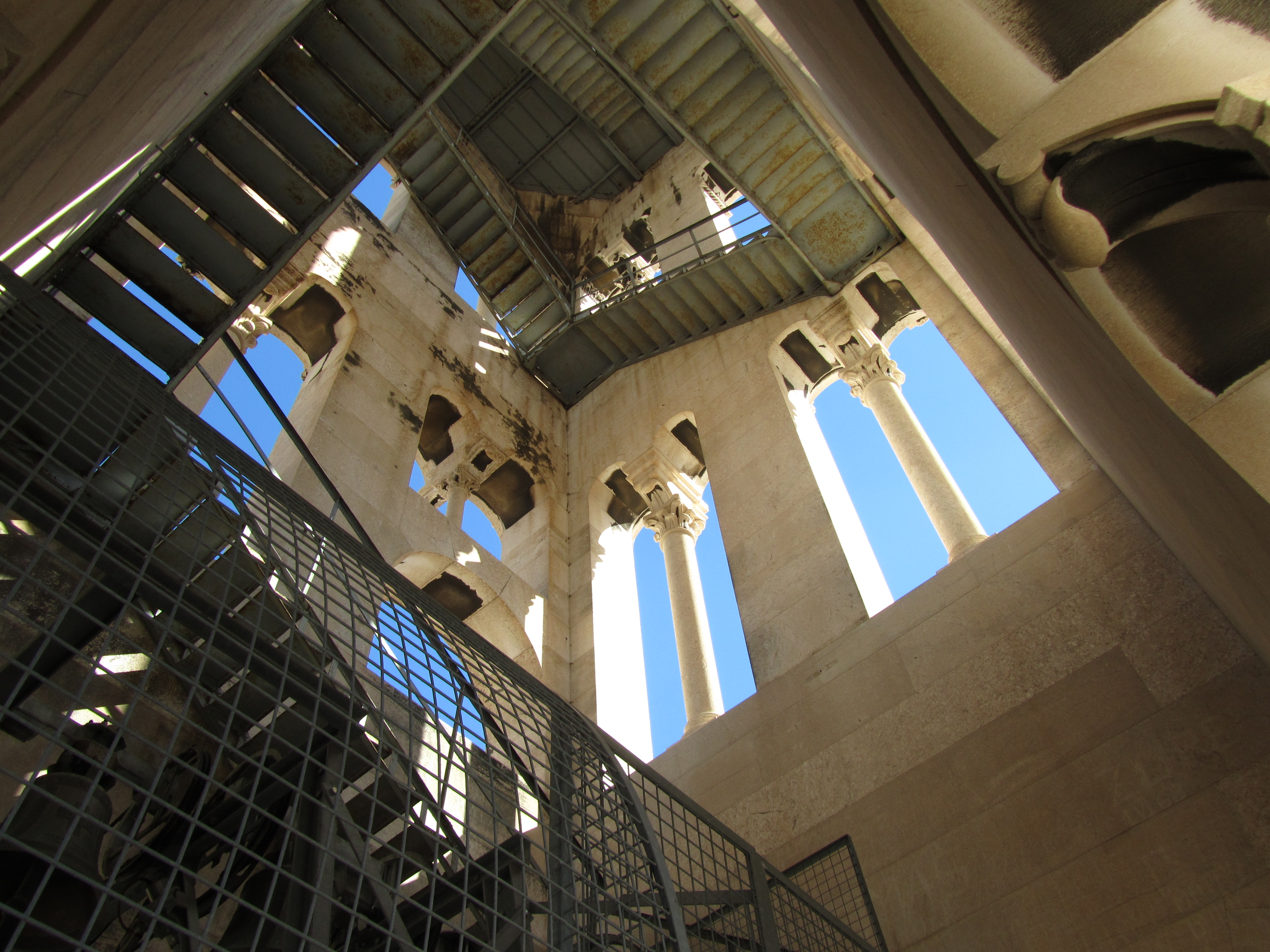
Stairs in tower bell leading to observation deck

The bell tower was constructed in the year 1100 AD, in the Romanesque style. Extensive rebuilding in 1908 radically changed the Bell Tower, and many of the original Romanesque sculptures were removed. The bell tower of the Cathedral of St. Domnius is 57 meters high and one of the most original church bell towers on the Adriatic coast. Construction began in the mid-13th century and lasted until the mid-16th. Due to the extremely long construction period, it is a combination of Romanesque Architecture and Gothic architecture, but the styles are in excellent harmony. The Romanesque style prevails in the decorative elements, and the execution of architectural transparency belongs to the Gothic style of construction.

The bell tower is a distinctive architectural work, specific for its slenderness and transparency, for its gradual narrowing towards the top and its integration into the ancient architectural environment, because the use of cornices and capitals, in the format of openings and arches, corresponds to the arcades of the Peristyle and the trabeation of the peripter of the mausoleum.

The bell tower was thoroughly restored between 1890 and 1908. The top floor with hints of Renaissance style was completely changed to be in stylistic harmony with the other floors. Numerous ancient spolia and sculptures depicting griffins, lions, sphinxes and people were removed. Some fragments of the old bell tower are kept in the Split City Museum or have been incorporated into the Tusculum building in Salona.

Later, in the 17th century a choir was added to the eastern side of the mausoleum. For that purpose the eastern wall of the mausoleum was torn down in order to unify the two chambers.

== Treasury ==
On the first floor of the sacristy is the cathedral treasury, which contains relics of Saint Domnius, which were brought to the cathedral after his death.

Other treasures include sacral art works, like the Romanesque The Madonna and Child panel painting from the 13th century, objects like chalices and reliquaries by goldsmiths from the 13th to the 19th century, and mass vestments from the 14th until 19th century. It also contains famous books like the Book of gospels (Splitski Evandelistar) from the 6th century, the Supetar cartulary (Kartularium from Sumpetar) from the 11th century, and the Historia Salonitana (The History of the people of Salona) by Thomas the Archdeacon from Split in the 13th century.

== Gallery ==
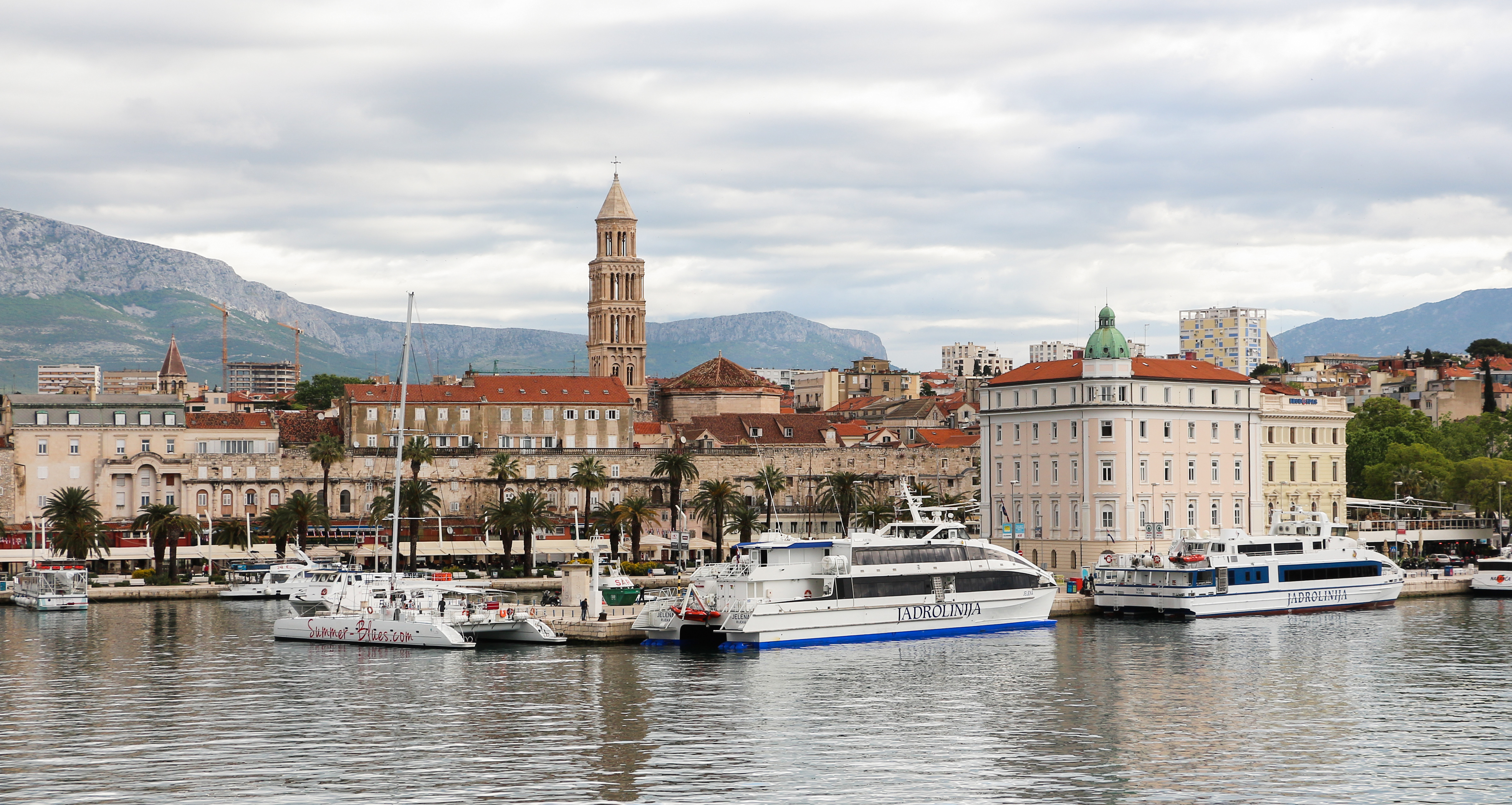
Tower bell seen from Port of Split

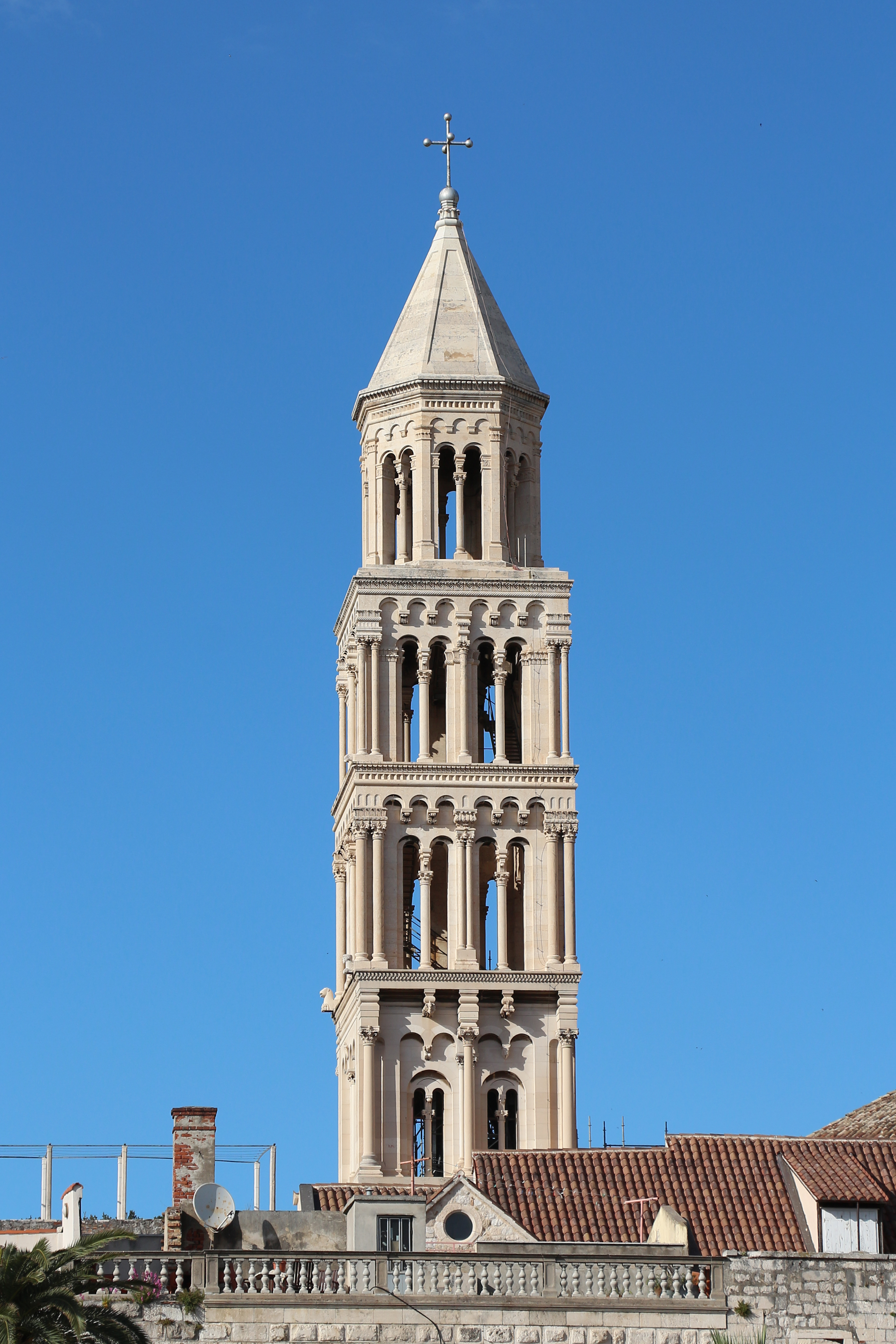
Bell tower

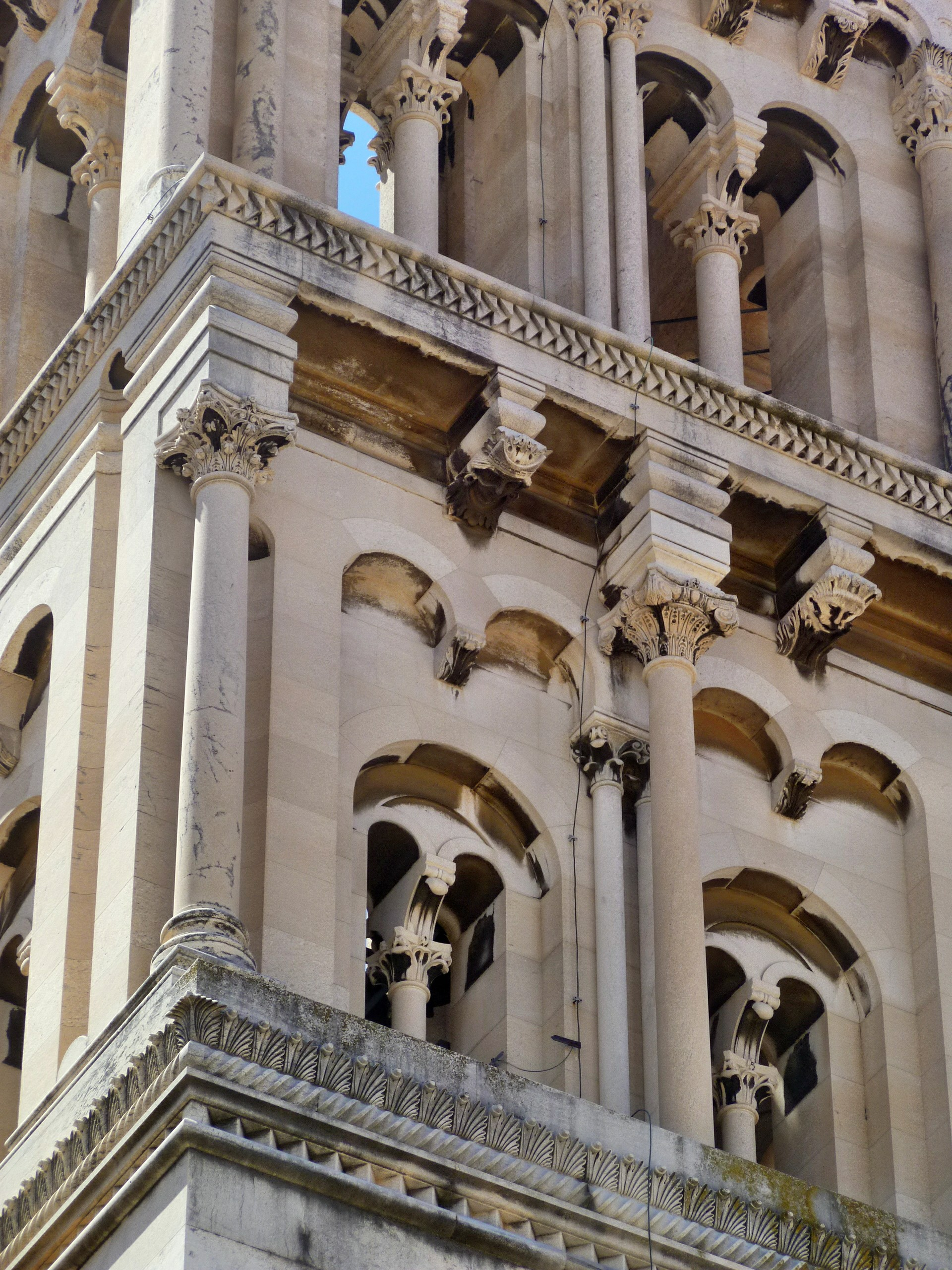
Bell tower upclose

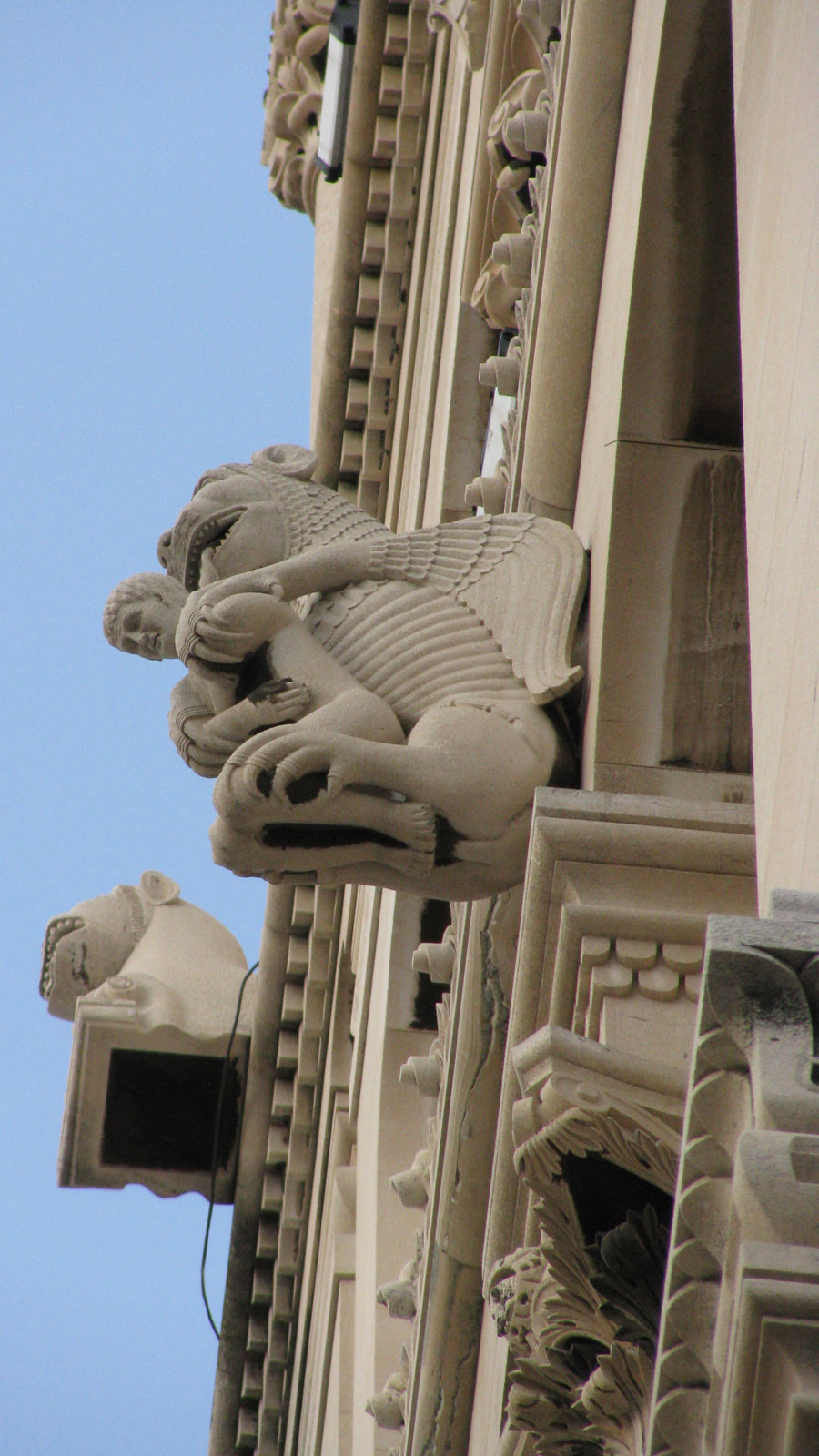
Gargoyles

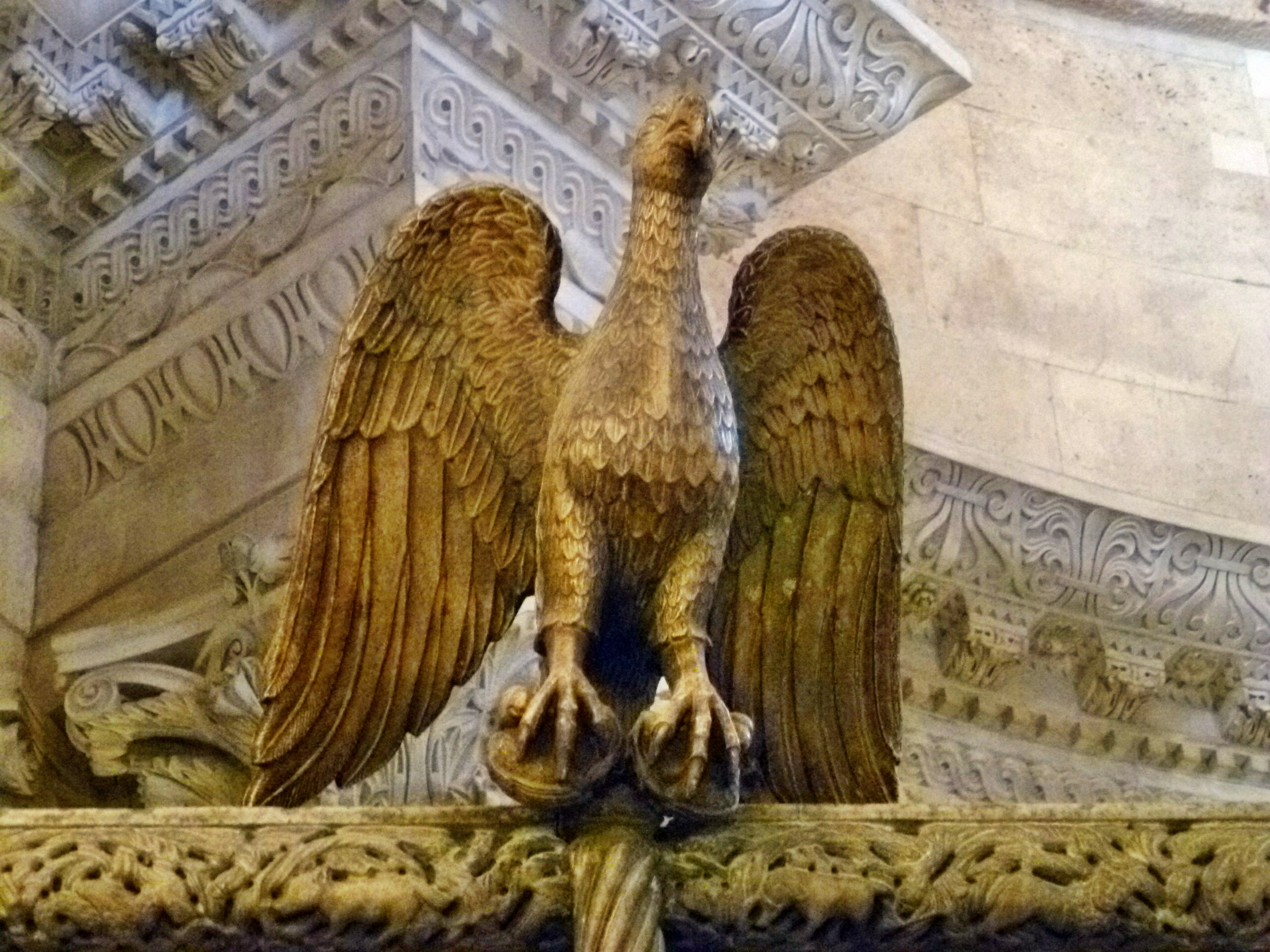
Interior of the cathedral

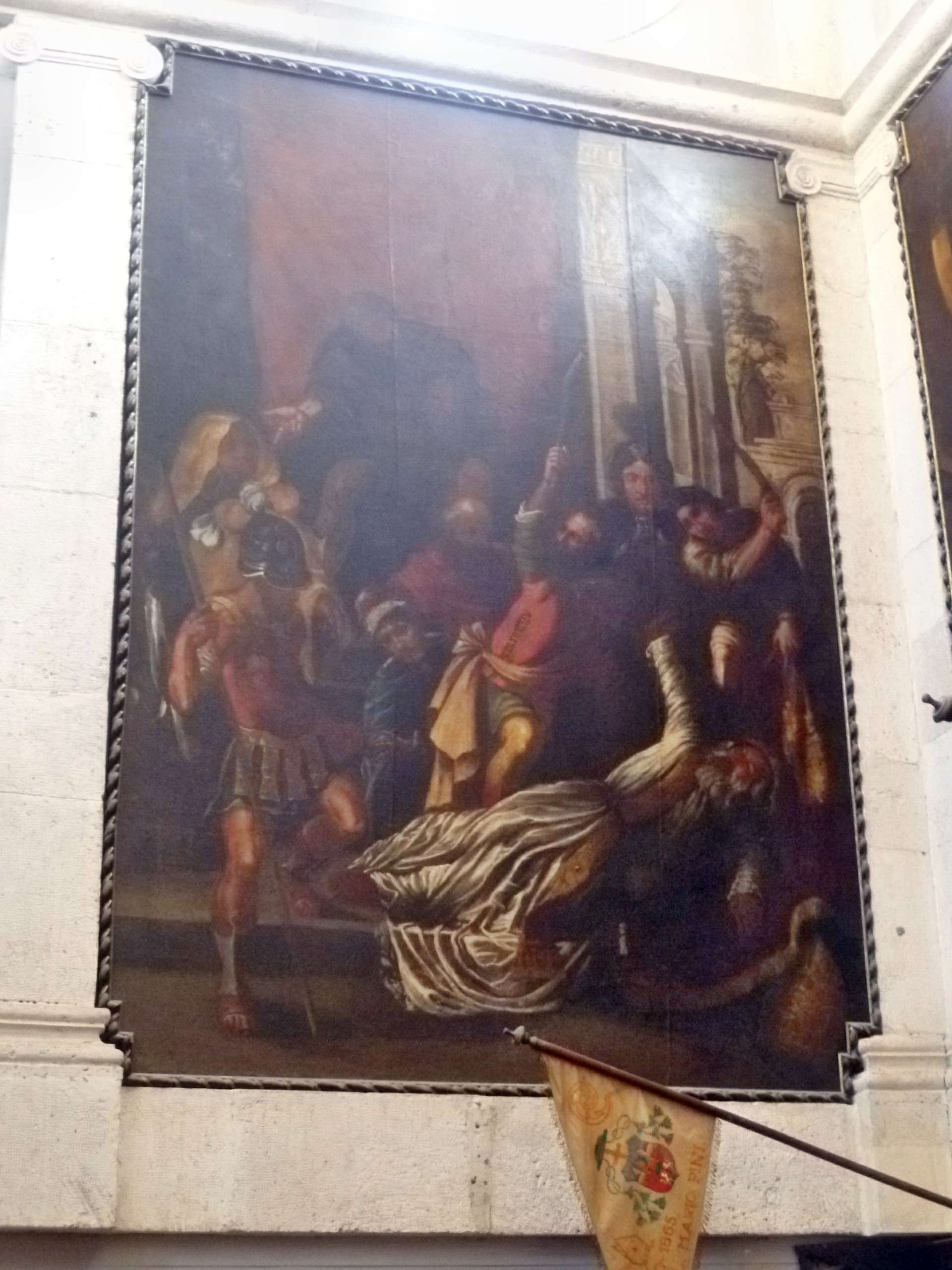
Canvas depicting the life of St. Domnius by the Baroque painter Pietro Ferrari (1685)

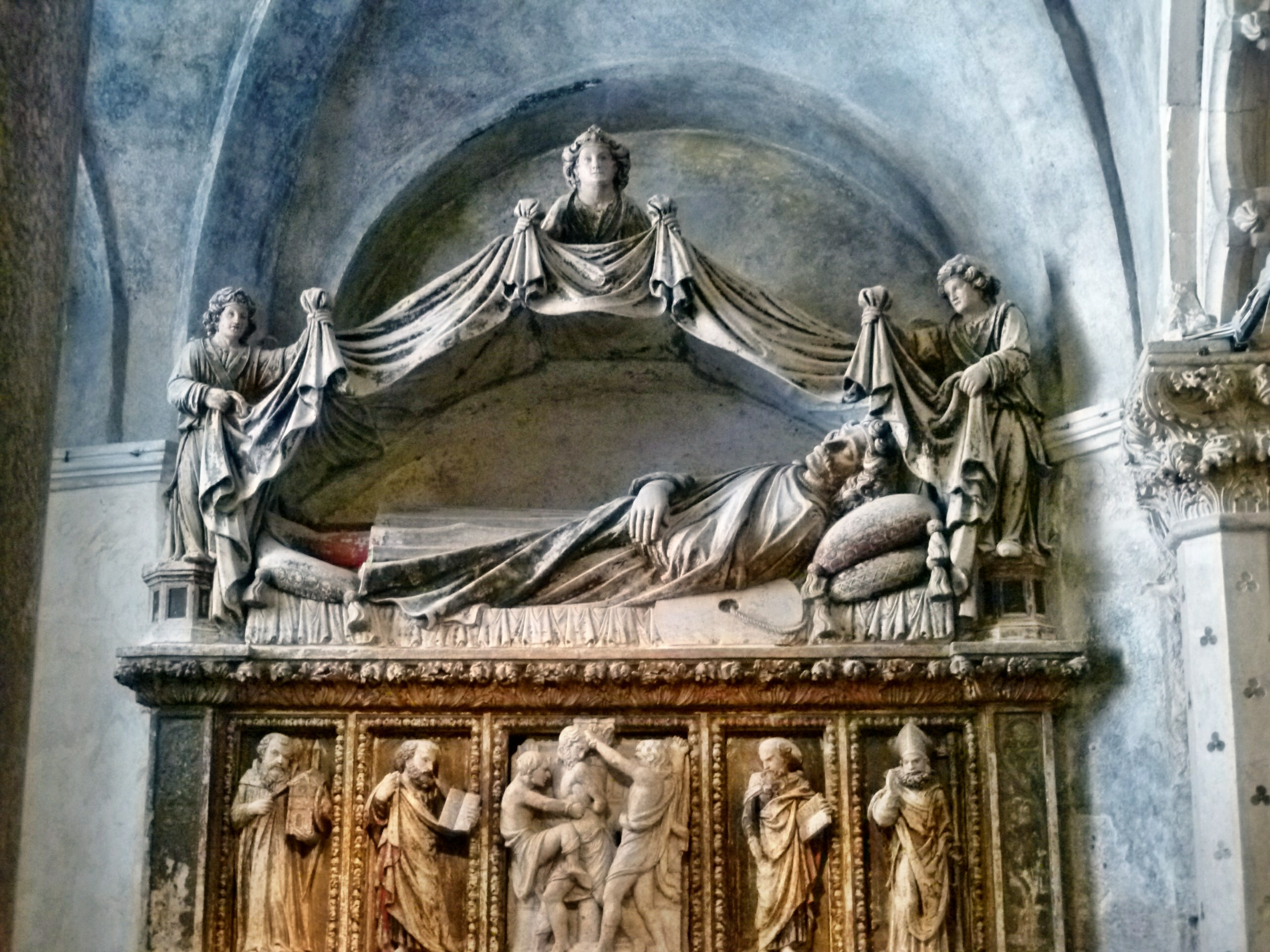
Statue inside

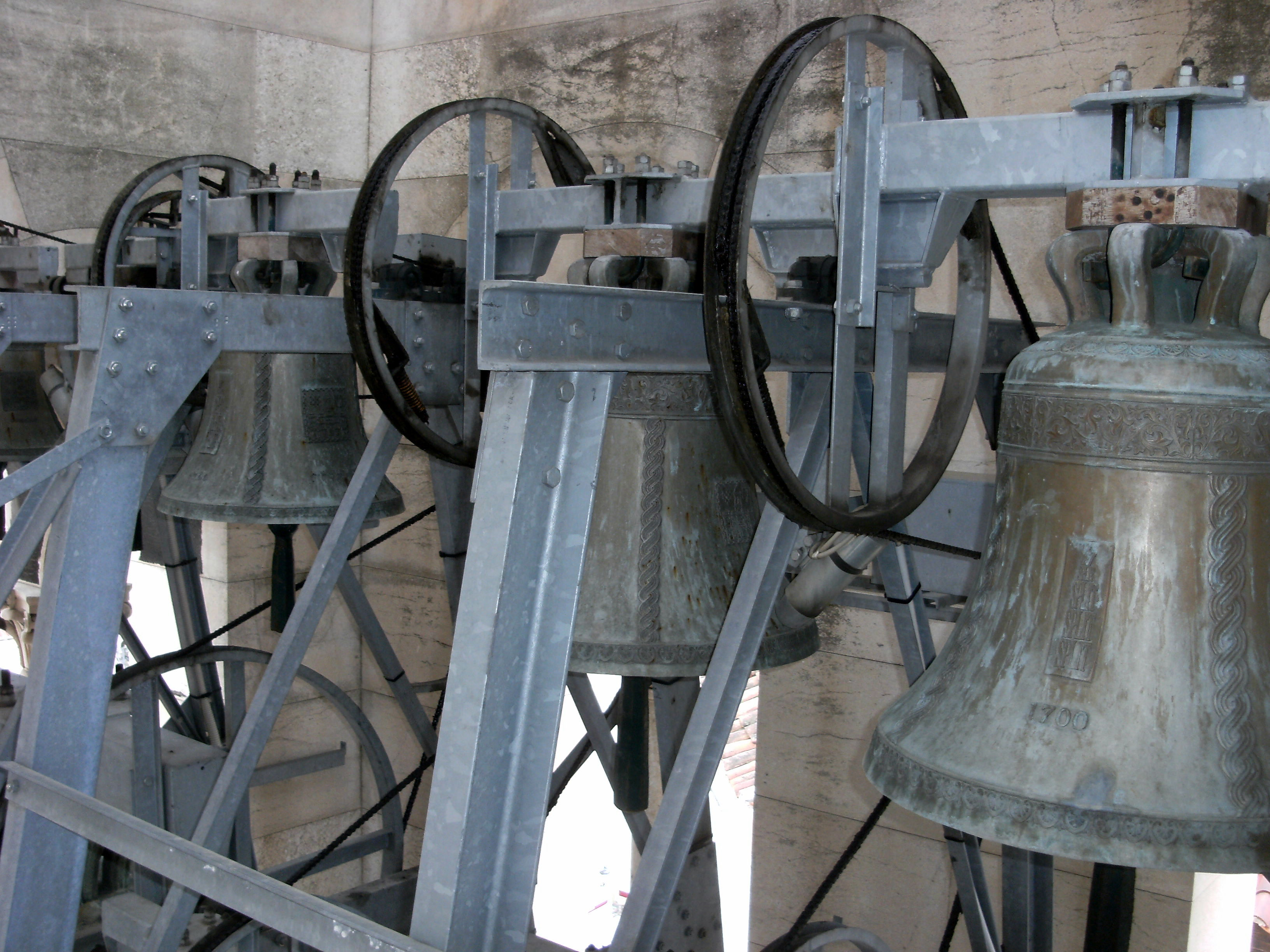
Bells inside the tower

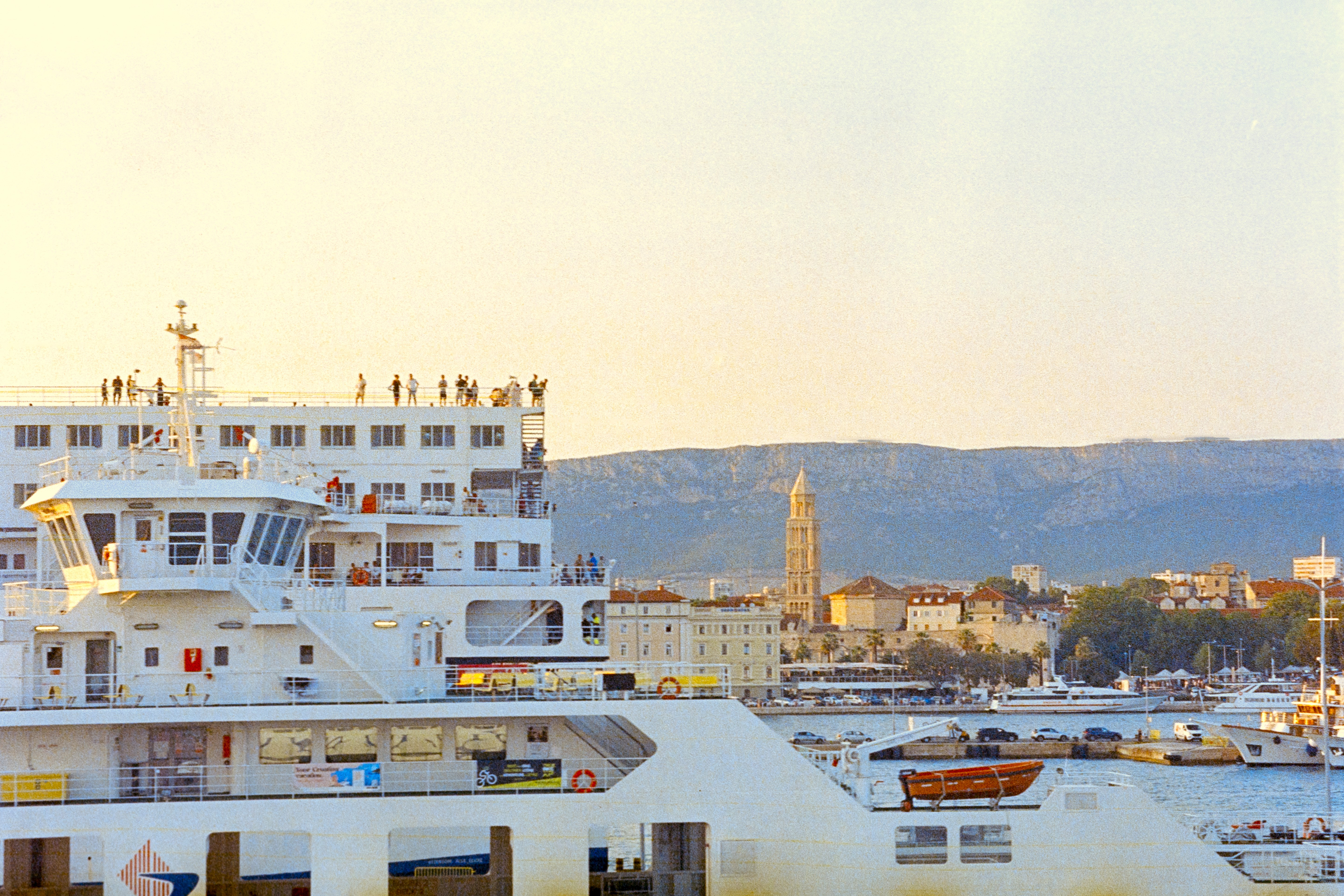
The tower from the Port of Split

== See also ==
- Ancient Roman and Byzantine domes
- List of tallest structures built before the 20th century
- List of tallest buildings in Croatia
