= Nicolaus Dinaricio =

Croatian clergyman and bishop

- Archbishop of Split
- Native name: Nikola Dinarić
- Church: Catholic Church
- Archdiocese: Archdiocese of Split
- In office: 3 January 1757 – 1764
- Predecessor: Pacifico Bizza
- Successor: Ivan Luka Garanjin
- Previous post: Bishop of Ossero (1745-1757)

Orders
- Ordination: 23 September 1724
- Consecration: 28 November 1745 by Ferdinando Maria de' Rossi

Personal details
- Born: 1700 Łezina, Stato da Màr, Most Serene Republic of Venice
- Died: 1764 (aged 63–64)

Nicolaus Dinaricio (born in 1700 in Hvar) was a Croatian clergyman and bishop for the Roman Catholic Archdiocese of Split-Makarska. He was appointed bishop in 1757. He died in 1764.
