= Pacifico Bizza =

Croatian clergyman and bishop

- Archbishop of Split
- Native name: Pacifik Bizza
- Church: Catholic Church
- Archdiocese: Archdiocese of Split
- In office: 17 January 1746 – 13 May 1756
- Predecessor: Antun Kadčić
- Successor: Nicolaus Dinaricio
- Previous post: Bishop of Arbe (1738-1746)

Orders
- Ordination: 16 April 1718
- Consecration: 30 November 1738 by Giuseppe Spinelli

Personal details
- Born: 3 May 1695 Arbe, Stato da Màr, Most Serene Republic of Venice
- Died: 13 May 1756 (aged 61)

Pacifico Bizza (born in 1695 in Arbe) was a Croatian clergyman and bishop for the Roman Catholic Archdiocese of Split-Makarska. He was appointed bishop in 1738. He died in 1756.
