= Giovanni Battista Laghi =

Italian clergyman and bishop

Giovanni Battista Laghi (born in 1665 in Venice) was an Italian clergyman and bishop for the Roman Catholic Archdiocese of Split-Makarska. He was appointed bishop in 1720. He died in 1730.
