= Saint Domnius =

Bishop of Salona

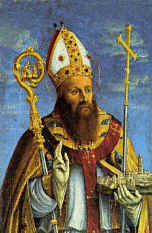
- Saint Domnius holding the city of Split

Bishop and Martyr
- Born: 3rd century Antioch, Syria, Roman Empire (modern-day Antakya, Hatay, Turkey)
- Died: 304; Salona, Dalmatia, Roman Empire
- Venerated in: Eastern Orthodox Church; Roman Catholic Church
- Feast: 7 May
- Attributes: bishop holding the city of Split or the Cathedral of Saint Domnius
- Patronage: Split, Croatia

Saint Domnius (also known as Saint Dujam or Saint Duje, Saint Domnio, Saint Doimus, or Saint Domninus) was a Bishop of Salona (today's Solin) around the year 300, and is venerated as the patron of the nearby city of Split in modern Croatia.

== Traditional narrative ==
Christian tradition states that he was one of the Seventy Disciples of the 1st century. This tradition holds that Domnio came to Rome with Saint Peter and was then sent by Peter to evangelize Dalmatia, where he was martyred along with eight soldiers he had converted.

He was more likely a martyr of the 4th century. He was born in Antioch, (in modern-day Turkey but historically in Syria), to a prominent and wealthy family. He was educated at the university there. Domnius became bishop of Salona around 284, and was later beheaded 10 April 304 at the amphitheatre in Salona, a large Roman city serving as capital of the Province of Dalmatia. Saint Domnius was martyred with seven other Christians in the persecutions of the Emperor Diocletian, and was buried in the Manastirine cemetery, outside the walls of Salona.

== Veneration ==
When Salona was sacked by the Avars and Slavs in the 6th century, the population eventually moved to the nearby Palace of Diocletian, enlarging the nearby city of Split (Spalatum), and establishing it as the successor to Salona. Saint Domnius became the city's patron saint, and the city's Cathedral of Saint Domnius was built in the mausoleum of Diocletian itself, the emperor who martyred him. His relics were later moved to the Cathedral of Saint Domnius in Split.

Saint Domnius' Day, locally known as Sudamja (pron. Soodamyah) is celebrated in Split on May 7. Part of the celebration includes a procession led with a silver reliquary of the saint's relics.

The Basilica of St. John Lateran in Rome claims to own some of Domnio's relics, since Pope John IV, in the 7th century, had requested that relics of a martyr named Domnio be brought to Rome.

== See also ==
- Diocletian's Palace
- Cathedral of St. Duje in Split
