= Sfortia Ponzoni =

Italian bishop

Sfortia Ponzoni (born in 1582 in Venice) was an Italian clergyman and bishop for the Roman Catholic Archdiocese of Split-Makarska. He was appointed bishop in 1616. He died in 1640.
