= Archdiocese of Split-Makarska =

Catholic archdiocese in Croatia and Montenegro

Coordinates: 43.5081°N 16.4405°E

Metropolitan Archdiocese of Split-Makarska Archidioecesis Spalatensis-Macarscensis Splitsko-makarska nadbiskupija

Catholic
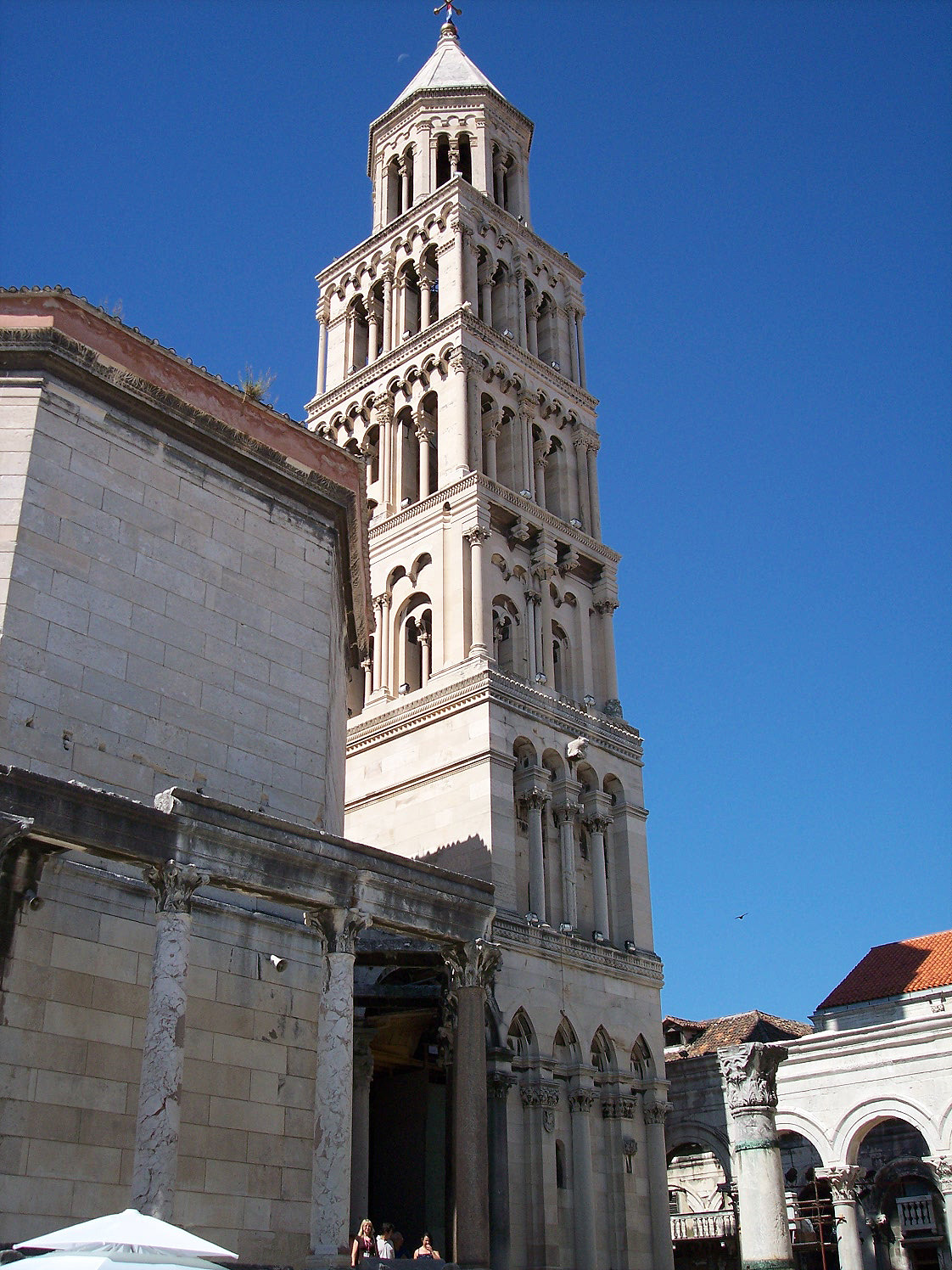
- Cathedral of Saint Domnius

Location
- Country: Croatia; Montenegro
- Ecclesiastical province: Split

Statistics
- Area: 4,088 km^{2} (1,578 sq mi)
- Population: Total; Catholics: (as of 2014); 456,029; 441,036 (96.7%)

Information
- Denomination: Catholic Church
- Sui iuris church: Latin Church
- Rite: Roman Rite
- Established: 3rd century
- Cathedral: Cathedral of Saint Domnius, Split
- Co-cathedral: Co-cathedral of Saint Mark, Makarska Saint Peter, Split

Current leadership
- Pope: Leo XIV
- Metropolitan Archbishop: Zdenko Križić
- Bishops emeritus: Marin Barišić

Map

Website
- nadbiskupija-split.com

The Archdiocese of Split-Makarska (Latin: Archidioecesis Spalatensis-Macarscensis; Croatian: Splitsko-makarska nadbiskupija) is a Latin Metropolitan archdiocese of the Catholic Church in Croatia and Montenegro. The diocese was established in the 3rd century AD and was made an archdiocese and metropolitan see in the 10th century. The modern diocese was erected in 1828, when the historical archdiocese of Salona was combined with the Diocese of Makarska. It was elevated as an archdiocese and metropolitan see in 1969, restoring the earlier status of the archdiocese of Split, as it is also known. The diocese was also known as Spalato-Macarsca.

== History ==
The see was founded in or before 300 AD as Diocese of Salona. Eastern Roman Emperor Leo I (r. 457–474) appointed Glycerius as Bishop of Salona in 474, Glycerius had earlier served as Western Roman Emperor but was deposed by Julius Nepos. Around 500 AD it was promoted to a Metropolitan archdiocese.

The Archbishopric of Spalathon or Spalatum (also Salona, Latin: Spalatum) was a Christian archbishopric with seat in Salona, Dalmatia (modern Split, Croatia) in the early Middle Ages. Salona was ravaged by the South Slavs (Sclaveni) in 614, but in its place, Spalatum subsequently emerged.

It lost territory in 1144 to establish the Diocese of Hvar. It lost territory again in 1344 to re-establish the Roman Catholic Diocese of Makarska, in 1400 it regained that territory from the re-suppressed the Diocese of Makarska, but again lost territory in 1615 to re-re-establish the Diocese of Makarska.

With the death of Archbishop Laelius Cippico (1807) began another interregnum which lasted twenty-three years. By papal bull Locum Beati Petri the Church in Dalmatia was reorganized in 1828, Makarska united with Split, and the latter demoted as a simple bishopric of Split-Makarska, made subject to the Archdiocese of Zadar. Paul Miossich was appointed first bishop of the new diocese in 1830. It also absorbed the suppressed Tragurium (or Traù, now Trogir).

It was elevated to the status of a metropolitan archdiocese on 27 July 1969. Pope John Paul II visited the archdiocese in October 1998.

== Special churches ==
Its cathedral episcopal see is the Cathedral of Saint Domnius (Katedrala sv. Dujma), in Split (Dalmatia). The city also has the co-cathedral of Saint Peter Apostle (Konkatedrala sv. Petar Apostola).

There are former cathedrals in three former sees absorbed in the archdiocese:

- World Heritage Site: Katedrala sv. Lovre, in Trogir, formerly Trau or Tragurium
- World Heritage Site: Crkva sv. Ivan Krstitelj, also in Trogir
- Katedrala sv. Marka, in Makarska

== Ecclesiastical province ==
Its suffragans are

- in Croatia:
  - Diocese of Dubrovnik (Ragusa)
  - Diocese of Hvar
  - Diocese of Šibenik (Knin)
- in Montenegro:
  - Diocese of Kotor (Cattaro)

== Episcopal ordinaries ==
Bishops of Salona

Known bishops of Salona include :

- Saint Domnius is patron saint of both the Archdiocese and the city of Split.
- Hesychius III is mentioned in the twentieth book of St.Augustine of Hippo's De Civitate Dei
- Glycerius, 474
- an epistle from Pope Gelasius I (492–496) is addressed to bishop Honorius.

Metropolitan Archbishops of Salona

Archbishop Honorius III conducted a synod in 530; Natalis at a Council in 590, unjustly deposed his archdeacon Honoratus, but pope Gregory the Great took the latter's part.

- Natalis, 582 (20th)
- Maximus the Schismatic
- John of Ravenna † (650 – circa 680)
- Petar II † (?)
- Martin I † (?)
- Leone † (?)
- Petar III † (840–860 Died)
- Justin † (860–876 Died)
- Marino † (881–886 Died)
- Teodozije † (887–893)
- Petar IV † (893–912)
- Ivan II † (914–928)
- Januarije II † (?–circa 940)
- Frontinijan III † (circa 940 – circa 970)
- Martin II † (970–1000)
- Pavao † (1015–1030)
- Martin III † (1030)
- Dobralj † (1030–1050 Deposed)
- Ivan III † (1050–1059 Resigned)
- Lawrence † (1059–1099 Died)
- Crescenzio † (1110–1112 Died)
- Manasse † (1112 – 1114 o 1115 Deposed)
- Sede vacante (1115–1135)
- Grgur † (1135)
- Gaudio † (1136–1158 Deposed)
- Absalom † (1159–1161 Died)
- Petar V † (2 July 1161 Appointed – 1166 Died)
- Albert de Morra † (1166)
- Gerardo † (1167–1175 nominated archbishop of Siponto)

Out of the long series of its seventy-nine archbishops may be mentioned St. Rayner (d. 1180), and the unfortunate Marcus Antonius de Dominis, who was deprived of his office after having filled it for fourteen years and died an apostate at Rome in 1624; Thomas, who resigned his office voluntarily (thirteenth century), is the author of a history of the bishops of Salona and Spalato.

- Raynerius of Split † (1175 – 4 August 1180 Died)
- Sede vacante (1180–1185)
- Petar VI † (1185–1187 nominated archbishop of Kalocsa)
- Petar VII † (1188–1196)
- Bernard of Perugia † (1198–1217 Died)
- Slavič † (1217–1219)
- Göncöl † (29 Jul 1220 Appointed – 31 May 1242 Died)
- Stephen (July 1242 – November 1243 Resigned) (elected archbishop)
- Thomas the Archdeacon (1243 – 1244) (elected archbishop)
- Ugrin † (April 1245 – 27 Nov 1248 Died)
- Ivan de Buzad (1248 – 1249) (elected archbishop)
- Roger of Torre Maggiore † (30 April 1249 Appointed – 14 April 1266 Died)
- Ivan de Buzad † (1266 Appointed – 1294 Died)
- Jakob † (1294–1297 Resigned) (elected archbishop)
- Petar VIII † (10 May 1297 Appointed – 1324)
- Belian † (26 Sep 1324 Appointed – 28 Jan 1328 Died)
- Domenico Luccari † (17 Oct 1328 Appointed – April 1348 Died)
- Ivan † (30 May 1348 Appointed – ?)
- Hugolin Branca † (25 June 1349 Appointed – 1388 Resigned)
- Andrea Gualdo † (29 May 1389 Appointed – 1402 Resigned)
- Pellegrino d'Aragona † (18 April 1403 Appointed – 7 Mau 1409 Died)
- Doimo Giudici † (11 August 1410 Appointed – 1411 Resigned), also Dujam de Judicibus
- Peter of Pag † (19 Oct. 1411 Appointed – 30 dicembre 1426 Died)
- Francesco Malipiero † (27 Jan. 1427 Appointed – 16 June 1428 nominated archbishop of Castello)
- Bartolomeo Zabarella † (16 June 1428 Appointed – 18 Dec 1439 nominated archbishop of Firenze)
- Jacopino Badoer (18 Dec 1439 – 1451 Died)
- Lorenzo Zanni (Zane) (5 June 1452 – 28 April 1473 Appointed, Bishop of Treviso)
- Pietro Riario † (28 April 1473 Appointed as Apostolic administrator – 3 Jan 1474 Died)
- Giovanni Dacri, OFM, 1474 – 15 Feb 1485 Died)
- Pietro Foscari † (1 April 1478 Appointed as Apostolic administrator – 17 Sep 1479 Resigned)
- Bartolomeo Averoldi (1479–1503)
- Bernardo Zanne † (15 Feb 1503 Appointed – 5 Jan 1524 Died)
- Andrea Cornaro † (1527 Appointed – 1537 Resigned)
- Marco Cornaro (Corner) † (11 Aug 1537 Appointed – 1566 Resigned)
- Alvise Michiel † (19 July 1566 Appointed – 1582 Died)
- Giovanni Domenico Marcot (Malcoto detto Foconio), OP † (1582 Succeeded – 2 Aug 1602 Died)
- Marc'Antonio de Dominis † (15 Nov 1602 Appointed – 1616 Resigned))
- Sfortia Ponzoni † (22 Aug 1616 Appointed – 1641 Died)
- Leonard Bondumier † (15 April 1641 Appointed – 1668 Resigned
- Bonifazio Albani, CRS † (30 Jan 1668 Appointed – 18 Feb 1678 Died)
- Stephanus Cosimi, CRS † (5 Sep 1678 Appointed – 10 May 1707 Died)
- Stefano Cupilli, CRS † (12 March 1708 Appointed – 11 Dec 1719 Died)
- Giovanni Battista Laghi, CRS † (15 Apr 1720 Appointed – 11 Feb 1730 Died)
- Antoine Kacich † (18 Dec 1730 Appointed – 7 Oct 1745 Died)
- Pacifico Bizza † (17 Jan 1746 Appointed – 13 May 1756 Died)
- Nicolaus Dinaricio † (3 Jan 1757 Appointed – Jun 1764 Died)
- Giovanni Luca Garagnin † (5 Jun 1765 Appointed – 20 Oct 1780 Died)
- Lelio de Cippico † (20 Sep 1784 Appointed – 24 Mar 1807 Died)

Suffragan Bishops of Split-Makarska

- Paolo Miossich † (15 March 1830 Confirmed – 10 Oct 1837 Died)
- Giuseppe Godeassi † (27 April 1840 Confirmed – 22 June 1843 Confirmed, Archbishop of Zadar)
- Luigi Pini † (17 June 1844 Confirmed – 11 Jan 1865 Died)
- Marko Kalogjera (Marco Calogerà, Calogjera) † (29 Oct 1866 Appointed – 1888 Died)
- Filip Frane Nakić † (30 Dec 1889 Appointed – 1910 Died)
- Antun Gjivoje † (11 July 1911 Appointed – 27 Feb 1917 Died)
- Georg Carić † (8 June 1918 Appointed – 17 May 1921 Died)
- Quirinus Clement Bonefacic † (6 June 1923 Appointed – 9 May 1954 Retired)
- Frane Franić † (24 Dec 1960 Appointed – see below)

Metropolitan Archbishops of Split-Makarska

- Frane Franić † (see above 24 Dec 1960 Appointed – 10 Sep 1988 Retired)
- Ante Jurić † (10 Sep 1988 Appointed – 21 June 2000 Retired)
- Marin Barišić (21 June 2000 Appointed – 13 May 2022 Retired)
- Dražen Kutleša (13 May 2022 Appointed – 14 February 2023 Appointed Coadjutor Archbishop of Zagreb)
- Zdenko Križić, OCD (8 September 2023 – present)

== Sources ==
- GigaCatholic with incumbent biography links
- Luttwak, Edward. The grand strategy of the Byzantine Empirep. 164
- History of the bishops of Salona and Split
