= Bernardo Zanne =

Italian clergyman and bishop

Bernardo Zanne or Bernardo Zanni (1450 – August 3, 1524) was an Italian clergyman and bishop for the Roman Catholic Archdiocese of Split-Makarska, ordained on August 31, 1498, and made bishop on February 15, 1503.
