= Čelebić =

- Village
- Location within Bosnia and Herzegovina
- Coordinates: 43°57′00″N 16°45′06″E
- Country: Bosnia and Herzegovina
- Entity: Federation of Bosnia and Herzegovina
- Canton: Canton 10
- Township: Livno

Area
  - Total: 39.25 km^{2} (15.15 sq mi)

Population (2013)
  - Total: 133
  - Density: 3.39/km^{2} (8.78/sq mi)
- Time zone: UTC+1 (CET)
  - Summer (DST): UTC+2 (CEST)

Čelebić is a village in the Township of Livno in Canton 10 of the Federation of Bosnia and Herzegovina, an entity of Bosnia and Herzegovina. It is connected to Kovačić and is located on the road between Bosansko Grahovo and Livno. The village was one of several sites of large-scale violence against Serbian civilians during the Second World War. During the Bosnian War the village was divided between Serb and Croat forces until December 1994, when the Croats took control of the village.

== History ==
=== Second World War ===
During the Second World War, the village of Čelebić was the site of mass killings carried out by Ustaše forces as part of the genocide of Serbs across the territory of the Independent State of Croatia. On July 29 and 30, 1941, coinciding with the Eastern Orthodox feast day of Ognjena Marija (Fiery Mary), 396 ethnic Serb civilians were killed in Čelebić. The majority of the victims were women, children and the elderly.

The killings took place at several sites in and around the village, including the local school and the Bikuša site. In many cases, victims were confined to the school building before being executed or transported to mass graves. Some were buried at Barjak, a hill above Čelebić, while others were killed in the surrounding area such as the nearby village of Lusnić or thrown into the "Bikuša" pit.

Sources report that infants and young children were among the victims, five of whom had not even reached the age of one year, and that entire families perished during the violence. Lists of those killed include hundreds of named individuals from families such as Vujanović, Erceg, Crnogorac, Radić, Kozomara, Milutin and Šunjka. According to postwar testimonies and local accounts, the events were primarily carried out by Ustaša units and involved the participation of some individuals from neighbouring communities. Some local Croats are noted in memorial literature for attempting to protect their Serb neighbours at the risk of their own lives.

After the war, the authorities of the Socialist Federal Republic of Yugoslavia constructed a memorial at Barjak. While the monument marked the location of the mass graves, the commemorative inscription was generalized per the official policy of promoting brotherhood and unity among Yugoslavia’s nationalities. As a result, the ethnic identity of the victims and the perpetrators was not explicitly stated. Locally, the site was often referred to as the "Partisan cemetery," although the deceased were civilians and not combatants. The school building where many of the killings occurred resumed its function as an educational facility in the postwar years. Generations of children, including descendants of the victims, attended classes in the same building. According to accounts from residents and descendants, no formal recognition or commemoration of the 1941 events was established at the school, and the subject was rarely discussed in public life.

In recent years, efforts have been made by descendants of the victims and members of the diaspora to restore the memorial at Barjak, damaged in the 1990s. The restoration project includes new signage, the reconstruction of damaged elements and the addition of inscribed marble plaques listing the names of those killed.

=== Bosnian War ===
At the end of 1991, the village of Čelebić, along with Donji Rujani represented a line which divided territories under Croat and Serb control and signified the administrative reach of the Municipality of Livno, held by the Croats. In December 1991, the Serbs established checkpoints in Čelebić and Čaprazlije, seceding the villages from the municipal control. As a response, the Croats established checkpoints towards Bosansko Grahovo and Glamoč, in the villages of Donji Rujani, the western parts of Čelebić and south of the Korićina mountain pass.

The Serb forces prepared for an offensive towards Livno in April 1992. Ferdinand Sučić was appointed commander of the Croat defence in Čelebić. Croat forces in Čelebić were composed of the two platoons of the 3rd Battalion of the Croatian Defence Council (HVO) in the nearby fields near the road and in the hills above the village. In the village, the Croats stationed an anti-tank platoon, while an infantry platoon was located beneath the mountain Velika Golija east of the village. In total, the Croat forces numbered around 180 soldiers.

The Serb offensive from Bosansko Grahovo through Čelebić towards Livno started on 23 April 1992. The Serbs prepared for the offensive with artillery fire and started the offensive at 09:00 AM, with an armoured company of 32 tanks and other armoured vehicles. After the attack started, the Croats reinforced their defences with an additional two platoons from Ljubunčić and Žirović. With the help of mortar fire, they managed to stop the tank attack by damaging several tanks. With the Serbs' intent to save the damaged tanks, the confrontation turned into fierce fighting lasting for hours. After losing anti-tank weapons, some 40 Croat soldiers retreated towards Kovačić. Sučić was killed during the attack. The Serbs managed to save the damaged tanks. After an artillery cannonade, in a manoeuvre commanded by Ante Gotovina, the Croats returned to their positions in Čelebić the next day. The Croats had five killed soldiers, while the Serbs had four killed soldiers, with several wounded on both sides.

The line between the Serb and the Croat forces remained still until 13 June 1992, after the HVO artillery destroyed several Serb armoured vehicles, after which Serbs retreated in the northwestern part of the village. After that, the line between the Serb and the Croat forces remained unchanged until December 1994. During the Operation Winter '94, on 2 December 1994, the Croat forces started a barrage on Ljuta Glavica hill above the village, while on 4 December, they managed to secure it, semicircling the Serb forces in the village, forcing them to retreat.

== Demographics ==
Ethnic group	Population 1961	%	Population 1971	%	Population 1981	%	Population 1991	%	Population 2013	%
Croats	467	69.60	357	63.19	510	65.98	316	70.54	121	90.98
Serbs	199	29.66	169	29.91	262	33.89	131	29.24	12	9.02
Others	5	0.75	39	6.90	1	0.13	1	0.22	0	0
Total	671		565		773		448		133	

== Bibliography ==
=== Books ===
- Ethnicity/National Affiliation, Religion and Mother Tongue (PDF). Sarajevo: Agency for Statistics of Bosnia and Herzegovina. 2019.
- Nacionalni sastav stanovništva [The national composition of the population] (PDF) (in Serbo-Croatian). Sarajevo: Državni zavod za statistiku Republike Bosne i Hercegovine. 1994.
- Nacionalni sastav stanovništva SFR Jugoslavije [The national composition of the population of the FNR Yugoslavia] (PDF) (in Serbo-Croatian). Vol. 1. Belgrade: Savezni zavod za statistiku. 1994.
- Nacionalni sastav stanovništva SFR Jugoslavije [The national composition of the population of the FNR Yugoslavia] (PDF) (in Serbo-Croatian). Vol. 2. Belgrade: Savezni zavod za statistiku. 1994.
- Nacionalni sastav stanovništva FNR Jugoslavije [The national composition of the population of the FNR Yugoslavia] (PDF) (in Serbo-Croatian). Vol. 3. Belgrade: Savezni zavod za statistiku. 1994.

=== Journals ===
- Marijan, Davor (2021). "Borbe za Livno u travnju 1992. godine - prilog istraživanju" [The battles for Livno in April 1992 - a contribution to research]. Hercegovina (in Croatian) (7): 275–308.
