= Bojmunte =

- Village
- Location within Bosnia and Herzegovina
- Coordinates: 43°58′N 16°44′E
- Country: Bosnia and Herzegovina
- Entity: Federation of Bosnia and Herzegovina
- Canton: Canton 10
- Township: Livno

Area
  - Total: 15.58 km^{2} (6.02 sq mi)

Population (2013)
  - Total: 19
  - Density: 1.2/km^{2} (3.2/sq mi)
- Time zone: UTC+1 (CET)
  - Summer (DST): UTC+2 (CEST)

Bojmunte (Serbian Cyrillic: Бојмунте) is a village in the Township of Livno in Canton 10 of the Federation of Bosnia and Herzegovina, an entity of Bosnia and Herzegovina.

== Geography ==
It is located between the villages of Čelebić and Radanovci at the beginning of a local road from the regional Livno–Bosansko Grahovo road.

== Demographic history ==
In 1991, the village population numbered 91 people, of whom all were ethnic Serbs.

According to the 2013 census, its population was 19, all Serbs.

== Bibliography ==
- Ethnicity/National Affiliation, Religion and Mother Tongue (PDF). Sarajevo: Agency for Statistics of Bosnia and Herzegovina. 2019.
