= Zagoričani =

- Village
- Location within Bosnia and Herzegovina
- Coordinates: 43°47′11″N 17°04′55″E
- Country: Bosnia and Herzegovina
- Entity: Federation of Bosnia and Herzegovina
- Canton: Canton 10
- Township: Livno

Area
  - Total: 30.01 km^{2} (11.59 sq mi)

Population (2013)
  - Total: 761
  - Density: 25.4/km^{2} (65.7/sq mi)
- Time zone: UTC+1 (CET)
  - Summer (DST): UTC+2 (CEST)

Zagoričani is a village in the Township of Livno in Canton 10of the Federation of Bosnia and Herzegovina, an entity of Bosnia and Herzegovina.

== History ==
Village of Zagoričani was mentioned for the first time in 1400 in a grant of Stjepan Ostoja to Hrvoje Vukčić Hrvatinić. In the list of neighbouring places of Livno from 1711, there were 15 villages mentioned, including Zagoričani. Bishop Pavao Dragičević mentioned Zagoričani along with Potočani as one of the Croat-populated villages of Livno, along with 35 other villages.

Zagoričani and Potočani were originally one village, known as Podgreda. This village was scattered, with many hamlets. People who came to town, Livno, were serfs at the time. As the population from Zagoričani went from the hill, the townsfolk named them "Zagoričani" (people from the mountain); thus, the village was named by its residents.

== Demographics ==
According to the 2013 census, its population was 761.

Ethnicity in 2013
| Ethnicity | Number | Percentage |
|---|---|---|
| Croats | 759 | 99.7% |
| other/undeclared | 2 | 0.3% |
| Total | 761 | 100% |

== Bibliography ==
- Ethnicity/National Affiliation, Religion and Mother Tongue (PDF). Sarajevo: Agency for Statistics of Bosnia and Herzegovina. 2019. Archived from the original (PDF) on 2020-07-25.
