= Bogdaše =

- Village
- Location within Bosnia and Herzegovina
- Coordinates: 44°02′N 16°41′E
- Country: Bosnia and Herzegovina
- Entity: Federation of Bosnia and Herzegovina
- Canton: Canton 10
- Township: Livno

Area
  - Total: 15.33 km^{2} (5.92 sq mi)

Population (2013)
  - Total: 18
  - Density: 1.2/km^{2} (3.0/sq mi)
- Time zone: UTC+1 (CET)
  - Summer (DST): UTC+2 (CEST)

Bogdaše is a village in the Township of Livno in Canton 10 of the Federation of Bosnia and Herzegovina, an entity of Bosnia and Herzegovina.

== Name ==
The name means "God gives" coming from the words "Bog" meaning God, and "daše" meaning gives.

== Demographics ==
According to the 2013 census, its population was 18, all Serbs.

== Bibliography ==
- Ethnicity/National Affiliation, Religion and Mother Tongue (PDF). Sarajevo: Agency for Statistics of Bosnia and Herzegovina. 2019.
