= Potok, Livno =

Potok
- Village
- Location within Bosnia and Herzegovina
- Coordinates: 43.775170°N 16.984119°E
- Country: Bosnia and Herzegovina
- Entity: Federation of Bosnia and Herzegovina
- Canton: Canton 10
- Township: Livno

Area
  - Total: 3.78 km^{2} (1.46 sq mi)

Population (2013)
  - Total: 239
  - Density: 63.2/km^{2} (164/sq mi)
- Time zone: UTC+1 (CET)
  - Summer (DST): UTC+2 (CEST)

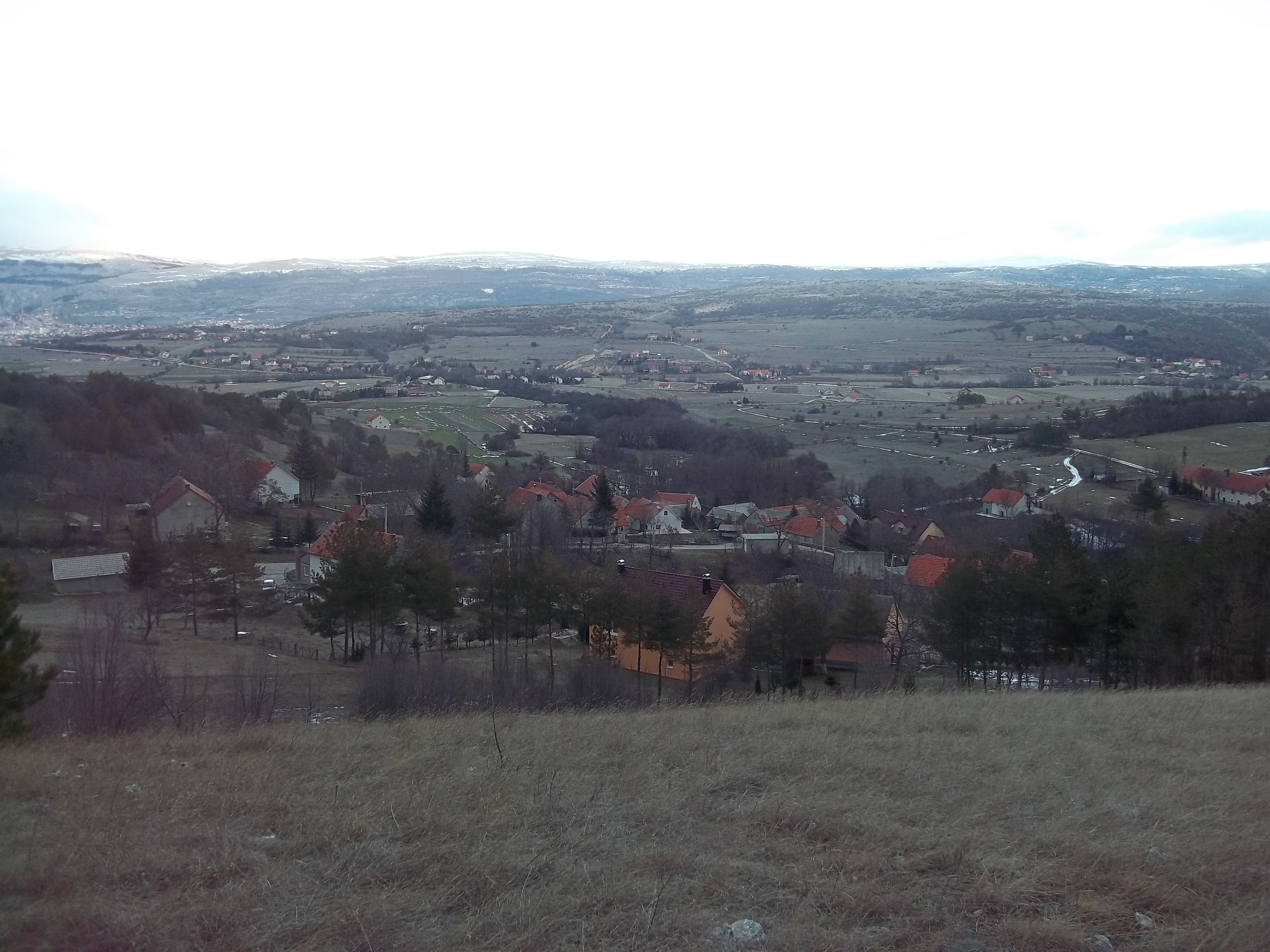
Potok, Livno

Potok is a village in the Livno in Canton 10 of the Federation of Bosnia and Herzegovina, an entity of Bosnia and Herzegovina.

== Demographics ==
According to the 2013 census, its population was 239.

Ethnicity in 2013
Ethnicity	Number	Percentage
Croats	235	98.3%
Serbs	2	0.8%
Bosniaks	2	0.8%
Total	239	100%

== Bibliography ==
- Ethnicity/National Affiliation, Religion and Mother Tongue (PDF). Sarajevo: Agency for Statistics of Bosnia and Herzegovina. 2019.
