= Prisap =

- Village
- Location within Bosnia and Herzegovina
- Coordinates: 43°51′N 16°54′E
- Country: Bosnia and Herzegovina
- Entity: Federation of Bosnia and Herzegovina
- Canton: Canton 10
- Township: Livno

Area
  - Total: 13.56 km^{2} (5.24 sq mi)

Population (2013)
  - Total: 352
  - Density: 26.0/km^{2} (67.2/sq mi)
- Time zone: UTC+1 (CET)
  - Summer (DST): UTC+2 (CEST)

Prisap is a village in the Livno in Canton 10 of the Federation of Bosnia and Herzegovina, an entity of Bosnia and Herzegovina.

== Demographics ==
According to the 2013 census, its population was 352.

Ethnicity in 2013
Ethnicity	Number	Percentage
Croats	349	99.1%
other/undeclared	3	0.9%
Total	352	100%

== Bibliography ==
- Ethnicity/National Affiliation, Religion and Mother Tongue (PDF). Sarajevo: Agency for Statistics of Bosnia and Herzegovina. 2019.
