= Komorani =

- Village
- Komorani within Bosnia and Herzegovina
- Coordinates: 43°49′N 16°56′E
- Country: Bosnia and Herzegovina
- Entity: Federation of Bosnia and Herzegovina
- Canton: Canton 10
- Township: Livno

Area
  - Total: 7.80 km^{2} (3.01 sq mi)

Population (2013)
  - Total: 236
  - Density: 30.3/km^{2} (78.4/sq mi)
- Time zone: UTC+1 (CET)
  - Summer (DST): UTC+2 (CEST)

Komorani is a village in the Township of Livno in Canton 10 of the Federation of Bosnia and Herzegovina, an entity of Bosnia and Herzegovina.

== Demographics ==
According to the 2013 census, its population was 236.

Ethnicity in 2013
Ethnicity	Number	Percentage
Croats	145	61.4%
Bosniaks	88	37.3%
Serbs	3	1.3%
Total	236	100%

== Bibliography ==
- Ethnicity/National Affiliation, Religion and Mother Tongue (PDF). Sarajevo: Agency for Statistics of Bosnia and Herzegovina. 2019.
