= Veliki Guber =

- Village
- Location within Bosnia and Herzegovina
- Coordinates: 43°49′N 16°57′E
- Country: Bosnia and Herzegovina
- Entity: Federation of Bosnia and Herzegovina
- Canton: Canton 10
- Township: Livno

Area
  - Total: 4.82 km^{2} (1.86 sq mi)

Population (2013)
  - Total: 629
  - Density: 130/km^{2} (338/sq mi)
- Time zone: UTC+1 (CET)
  - Summer (DST): UTC+2 (CEST)

Veliki Guber is a village in the Township of Livno in Canton 10 of the Federation of Bosnia and Herzegovina, an entity of Bosnia and Herzegovina.

== Demographics ==
According to the 2013 census, its population was 629.

Ethnicity in 2013
Ethnicity	Number	Percentage
Croats	472	75.0%
Bosniaks	126	20.0%
Serbs	23	3.7%
other/undeclared	8	1.3%
Total	629	100%

== Bibliography ==
- Ethnicity/National Affiliation, Religion and Mother Tongue (PDF). Sarajevo: Agency for Statistics of Bosnia and Herzegovina. 2019.
