= Dobro, Livno =

Dobro
- Village
- Location within Bosnia and Herzegovina
- Coordinates: 43°47′N 17°03′E
- Country: Bosnia and Herzegovina
- Entity: Federation of Bosnia and Herzegovina
- Canton: Canton 10
- Township: Livno

Area
  - Total: 13.85 km^{2} (5.35 sq mi)

Population (2013)
  - Total: 707
  - Density: 51.0/km^{2} (132/sq mi)
- Time zone: UTC+1 (CET)
  - Summer (DST): UTC+2 (CEST)

Dobro is a village in the Township of Livno in Canton 10 of the Federation of Bosnia and Herzegovina, an entity of Bosnia and Herzegovina. The name of the village means "good" in the native language

== Demographics ==
According to the 2013 census, its population was 707.

Ethnicity in 2013
Ethnicity	Number	Percentage
Croats	705	99.7%
other/undeclared	2	0.3%
Total	707	100%

== Bibliography ==
- Ethnicity/National Affiliation, Religion and Mother Tongue (PDF). Sarajevo: Agency for Statistics of Bosnia and Herzegovina. 2019.
