= Drinova Međa =

- Village
- Location within Bosnia and Herzegovina
- Coordinates: 43°48′N 17°00′E
- Country: Bosnia and Herzegovina
- Entity: Federation of Bosnia and Herzegovina
- Canton: Canton 10
- Township: Livno

Area
  - Total: 1.98 km^{2} (0.76 sq mi)

Population (2013)
  - Total: 208
  - Density: 105/km^{2} (272/sq mi)
- Time zone: UTC+1 (CET)
  - Summer (DST): UTC+2 (CEST)

Drinova Međa is a village in the Township of Livno in Canton 10 of the Federation of Bosnia and Herzegovina, an entity of Bosnia and Herzegovina.

== Demographics ==
According to the 2013 census, its population was 208.

Ethnicity in 2013
Ethnicity	Number	Percentage
Croats	205	98.6%
Serbs	2	1.0%
Bosniaks	1	0.5%
Total	208	100%

== Bibliography ==
- Ethnicity/National Affiliation, Religion and Mother Tongue (PDF). Sarajevo: Agency for Statistics of Bosnia and Herzegovina. 2019.
