= Provo, Livno =

Provo
- Village
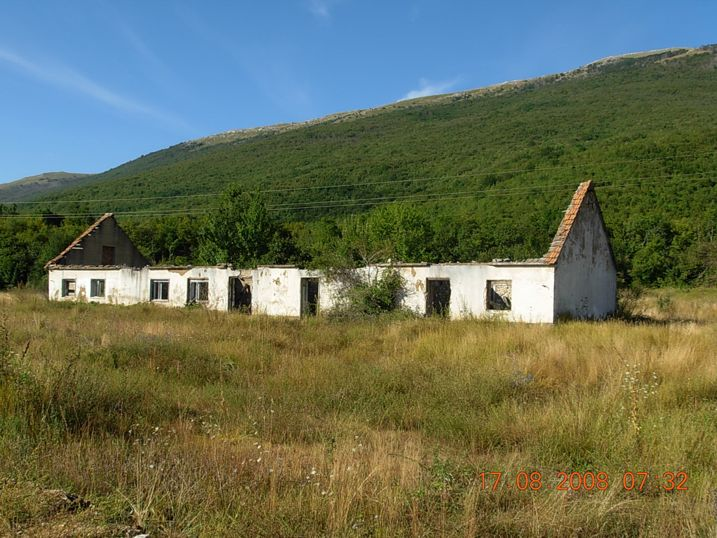
- Ruins of the elementary school in Provo

- Location within Bosnia and Herzegovina
- Coordinates: 43.937402°N 16.66193°E
- Country: Bosnia and Herzegovina
- Entity: Federation of Bosnia and Herzegovina
- Canton: Canton 10
- Township: Livno

Area
  - Total: 25.65 km^{2} (9.90 sq mi)

Population (2013)
  - Total: 12
  - Density: 0.47/km^{2} (1.2/sq mi)
- Time zone: UTC+1 (CET)
  - Summer (DST): UTC+2 (CEST)

Provo is a village in the Township of Livno in Canton 10 of the Federation of Bosnia and Herzegovina, an entity of Bosnia and Herzegovina.

== Demographics ==
According to the 2013 census, its population was 12.

Ethnicity in 2013
Ethnicity	Number	Percentage
Serbs	9	75.0%
other/undeclared	3	25.0%
Total	12	100%

== Bibliography ==
- Ethnicity/National Affiliation, Religion and Mother Tongue (PDF). Sarajevo: Agency for Statistics of Bosnia and Herzegovina. 2019.
