= Sajković =

- Village
- Location within Bosnia and Herzegovina
- Coordinates: 43°58′32″N 16°38′32″E
- Country: Bosnia and Herzegovina
- Entity: Federation of Bosnia and Herzegovina
- Canton: Canton 10
- Township: Livno

Area
  - Total: 28.85 km^{2} (11.14 sq mi)

Population (2013)
  - Total: 34
  - Density: 1.2/km^{2} (3.1/sq mi)
- Time zone: UTC+1 (CET)
  - Summer (DST): UTC+2 (CEST)

Sajković is a village in the Township of Livno in Canton 10 of the Federation of Bosnia and Herzegovina, an entity of Bosnia and Herzegovina.

== Demographics ==
According to the 2013 census, its population was 34.

Ethnicity in 2013
Ethnicity	Number	Percentage
Serbs	32	94.1%
Croats	1	2.9%
other/undeclared	1	2.9%
Total	34	100%

== Bibliography ==
- Ethnicity/National Affiliation, Religion and Mother Tongue (PDF). Sarajevo: Agency for Statistics of Bosnia and Herzegovina. 2019.
