= Podgreda, Livno =

Podgreda
- Village
- Location within Bosnia and Herzegovina
- Coordinates: 43°49′00″N 17°03′25″E
- Country: Bosnia and Herzegovina
- Entity: Federation of Bosnia and Herzegovina
- Canton: Canton 10
- Township: Livno

Area
  - Total: 7.76 km^{2} (3.00 sq mi)

Population (2013)
  - Total: 89
  - Density: 11/km^{2} (30/sq mi)
- Time zone: UTC+1 (CET)
  - Summer (DST): UTC+2 (CEST)

Podgreda is a village in the Township of Livno in Canton 10 of the Federation of Bosnia and Herzegovina, an entity of Bosnia and Herzegovina.

== Demographics ==
According to the 2013 census, its population was 89.

Ethnicity in 2013
Ethnicity	Number	Percentage
Croats	80	89.9%
Bosniaks	9	10.1%
Total	89	100%

== Bibliography ==
- Ethnicity/National Affiliation, Religion and Mother Tongue (PDF). Sarajevo: Agency for Statistics of Bosnia and Herzegovina. 2019.
