= Podhum, Livno =

Podhum
- Village
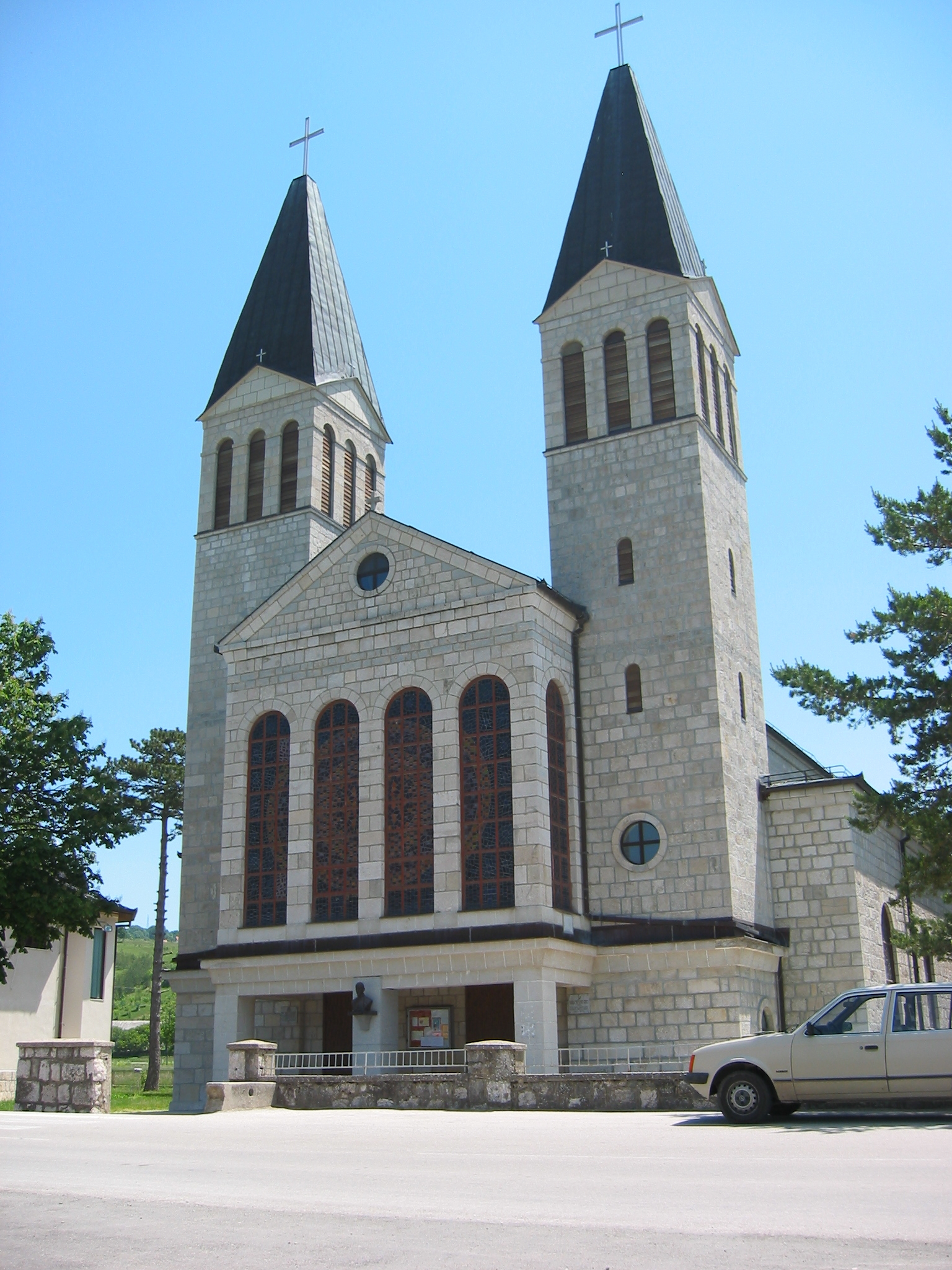

- Location within Bosnia and Herzegovina
- Coordinates: 43°44′12″N 16°59′5″E
- Country: Bosnia and Herzegovina
- Entity: Federation of Bosnia and Herzegovina
- Canton: Canton 10
- Township: Livno

Area
  - Total: 9.07 km^{2} (3.50 sq mi)

Population (2013)
  - Total: 684
  - Density: 75.4/km^{2} (195/sq mi)
- Time zone: UTC+1 (CET)
  - Summer (DST): UTC+2 (CEST)

Podhum is a village in the Township of Livno in Canton 10, the Federation of Bosnia and Herzegovina, Bosnia and Herzegovina.

Poet and children's book author Bisera Alikadić (born 1939) was born in Podhum.

== Demographics ==
Podhum
year of census	1991	1981	1971
Croats	744 (75,15%)	831 (74,59%)	1,210 (79,76%)
Muslims	227 (22,92%)	278 (24,95%)	299 (19,70%)
Serbs	0	1 (0,08%)	1 (0,06%)
Yugoslavs	6 (0,60%)	1 (0,08%)	0
others and unknown	13 (1,31%)	3 (0,26%)	7 (0,46%)
total	990	1,114	1,517

According to the 2013 census, its population was 684.

Ethnicity in 2013
Ethnicity	Number	Percentage
Croats	563	82.3%
Bosniaks	109	15.9%
other/undeclared	12	1.8%
Total	684	100%

== Bibliography ==
- Ethnicity/National Affiliation, Religion and Mother Tongue (PDF). Sarajevo: Agency for Statistics of Bosnia and Herzegovina. 2019.
