= Suhača, Livno =

Suhača
- Village
- Location within Bosnia and Herzegovina
- Coordinates: 43°50′50″N 16°58′12″E
- Country: Bosnia and Herzegovina
- Entity: Federation of Bosnia and Herzegovina
- Canton: Canton 10
- Township: Livno

Area
  - Total: 9.21 km^{2} (3.56 sq mi)

Population (2013)
  - Total: 267
  - Density: 29.0/km^{2} (75.1/sq mi)
- Time zone: UTC+1 (CET)
  - Summer (DST): UTC+2 (CEST)

Suhača is a village in the Township of Livno in Canton 10 of the Federation of Bosnia and Herzegovina, an entity of Bosnia and Herzegovina.

== Demographics ==
According to the 2013 census, its population was 267.

Ethnicity in 2013
Ethnicity	Number	Percentage
Croats	261	97.8%
Bosniaks	5	1.9%
other/undeclared	1	0.4%
Total	267	100%

== Bibliography ==
- Ethnicity/National Affiliation, Religion and Mother Tongue (PDF). Sarajevo: Agency for Statistics of Bosnia and Herzegovina. 2019.
