= Potkraj, Livno =

Potkraj
- Village
- Location within Bosnia and Herzegovina
- Coordinates: 43°44′59″N 17°04′26″E
- Country: Bosnia and Herzegovina
- Entity: Federation of Bosnia and Herzegovina
- Canton: Canton 10
- Township: Livno

Area
  - Total: 21.00 km^{2} (8.11 sq mi)

Population (2013)
  - Total: 390
  - Density: 19/km^{2} (48/sq mi)
- Time zone: UTC+1 (CET)
  - Summer (DST): UTC+2 (CEST)

Potkraj is a village in the Township of Livno in Canton 10 of the Federation of Bosnia and Herzegovina, an entity of Bosnia and Herzegovina.

== Demographics ==
According to the 2013 census, its population was 390.

Ethnicity in 2013
Ethnicity	Number	Percentage
Croats	282	72.3%
Bosniaks	100	25.6%
Serbs	1	0.3%
other/undeclared	7	1.8%
Total	390	100%

== Bibliography ==
- Ethnicity/National Affiliation, Religion and Mother Tongue (PDF). Sarajevo: Agency for Statistics of Bosnia and Herzegovina. 2019.
