= Orguz =

- Village
- Interactive map of Orguz
- Location within Bosnia and Herzegovina
- Coordinates: 43°46′N 16°52′E
- Country: Bosnia and Herzegovina
- Entity: Federation of Bosnia and Herzegovina
- Canton: Canton 10
- Township: Livno

Area
  - Total: 11.49 km^{2} (4.44 sq mi)

Population (2013)
  - Total: 695
  - Density: 60.5/km^{2} (157/sq mi)
- Time zone: UTC+1 (CET)
  - Summer (DST): UTC+2 (CEST)

Orguz is a village in the Township of Livno in Canton 10 of the Federation of Bosnia and Herzegovina, an entity of Bosnia and Herzegovina.

== Demographics ==
According to the 2013 census, its population was 695.

Ethnicity in 2013
| Ethnicity | Number | Percentage |
|---|---|---|
| Croats | 693 | 99.7% |
| Serbs | 1 | 0.1% |
| Bosniaks | 1 | 0.1% |
| Total | 695 | 100% |

== Bibliography ==
- Ethnicity/National Affiliation, Religion and Mother Tongue (PDF). Sarajevo: Agency for Statistics of Bosnia and Herzegovina. 2019.
