= Smričani =

- Village
- Location within Bosnia and Herzegovina
- Coordinates: 43°46′N 17°00′E
- Country: Bosnia and Herzegovina
- Entity: Federation of Bosnia and Herzegovina
- Canton: Canton 10
- Township: Livno

Area
  - Total: 9.01 km^{2} (3.48 sq mi)

Population (2013)
  - Total: 579
  - Density: 64.3/km^{2} (166/sq mi)
- Time zone: UTC+1 (CET)
  - Summer (DST): UTC+2 (CEST)

Smričani is a village in the Township of Livno in Canton 10 of the Federation of Bosnia and Herzegovina, an entity of Bosnia and Herzegovina.

== Demographics ==
According to the 2013 census, its population was 579.

Ethnicity in 2013
Ethnicity	Number	Percentage
Croats	576	99.5%
Serbs	1	0.2%
other/undeclared	2	0.3%
Total	579	100%

== Bibliography ==
- Ethnicity/National Affiliation, Religion and Mother Tongue (PDF). Sarajevo: Agency for Statistics of Bosnia and Herzegovina. 2019.
