= Grgurići =

- Village
- Location within Bosnia and Herzegovina
- Coordinates: 43°45′26″N 17°03′25″E
- Country: Bosnia and Herzegovina
- Entity: Federation of Bosnia and Herzegovina
- Canton: Canton 10
- Township: Livno

Area
  - Total: 10.19 km^{2} (3.93 sq mi)

Population (2013)
  - Total: 705
  - Density: 69.2/km^{2} (179/sq mi)
- Time zone: UTC+1 (CET)
  - Summer (DST): UTC+2 (CEST)

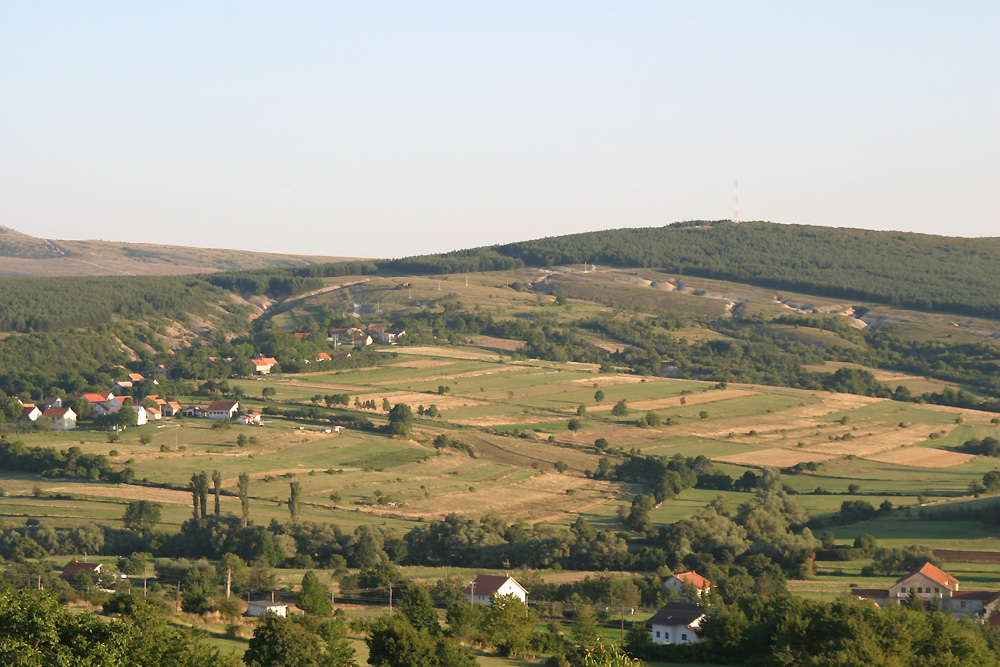
Vidoši and Gregurići.

Grgurići is a village in the Township of Livno in Canton 10 of the Federation of Bosnia and Herzegovina, an entity of Bosnia and Herzegovina.

== Demographics ==
According to the 2013 census, its population was 705.

Ethnicity in 2013
Ethnicity	Number	Percentage
Croats	702	99.6%
Serbs	1	0.1%
Bosniaks	1	0.1%
other/undeclared	1	0.1%
Total	705	100%

== Bibliography ==
- Ethnicity/National Affiliation, Religion and Mother Tongue (PDF). Sarajevo: Agency for Statistics of Bosnia and Herzegovina. 2019.
