= Veliki Kablići =

- Village
- Location within Bosnia and Herzegovina
- Coordinates: 43°51′N 16°58′E
- Country: Bosnia and Herzegovina
- Entity: Federation of Bosnia and Herzegovina
- Canton: Canton 10
- Township: Livno

Area
  - Total: 11.52 km^{2} (4.45 sq mi)

Population (2013)
  - Total: 718
  - Density: 62.3/km^{2} (161/sq mi)
- Time zone: UTC+1 (CET)
  - Summer (DST): UTC+2 (CEST)

Veliki Kablići is a village in the Township of Livno in Canton 10 of the Federation of Bosnia and Herzegovina, an entity of Bosnia and Herzegovina.

== Demographics ==
According to the 2013 census, its population was 718.

Ethnicity in 2013
Ethnicity	Number	Percentage
Croats	606	84.4%
Bosniaks	99	13.8%
other/undeclared	13	1.8%
Total	718	100%

== Bibliography ==
- Ethnicity/National Affiliation, Religion and Mother Tongue (PDF). Sarajevo: Agency for Statistics of Bosnia and Herzegovina. 2019.
