= Zastinje, Livno =

Zastinje
- Village
- Location within Bosnia and Herzegovina
- Coordinates: 43°50′02″N 17°00′04″E
- Country: Bosnia and Herzegovina
- Entity: Federation of Bosnia and Herzegovina
- Canton: Canton 10
- Township: Livno

Area
  - Total: 22.08 km^{2} (8.53 sq mi)

Population (2013)
  - Total: 744
  - Density: 33.7/km^{2} (87.3/sq mi)
- Time zone: UTC+1 (CET)
  - Summer (DST): UTC+2 (CEST)

Zastinje is a village in the Township of Livno in Canton 10 of the Federation of Bosnia and Herzegovina, an entity of Bosnia and Herzegovina.

== Demographics ==
According to the 2013 census, its population was 744.

Ethnicity in 2013
Ethnicity	Number	Percentage
Croats	624	83.9%
Bosniaks	104	14.0%
Serbs	10	1.3%
other/undeclared	6	0.8%
Total	744	100%

== Bibliography ==
- Ethnicity/National Affiliation, Religion and Mother Tongue (PDF). Sarajevo: Agency for Statistics of Bosnia and Herzegovina. 2019. Archived from the original (PDF) on 2020-07-25.
