= Lištani =

- Village
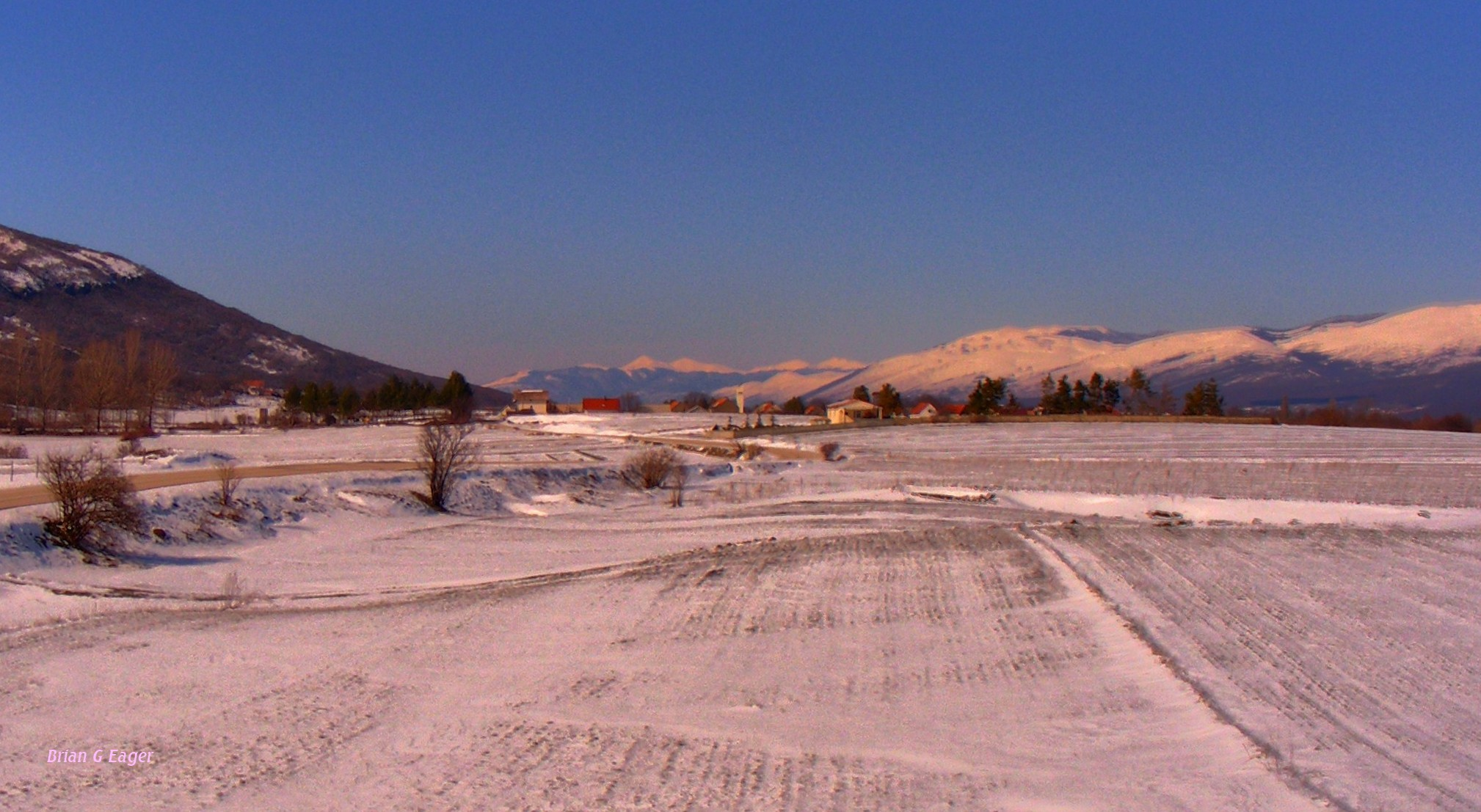

- Location within Bosnia and Herzegovina
- Coordinates: 43°53′N 16°47′E
- Country: Bosnia and Herzegovina
- Entity: Federation of Bosnia and Herzegovina
- Canton: Canton 10
- Township: Livno

Area
  - Total: 17.27 km^{2} (6.67 sq mi)

Population (2013)
  - Total: 546
  - Density: 31.6/km^{2} (81.9/sq mi)
- Time zone: UTC+1 (CET)
  - Summer (DST): UTC+2 (CEST)

Lištani is a village in the Township of Livno in Canton 10 of the Federation of Bosnia and Herzegovina, an entity of Bosnia and Herzegovina.

== Demographics ==
According to the 2013 census, its population was 546.

Ethnicity in 2013
Ethnicity	Number	Percentage
Croats	542	99.3%
Bosniaks	2	0.4%
other/undeclared	2	0.4%
Total	546	100%

== Bibliography ==
- Ethnicity/National Affiliation, Religion and Mother Tongue (PDF). Sarajevo: Agency for Statistics of Bosnia and Herzegovina. 2019.
