= Žabljak, Livno =

Žabljak
- Village
- Location within Bosnia and Herzegovina
- Coordinates: 43°49′N 17°00′E
- Country: Bosnia and Herzegovina
- Entity: Federation of Bosnia and Herzegovina
- Canton: Canton 10
- Township: Livno

Area
  - Total: 10.92 km^{2} (4.22 sq mi)

Population (2013)
  - Total: 2,736
  - Density: 250.5/km^{2} (648.9/sq mi)
- Time zone: UTC+1 (CET)
  - Summer (DST): UTC+2 (CEST)

Žabljak is a village in the Township of Livno in Canton 10 of the Federation of Bosnia and Herzegovina, an entity of Bosnia and Herzegovina.

== Demographics ==
According to the 2013 census, its population was 2,736.

Ethnicity in 2013
Ethnicity	Number	Percentage
Croats	2,668	97.5%
Bosniaks	30	1.1%
Serbs	12	0.4%
other/undeclared	26	1.0%
Total	2,736	100%

== Bibliography ==
- Ethnicity/National Affiliation, Religion and Mother Tongue (PDF). Sarajevo: Agency for Statistics of Bosnia and Herzegovina. 2019.
