= Držanlije =

- Village
- Location within Bosnia and Herzegovina
- Coordinates: 43°47′N 16°58′E
- Country: Bosnia and Herzegovina
- Entity: Federation of Bosnia and Herzegovina
- Canton: Canton 10
- Township: Livno

Area
  - Total: 13.15 km^{2} (5.08 sq mi)

Population (2013)
  - Total: 541
  - Density: 41.1/km^{2} (107/sq mi)
- Time zone: UTC+1 (CET)
  - Summer (DST): UTC+2 (CEST)

Držanlije is a village in the Township of Livno in Canton 10 of the Federation of Bosnia and Herzegovina, an entity of Bosnia and Herzegovina.

== Demographics ==
According to the 2013 census, its population was 541.

Ethnicity in 2013
| Ethnicity | Number | Percentage |
|---|---|---|
| Croats | 532 | 98.3% |
| Serbs | 5 | 0.9% |
| Bosniaks | 3 | 0.6% |
| other/undeclared | 1 | 0.2% |
| Total | 541 | 100% |

== Bibliography ==
- Ethnicity/National Affiliation, Religion and Mother Tongue (PDF). Sarajevo: Agency for Statistics of Bosnia and Herzegovina. 2019.
