= Bilo Polje =

- Village
- Location within Bosnia and Herzegovina
- Coordinates: 43°42′27″N 16°58′56″E
- Country: Bosnia and Herzegovina
- Entity: Federation of Bosnia and Herzegovina
- Canton: Canton 10
- Township: Livno

Area
  - Total: 11.15 km^{2} (4.31 sq mi)

Population (2013)
  - Total: 82
  - Density: 7.4/km^{2} (19/sq mi)
- Time zone: UTC+1 (CET)
  - Summer (DST): UTC+2 (CEST)

Bilo Polje is a village in the Township of Livno in Canton 10 of the Federation of Bosnia and Herzegovina, an entity of Bosnia and Herzegovina. The name of the village translates to "white field", from the Ikavian dialect.

== Demographics ==
Like many villages in Bosnia and Herzegovina, Bilo Polje has experienced significant population changes due to migration, both historically (Ottoman and Austro-Hungarian periods) and during/after the 1990s war. Population size today is relatively small, and many families have members who live abroad, especially in Croatia, Germany, and Austria. According to the 2013 census, its population was 82, all Croats.

== Bibliography ==
- Ethnicity/National Affiliation, Religion and Mother Tongue (PDF). Sarajevo: Agency for Statistics of Bosnia and Herzegovina. 2019.
