= Odžak, Livno =

Odžak
- Village
- Location within Bosnia and Herzegovina
- Coordinates: 43°51′23″N 16°48′07″E
- Country: Bosnia and Herzegovina
- Entity: Federation of Bosnia and Herzegovina
- Canton: Canton 10
- Township: Livno

Area
  - Total: 32.80 km^{2} (12.66 sq mi)

Population (2013)
  - Total: 561
  - Density: 17.1/km^{2} (44.3/sq mi)
- Time zone: UTC+1 (CET)
  - Summer (DST): UTC+2 (CEST)

Odžak is a village in the Township of Livno in Canton 10 of the Federation of Bosnia and Herzegovina, an entity of Bosnia and Herzegovina.

== Demographics ==
According to the 2013 census, its population was 561.

Ethnicity in 2013
Ethnicity	Number	Percentage
Croats	559	99.65%
other/undeclared	2	0.4%
Total	561	100%

== Bibliography ==
- Ethnicity/National Affiliation, Religion and Mother Tongue (PDF). Sarajevo: Agency for Statistics of Bosnia and Herzegovina. 2019.
