= Misi =

Misi may refer to:

- MISI, marine ice sheet instability
- MISI University, a university in Malaysia
- Misi, Rovaniemi, a village in the Rovaniemi municipality in Lapland, Finland
- Miši, a village in the Township of Livno, Bosnia and Herzegovina
- a former acronym of the Moscow State University of Civil Engineering
