= Township of Livno =

Township of Livno Grad Livno (Croatian)
- Township
- Flag Coat of arms

- Location of the Municipality of Livno within Bosnia and Herzegovina
- Country: Bosnia and Herzegovina
- Entity: Federation of Bosnia and Herzegovina
- Canton: Canton 10
- Seat: Livno

Government
  - Mayor: Darko Čondrić (HDZ BiH)

Area
  - Total: 994 km^{2} (384 sq mi)

Population (2013)
  - Total: 34,133
  - Density: 34.3/km^{2} (88.9/sq mi)
- Demonym: Livnoan
- Website: livno.ba

Township of Livno (Croatian: Grad Livno) is a township in Canton 10 of the Federation of Bosnia and Herzegovina, an entity of Bosnia and Herzegovina. Its seat is in the town of Livno. According to the 2013 census, it has a population of 34,133.

== Settlements ==
• Bila • Bilo Polje • Bogdaše • Bojmunte • Čaić • Čaprazlije • Čelebić • Čuklić • Ćosanlije • Dobro • Donji Rujani • Drinova Međa • Držanlije • Golinjevo • Gornji Rujani • Grborezi • Grgurići • Gubin • Komorani • Kovačić • Lipa • Lištani • Livno • Lopatice • Lopatinac • Lusnić • Ljubunčić • Mali Guber • Mali Kablići • Miši • Odžak • Orguz • Podgradina • Podgreda • Podhum • Potkraj • Potočani • Potok • Priluka • Prisap • Prolog • Provo • Radanovci • Rapovine • Sajković • Smričani • Srđevići • Strupnić • Suhača • Tribić • Veliki Guber • Veliki Kablići • Vidoši • Vrbica • Vržerala • Zabrišće • Zagoričani • Zastinje • Žabljak • Žirović

== Demographics ==
=== Population ===
Population of settlements – Livno municipality
	Settlement	1948.	1953.	1961.	1971.	1981.	1991.	2013.
	Total	36,664	38,749	40,291	42,186	40,438	40,600	37,487
1	Bila						772	743
2	Čaić						367	315
3	Ćosanlije						311	300
4	Čuklić						328	406
5	Dobro						979	707
6	Donji Rujani						445	431
7	Drinova Međa						233	208
8	Držanlije						595	541
9	Golinjevo						861	718
10	Gornji Rujani						489	368
11	Grborezi						860	664
12	Grgurići						803	705
13	Komorani						243	236
14	Lipa						593	497
15	Lištani						490	546
16	Livno			5,181	7,207	9,002	10,080	9,045
17	Ljubunčić						711	519
18	Lopatice						281	283
19	Lusnić						419	310
20	Mali Guber						530	487
21	Miši						919	860
22	Odžak						509	561
23	Orguz						825	695
24	Podgradina						797	706
25	Podhum						990	684
26	Potkraj						423	390
27	Potočani						442	319
28	Potok						242	239
29	Priluka						885	685
30	Prisap						361	352
31	Prolog						1,180	861
32	Rapovine						316	310
33	Smričani						544	579
34	Srđevići						1,094	888
35	Strupnić						449	275
36	Suhača						292	267
37	Tribić						275	244
38	Veliki Guber						867	629
39	Veliki Kablići						817	718
40	Vidoši						569	474
41	Vržerala						901	648
42	Žabljak						1,885	2,736
43	Zabrišće						423	409
44	Zagoričani						702	761
45	Zastinje						897	744
46	Žirović						389	344

=== Ethnic composition ===
Ethnic composition
	2013.	1991.	1981.	1971.	1961.	1953.	1948.
Total	37,487 (100,0%)	40,600 (100,0%)	40,438 (100,0%)	42,186 (100,0%)	40,291 (100,0%)	38,749 (100,0%)	36,664 (100,0%)
Croats	29,273 (85,76%)	29,324 (72,23%)	28,918 (71,51%)	31,657 (75,04%)	31,133 (77,27%)	30,603 (78,98%)	29,647 (80,86%)
Bosniaks	4,138 (12,12%)	5,793 (14,27%)	4,418 (10,93%)	5,087 (12,06%)	2,068 (5,133%)		
Serbs	446 (1,307%)	3,913 (9,638%)	3,898 (9,639%)	4,791 (11,36%)	5,503 (13,66%)	5,204 (13,43%)	4,452 (12,14%)
Unaffiliated	137 (0,401%)						
Others	49 (0,144%)	445 (1,096%)	240 (0,594%)	159 (0,377%)	38 (0,094%)	2,942 (7,59%)	2,565 (7,00%)
Albanians	40 (0,117%)		25 (0,062%)	9 (0,021%)	5 (0,012%)		
Unknown	22 (0,064%)						
Roma	8 (0,023%)		2 (0,005%)				
Montenegrins	6 (0,018%)		41 (0,101%)	33 (0,078%)	44 (0,109%)		
Slovenes	6 (0,018%)		5 (0,012%)	6 (0,014%)	22 (0,055%)		
Macedonians	5 (0,015%)		7 (0,017%)	5 (0,012%)	7 (0,017%)		
Ukrainians	3 (0,009%)						
Yugoslavs		1,125 (2,771%)	2,881 (7,124%)	434 (1,029%)	1,471 (3,651%)		
Hungarians			3 (0,007%)	5 (0,012%)			

== Governance ==
The main local government of the township is the Township Council of Livno. The council has 31 members elected for a four-year term by proportional representation. Livno has its mayor who is the highest-ranking officer in the municipal government.

=== Structure of the Council ===
party	1997	2000	2004	2008	2012	2016
Croatian Democratic Union (HDZ)	20	20	16	8	11	15
Croatian Democratic Union 1990 (HDZ 1990)	-	-	-	5	6	7
Croatian Party of Rights (HSP)	-	-	1	1	3	-
Party of Democratic Action (SDA)	5	3	5	3	3	4
Social Democratic Party (SDP)	1	3	2	1	2	-
Croatian Peasant Party of Stjepan Radić (HSS SR)	-	-	-	-	1	-
Independent	2	-	-	-	1	
