= Potočani, Livno =

Potočani
- Village
- Location within Bosnia and Herzegovina
- Coordinates: 43°48′17″N 17°04′20″E
- Country: Bosnia and Herzegovina
- Entity: Federation of Bosnia and Herzegovina
- Canton: Canton 10
- Township: Livno

Area
  - Total: 41.27 km^{2} (15.93 sq mi)

Population (2013)
  - Total: 319
  - Density: 7.73/km^{2} (20.0/sq mi)
- Time zone: UTC+1 (CET)
  - Summer (DST): UTC+2 (CEST)

Potočani is a village in the Township of Livno in Canton 10 of the Federation of Bosnia and Herzegovina, an entity of Bosnia and Herzegovina.

== Demographics ==
According to the 2013 census, its population was 319.

Ethnicity in 2013
Ethnicity	Number	Percentage
Croats	317	99.4%
Serbs	1	0.3%
other/undeclared	1	0.3%
Total	319	100%

== Bibliography ==
- Ethnicity/National Affiliation, Religion and Mother Tongue (PDF). Sarajevo: Agency for Statistics of Bosnia and Herzegovina. 2019.
