= Čaprazlije =

- Village
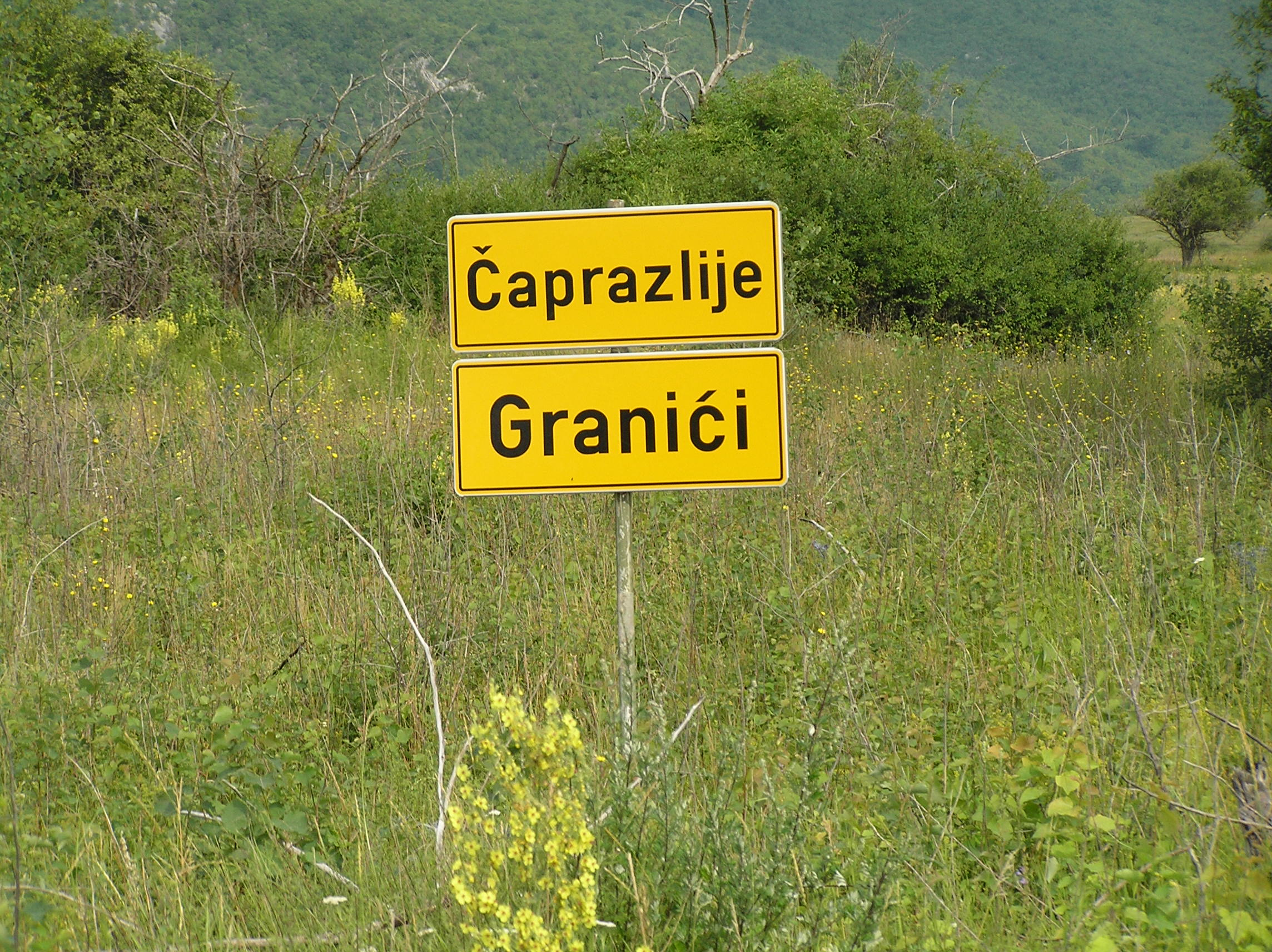

- Location within Bosnia and Herzegovina
- Coordinates: 43°54′08″N 16°41′49″E
- Country: Bosnia and Herzegovina
- Entity: Federation of Bosnia and Herzegovina
- Canton: Canton 10
- Township: Livno

Area
  - Total: 22.63 km^{2} (8.74 sq mi)

Population (2013)
  - Total: 51
  - Density: 2.3/km^{2} (5.8/sq mi)
- Time zone: UTC+1 (CET)
  - Summer (DST): UTC+2 (CEST)

Čaprazlije is a village in the Township of Livno in Canton 10 of the Federation of Bosnia and Herzegovina, an entity of Bosnia and Herzegovina. It is located 30km from Livno. It is located 5 km northwest of the village of Čelebić. Čaprazlije is situated north of Rujan and south of Prova. Bosnian Croats lived on the side of the village along Rujan, and Bosnian Serbs lived on the side towards Provo. Currently, there are no permanent residents in the village.

== History ==
The earliest written mention of the village of Čaprazlije was by Dragičev in 1741. He was visiting Catholic villages in the Livanjsko Polje. Friar Grga Lozić wrote more about the village and claimed that the village was once called Skučani. He wrote that the village was renamed after the death of Čaprazli Bey at Brižina. In some church documents, Čaprazlije is called Sarumiševo. Other documents state the word čep (meaning a plug in Serbo-Croatian) as an etymological root for the village's name. During flooding, typically from October to March, springs in the area get blocked with debris and a plug is formed, causing water to flood the surrounding land.

In 1768, 80 Catholics lived among the inhabitants. By 1813, the number had grown to 104. In 1768 the following families were residing in Čaprazlije: Barać, Glavurdić, Grame, Bošković, Hrgović, Jukić, Kujundžija, Ljubičić, Odak, Smoljić, Tokić.

== Demographics ==
According to the 2013 census, its population was 51.

Ethnicity in 2013
Ethnicity	Number	Percentage
Croats	38	74.5%
Serbs	13	25.5%
Total	51	100%

== Bibliography ==
- Ethnicity/National Affiliation, Religion and Mother Tongue (PDF). Sarajevo: Agency for Statistics of Bosnia and Herzegovina. 2019.
