= Miši =

- Village
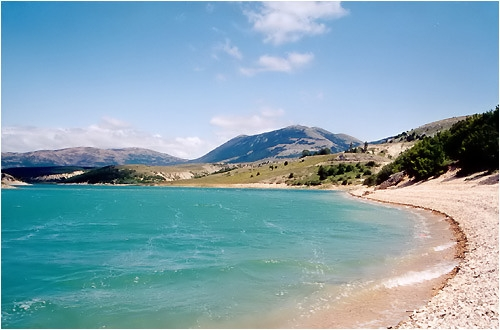
- Mandek Lake

- Location within Bosnia and Herzegovina
- Coordinates: 43°43′46″N 17°1′56″E
- Country: Bosnia and Herzegovina
- Entity: Federation of Bosnia and Herzegovina
- Canton: Canton 10
- Township: Livno

Area
  - Total: 9.00 km^{2} (3.47 sq mi)

Population (2013)
  - Total: 860
  - Density: 96/km^{2} (250/sq mi)
- Time zone: UTC+1 (CET)
  - Summer (DST): UTC+2 (CEST)

Miši is a village in the Township of Livno in Canton 10 of the Federation of Bosnia and Herzegovina, an entity of Bosnia and Herzegovina.

== Demographics ==
According to the 2013 census, its population was 860.

Ethnicity in 2013
Ethnicity	Number	Percentage
Croats	852	99.1%
other/undeclared	8	0.9%
Total	860	100%

== Bibliography ==
- Ethnicity/National Affiliation, Religion and Mother Tongue (PDF). Sarajevo: Agency for Statistics of Bosnia and Herzegovina. 2019.
