= Canton 10 =

Canton in Bosnia and Herzegovina

Canton 10 Kanton 10 Hercegbosanska županija Кантон 10
- Flag Coat of arms

- Status: Canton of the Federation of Bosnia and Herzegovina
- Capital: Livno (executive); Tomislavgrad (legislative)
- Largest city: Livno
- Official languages: Croatian Serbian Bosnian
- Ethnic groups (2013): 77.05% Croats; 13.01% Serbs; 9.58% Bosniaks
- Government: Parliamentary system
  - Prime Minister: Ivan Vukadin (HNP)
  - President of Assembly: Jozo Ćosić (HDZ 1990)
- Legislature: Assembly of Canton 10

Canton of the Federation of Bosnia and Herzegovina
  - Establishment: 12 June 1996

Area
  - Total: 4,934.9 km^{2} (1,905.4 sq mi)

Population
  - 2013 census: 83,844
- HDI (2023): ▲0.827 very high
- Currency: BAM
- Time zone: UTC+1 (CET)
  - Summer (DST): UTC+2 (CEST)
- Date format: dd-mm-yyyy
- Website vladahbz.com

Canton 10 (Croatian: Hercegbosanska županija, Serbian: Кантон 10, Bosnian: Kanton 10) is a federated state and one of the ten cantons of the Federation of Bosnia and Herzegovina, an entity of Bosnia and Herzegovina. It is the largest canton by area and eighth by population. The local government seat is in Livno, while the assembly is in Tomislavgrad. It is divided into five municipalities: Bosansko Grahovo, Drvar, Glamoč, Kupres, Tomislavgrad and one city, Livno.

The canton was established in 1996, following the Washington Agreement of 1994, which ended the Croat-Bosniak War. The majority of the population is ethnically Croat, living in the southern part of the canton, while the second-largest Serbs live in the northern part.

During the Bosnian War, the Croatian Defence Council (HVO) controlled the southern parts of the canton, while other parts, mostly in the north, were controlled by the Serb Army of Republika Srpska until 1994 when they were re-taken by the HVO with the support from the Croatian Army. Per the Washington Agreement, the territories were incorporated into the Croat-Bosniak Federation of Bosnia and Herzegovina. From 1996 to 2005, only Croats and Bosniaks were considered to be constituent nations within the canton, but since 2005, the Serbs are included among the constituent nations as well and are mentioned as such before the less numerous Bosniaks.

== Name, symbols and language ==
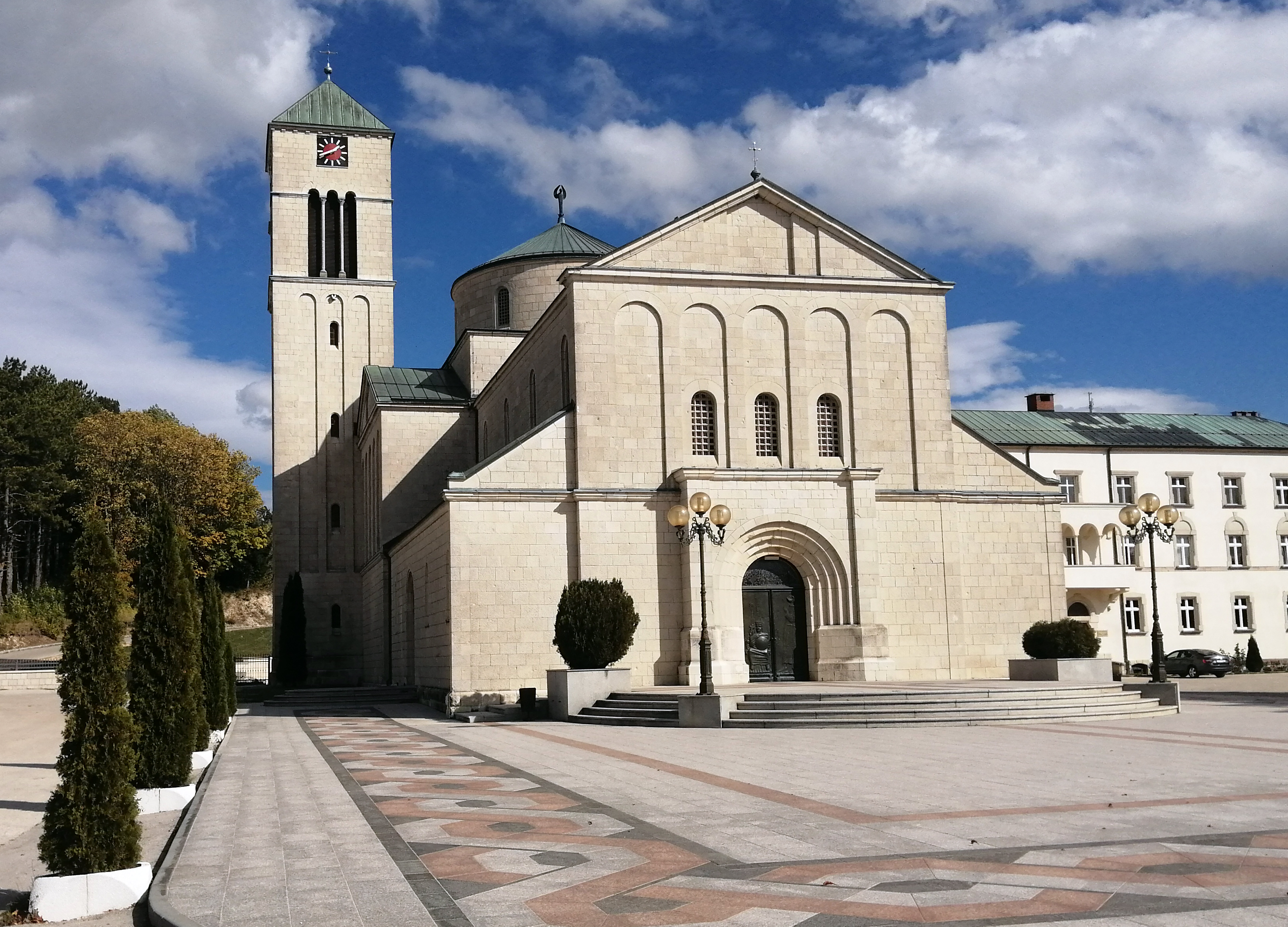
Church of Saint Nicholas Tavelic, a Croatian Franciscan friar

In Croatian, the term županija is used, while in Serbian and Bosnian, the term is kanton. The canton is officially referred to by the Federation of Bosnia and Herzegovina as Canton 10 (Kanton 10 or Županija 10). The local government refers to it as the Herzeg-Bosnia County and uses that name in the local constitution. This name was declared unconstitutional by the Constitutional Court of the Federation because the name is a characteristic shared by all the cantons in the sense that all of them are within Bosnia and Herzegovina. Other names used at the national level include North Herzegovina Canton (Sjevernohercegovački kanton, Sjevernohercegovačka županija) and Livno Canton (Livanjski kanton), after its capital.

The coat of arms of the canton under its constitution is a variant of the historical Croatian coat of arms. The flag is a horizontal tricolour of red, white and blue, with the coat of arms in the middle. These symbols were used by the former Croatian Republic of Herzeg-Bosnia. The West Herzegovina Canton also uses this flag and coat of arms. Their use as the official symbols of the canton was deemed unconstitutional by the Constitutional Court of the Federation, because "they only represented one constituent nation". The local government continues to use the flag and the coat of arms at plates at the official institutions.

Since 2005, the constitution lists the "languages spoken by Croats, Serbs and Bosniaks" as the official languages, without naming them, with both the Latin and the Cyrillic script having equal status.

== History ==
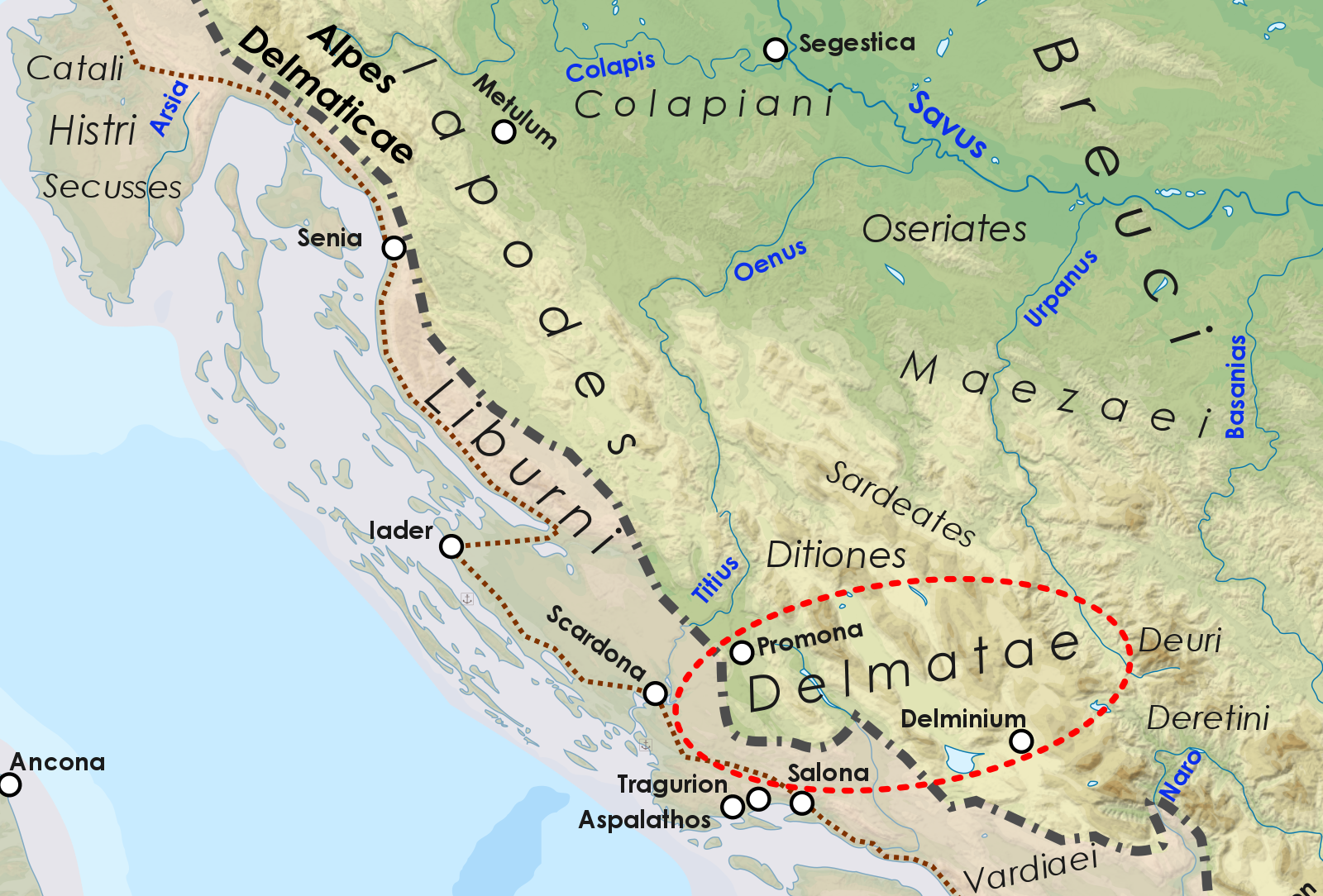
Dalmatae long resisted the Romans.

Originally occupied by the Dalmatae, the area of Canton 10 was annexed in 15 AD by the Roman Empire and formed part of the Roman province of Dalmatia. After the introduction of Christianity, Delminium (Tomislavgrad) is the seat of the bishopric.

These years also see the creation of the city of Livno. The first written appearance of the name of Livno was in 892 when it was mentioned as a seat of one of the counties of the Kingdom of Croatia. The region was attached in the ninth century to the Kingdom of the Croats and later in the 14th century to the Kingdom of Bosnia. After the death of the king of Bosnia, Tvrtko I in 1391, the power of the Kingdom of Bosnia gradually declined and the region was taken over by the Kingdom of Croatia, the state associated with the Kingdom of Hungary by a personal union.

In the 16th century, the region was fully integrated for four centuries within the Ottoman Empire. Under the Ottoman Empire, peasants who remained Catholic or Orthodox were hostile to Turkish officials and Islamised landowners.

In the nineteenth century, several uprisings and rebellions against Muslim authorities erupted in Bosnia and Herzegovina. Suffering under oppression by the authorities and furious after the Muslim authorities had killed the Catholic spiritual leader of this region, Lovro Karaula, Franciscan priest, the Catholics of Livno rose up against Ottoman rule on July 20, 1875. Soon, the Catholics from across the region joined this uprising. The rebel leaders were two Franciscan priests, Stjepan Krešić and Bonaventura Šarić-Drženjak. For three years, the insurgency controlled the mountainous regions of Glamoč, Livno, Kupres and Grahovo. When the Austrian army arrived in the Livno region in 1878, the insurgents handed over their arms to the Austrians. The Austro-Hungarian troops met in this region an opposition, both of the Muslim population and the Orthodox population, fighting battles in the vicinity of Livno. The region was liberated at the end of the summer of 1878.

Austria-Hungary occupied the region militarily after the 1878 Berlin Congress in a period marked by industrialization and Westernization. Architecturally, many public buildings were built and many Catholic religious buildings were erected that had been previously banned during the Ottoman era.

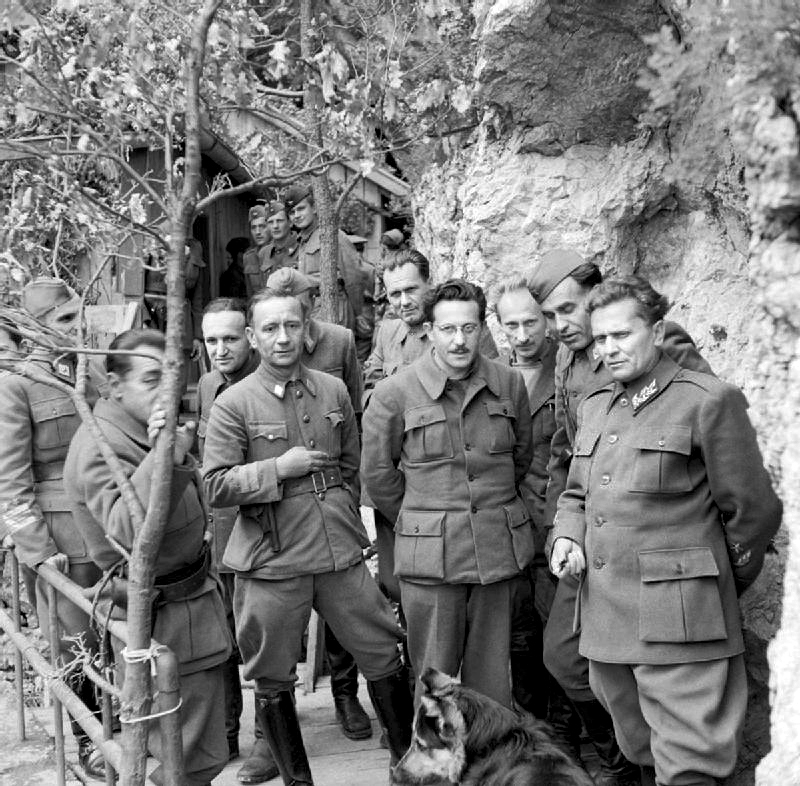
Marshal Tito during the Second World War in Drvar, May 1944

After World War I, the area of Herzeg-Bosnia county was in the Kingdom of Serbs, Croats and Slovenes, later Yugoslavia. Most of the present-day area of Herzeg-Bosnia County belonged to the then-Travnik area in 1922, while the smaller northern parts belonged to the Bišćan area. After the introduction of the January 6 dictatorship and the division of the state into banovinas in 1929, most of the Croatian areas of Herzeg-Bosnia county became part of Primorska banovina with headquarters in Split, while the northern Serbian areas were annexed to Vrbas banovina, with headquarters in Banja Luka. With the creation of Croatian Banovina in 1939, all of Primorska Banovina became part of it, including the majority of Croat areas of Canton 10.

After the creation of the NDH and its administrative division, most of the area of today's Herzeg-Bosnia County was part of the Great Parish of Pliva and Rama with its seat in Jajce, while the smaller northern part belonged to the Great Parish of Krbava and Psata with its seat in Bihać. After the defeat of the Axis powers in 1945, the area of Herzeg-Bosnia County became part of the then-federal unit of SFR Yugoslavia, Bosnia and Herzegovina. During the democratic process, most of the Croatian municipalities in the county, Kupres, Livno and Tomislavgrad, became part of the Croatian Republic of Herzeg-Bosnia.

With the independence of Bosnia and Herzegovina in the northern and western part of Herzeg-Bosnia County under the leadership of the SDS, the Serb majority areas sided with the Army of Republika Srpska killing Croats and Bosniaks in Drvar, Grahovo, Glamoč, attacking Kupres and shelling Livno and surrounding settlements. After the formation of HVO military units, first, the Kupres area was liberated. Croats and Bosniaks formed the Federation of Bosnia and Herzegovina through the Washington Agreement, which included the entire area of Herzeg-Bosnia County under HVO control, and a little later, in the summer of 1995, HVO and HV defeated Serb forces decisively. They attacked and captured Grahovo, Glamoč and Drvar, which, together with other victories of the HVO, HV and the RBiH Army, created the conditions for the signing of the Dayton Peace Agreement. After the war, Herzeg-Bosnia was self-abolished in 1996 and the Federation of Bosnia and Herzegovina was organized into counties. Herzeg-Bosnia County was the largest county in FBiH when it was created.

The Constitution of Herzeg-Bosnia Canton was adopted by the Cantonal Assembly on 19 December 1996.

== Geography ==
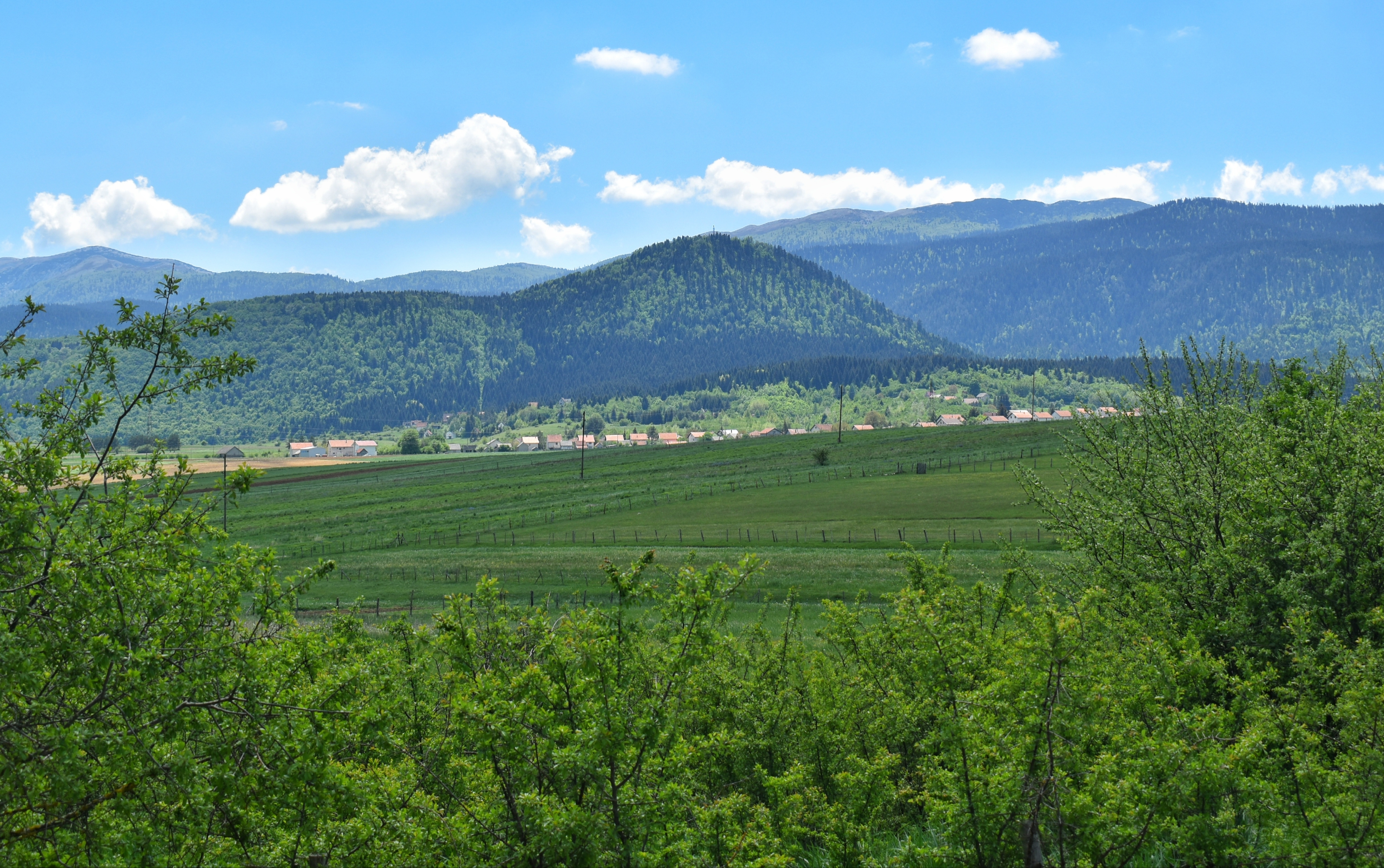
Đuličan, Canton 10

The total area of the canton is approximately 4,934 square kilometres (1,910 sq mi), a tenth of the surface of Bosnia-Herzegovina and c. 19% of the Federation. The region is located between Dalmatia to the west, Una-Sana Canton to the north, Central Bosnia Canton to the east and West Herzegovina Canton and Herzegovina-Neretva Canton to the south and southeast.

The natural and geographical features of this area are diverse, ranging from fertile and vast fields and vast pastures, rivers and lakes to centuries-old deciduous and evergreen forests, and provide abundant opportunities for life and economic development based on agricultural production, livestock and the timber industry. The ecologically clean and unspoiled nature, the mild continental climate, the geographical position and the proximity and good transport connections with neighboring Croatia, i.e. its gateway to the world, Central Dalmatia, and the connection with the whole of Herzegovina, are important factors for economic progress in this area.

=== Topography ===
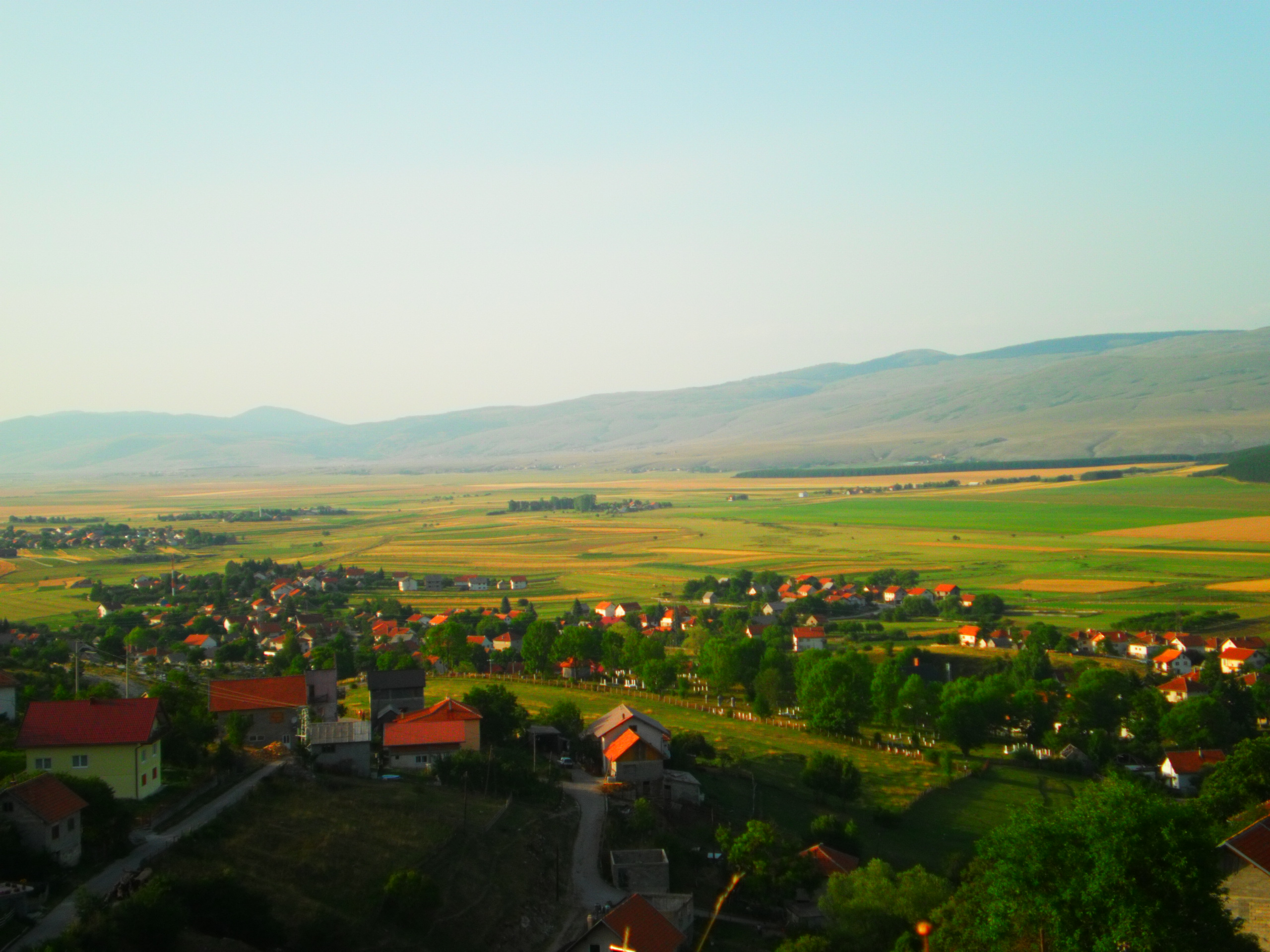
Glamoč Field

The mountainous terrain of the region is a part of the Dinaric Alps, linked from a fold and thrust belt dating from the late Jurassic period, itself part of the Alpine orogeny, extending southeast from the southern Alps. The Dinarides form part of a chain of mountains that stretch across southern Europe and isolate Pannonian Basin from the Mediterranean Sea. The highest mountain of the Tropolje Dinarides is Mount Vran, located on the border of the municipalities of Tomislavgrad and Jablanica with the peak called Veliki Vran (Great Vran) at 2,074 metres (6,804 ft).

Highest mountains of Tropolje
Mountain	Peak	Elevation	Coordinates
Vran	Veliki Vran	2,074 m (6,804 ft)	43°40′4.8″N 17°30′18″E
Vran	Mali Vis	2,014 m (6,608 ft)	43°40′41.34″N 17°29′57.08″E
Cincar	Cincar	2,006 m (6,581 ft)	43°54′08″N 17°03′46″E
Vran	Crno Brdo	1,966 m (6,450 ft)	43°40′52.96″N 17°29′37.3″E
Vran	Mali Vran	1,961 m (6,434 ft)	43°39′8.8″N 17°17′27″E
Vran	Bijela Glava	1,949 m (6,394 ft)	43°39′34″N 17°29′56″E
Vitorog	Veliki Vitorog	1,907 m (6,257 ft)	44°7′12″N 17°2′45″E
Golija	Veliki Vrh	1,886 m (6,188 ft)	43°59′12″N 16°47′21″E
Vran	Priorac	1,881 m (6,171 ft)	43°39′37″N 17°28′27″E
Šator	Veliki Šator	1,872 m (6,142 ft)	44°9′26″N 13°35′23″E

== Subdivision ==
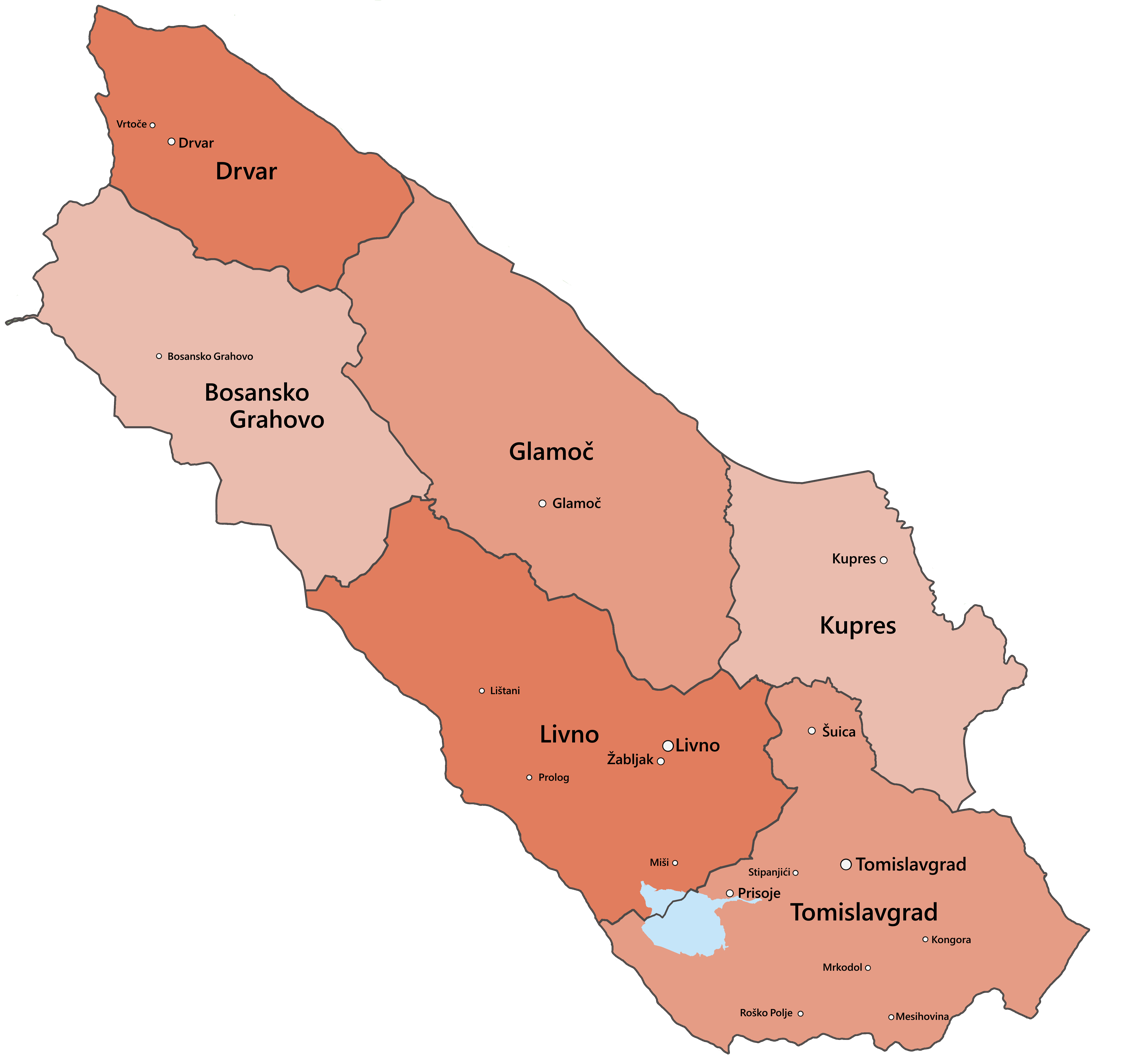
Municipalities of the Canton

Canton 10 includes five municipalities: Drvar, Bosansko Grahovo, Glamoč, Kupres, and Tomislavgrad and one township: Livno.

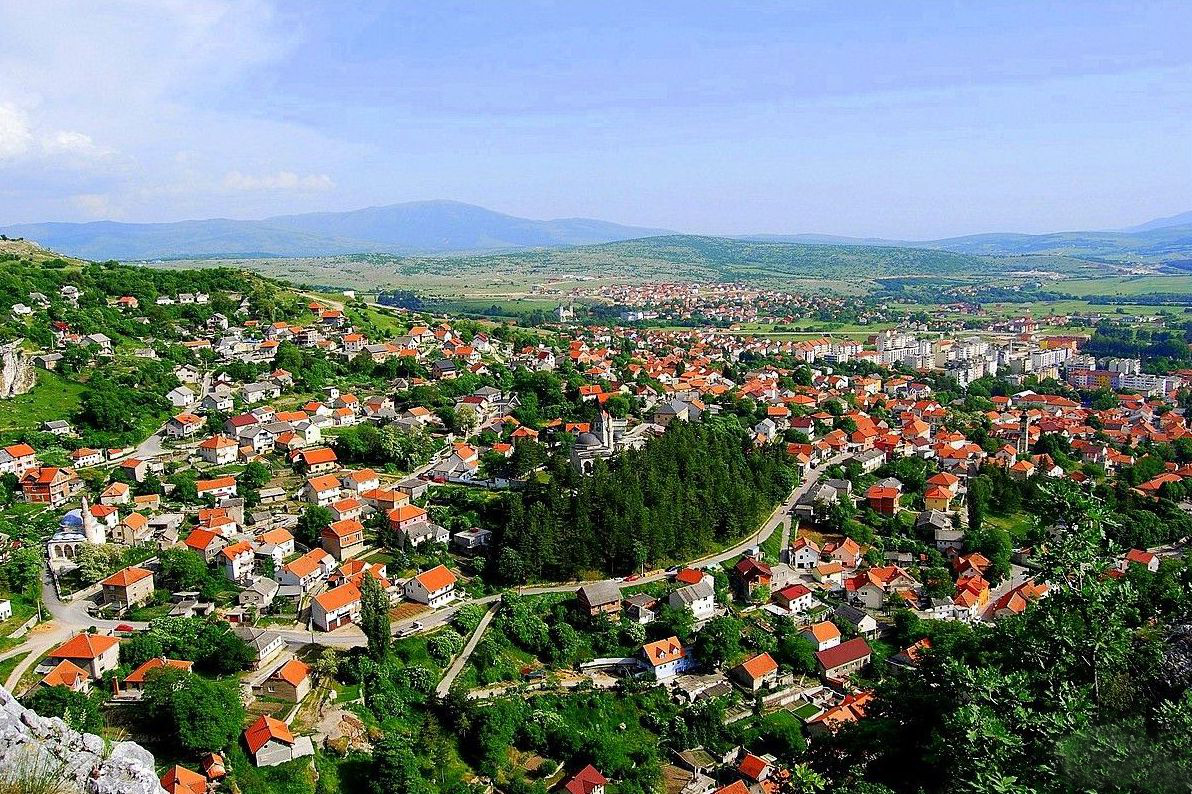
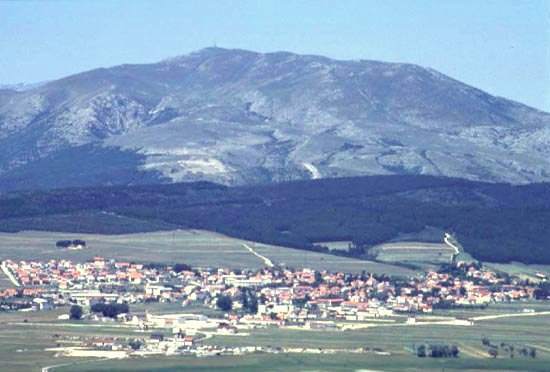
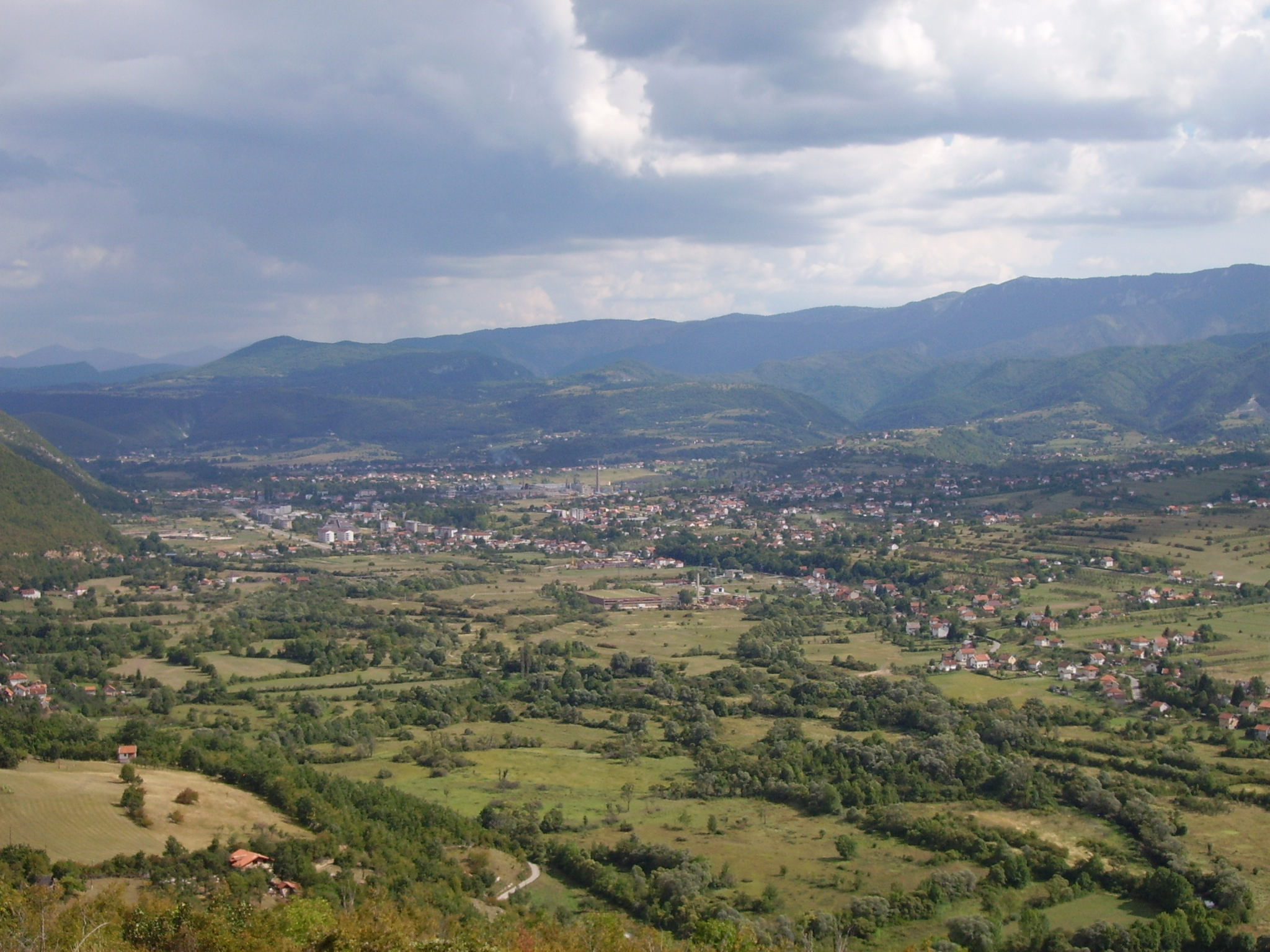
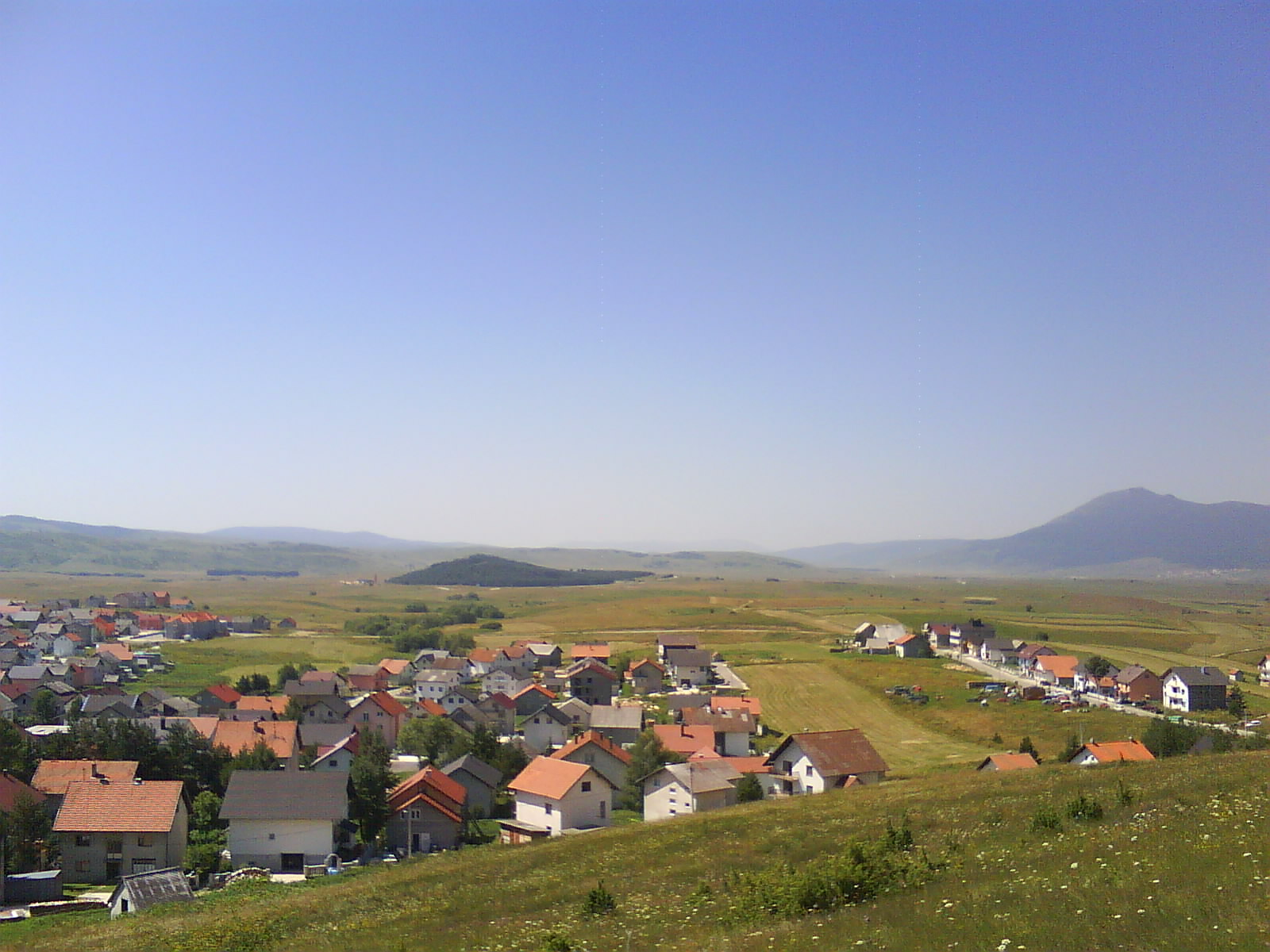
Municipalities of Canton 10
Livno Tomislavgrad	Rank	Municipalities of Canton 10	Population	Governed territory	Drvar Kupres
Livno Tomislavgrad	1	Livno	34,133	994 km^{2} (384 sq mi)	Drvar Kupres
Livno Tomislavgrad	2	Tomislavgrad	31,592	967.4 km^{2} (374 sq mi)	Drvar Kupres
Livno Tomislavgrad	3	Drvar	7,036	589.3 km^{2} (228 sq mi)	Drvar Kupres
Livno Tomislavgrad	4	Kupres	5,057	569.8 km^{2} (220 sq mi)	Drvar Kupres
Livno Tomislavgrad	5	Glamoč	3,860	1,033.6 km^{2} (399 sq mi)	Drvar Kupres
Livno Tomislavgrad	6	Bosansko Grahovo	2,449	780 km^{2} (301 sq mi)	Drvar Kupres
Livno Tomislavgrad	Source: 2013 Census				Drvar Kupres

== Governance ==
The canton is governed by the Government of Canton 10 (Croatian: Vlada Hercegbosanske županije; Serbian Cyrillic: Влада Кантона 10; Bosnian: Vlada Kantona 10). The current government is a coalition led by the Croatian National Shift.

=== Government ===
The Government of the Canton 10 is led by the prime minister who has one deputy and it consists of seven ministries. The ministries have different seats, with two ministries being seated in Tomislavgrad, and the rest in Livno.

Position	Portfolio	Seat	Officeholder	Party
Prime Minister		Livno	Ivan Vukadin	HNP
Minister	Finance	Tomislavgrad	Ivan Ćubela	HNP
Minister	Internal Affairs	Livno	Mario Lovrić	HNP
Minister	Judiciary and Administration	Livno	Aleksandar Rodić	SNSD
Minister	Economy	Livno	Miroslav Jaglica	SPS FBiH
Minister	Construction, Urban Development, and Environment	Livno	Sead Hadžijahić	SDA
Minister	Science, Education, Culture, and Sports	Livno	Ante Tadić	HNP
Minister	Labour, Healthcare, Social Care, and Refugees	Tomislavgrad	Dijana Novković Pećanac	SNSD
Minister	Agriculture, Water Management, and Forestry	Livno	Božo Perić	HDZ 1990

=== Cantonal Assembly ===
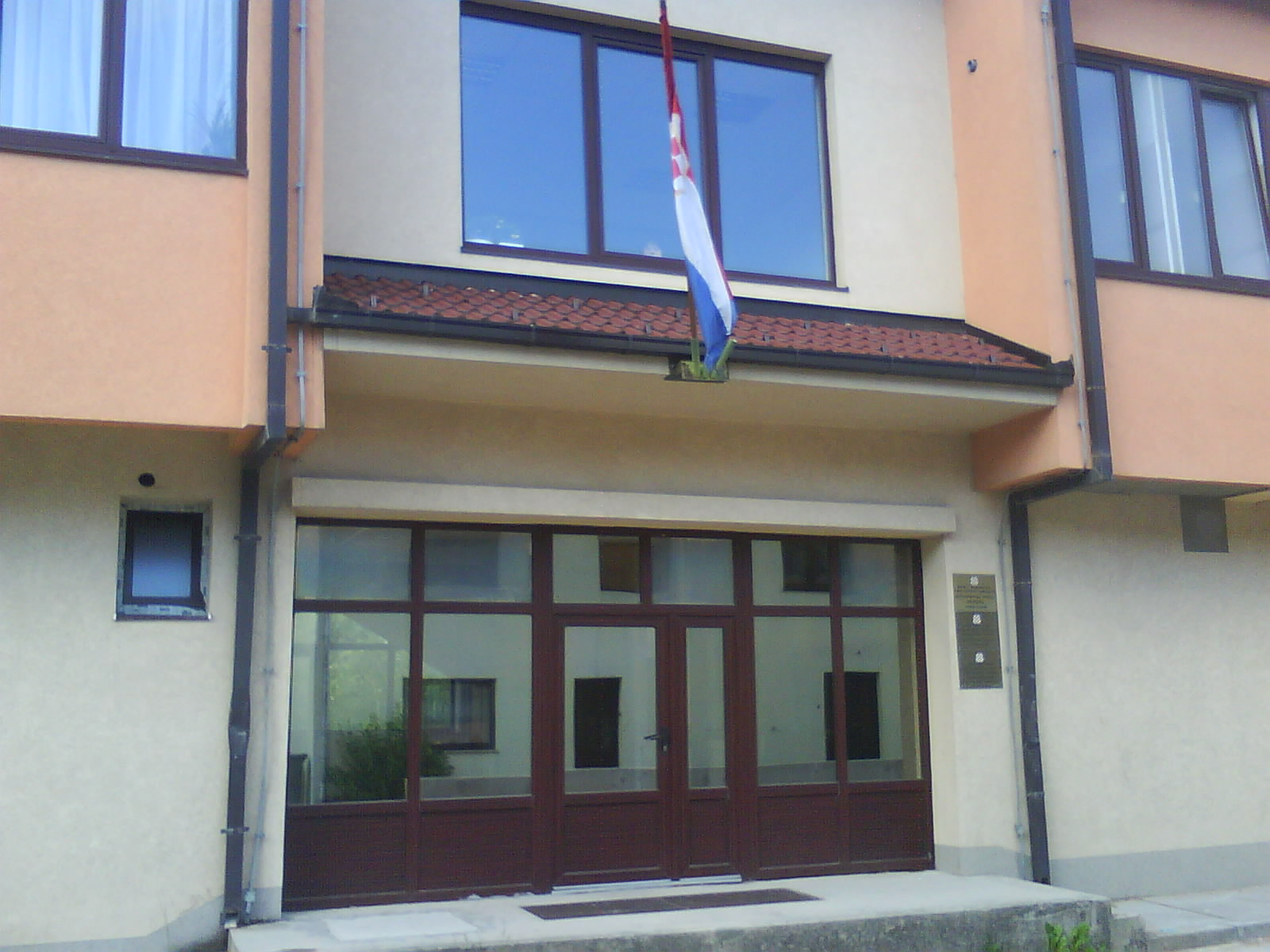
Cantonal Assembly in Tomislavgrad

The Cantonal Assembly (Croatian: Županijska skupština, Bosnian and Serbian: Kantonalna skupština/Кантонална скупштина) is the parliament of the Canton 10. It consists of 25 representatives elected by proportional representation for four-year terms of office.

Political party	Assembly members						
Political party	2002	2006	2010	2014	2018	2022	currently
Croatian National Shift (HNP)	-	-	-	-	-	5	5 / 25
Croatian Democratic Union (HDZ BiH)	13	5	9	9	8	5	4 / 25
Croatian Democratic Union (HDZ 1990)	-	6	4	4	4	4	4 / 25
Alliance of Independent Social Democrats (SNSD)	3	5	3	3	3	2	2 / 25
Croatian Independent List (HNL)	-	-	-	2	3	2	2 / 25
Party of Democratic Action (SDA)	2	2	2	2	2	2	2 / 25
Social Democratic Party (SDP BiH)	1	1	1	1	1	2	2 / 25
Serbian Progressive Party FBiH (SNS)	-	-	-	-	1	1	1 / 25
Serb National Movement	-	-	-	-	-	1	1 / 25
Croatian Republican Party (HRS)	-	-	-	-	1	1	1 / 25
Independent	-	-	-	-	-	-	1 / 25

== Demographics ==
Ethnic groups of Canton 10 (2013 census)
1. Croats (76.8%)
2. Serbs (13.0%)
3. Bosniaks (9.55%)
4. Other groups (0.70%)

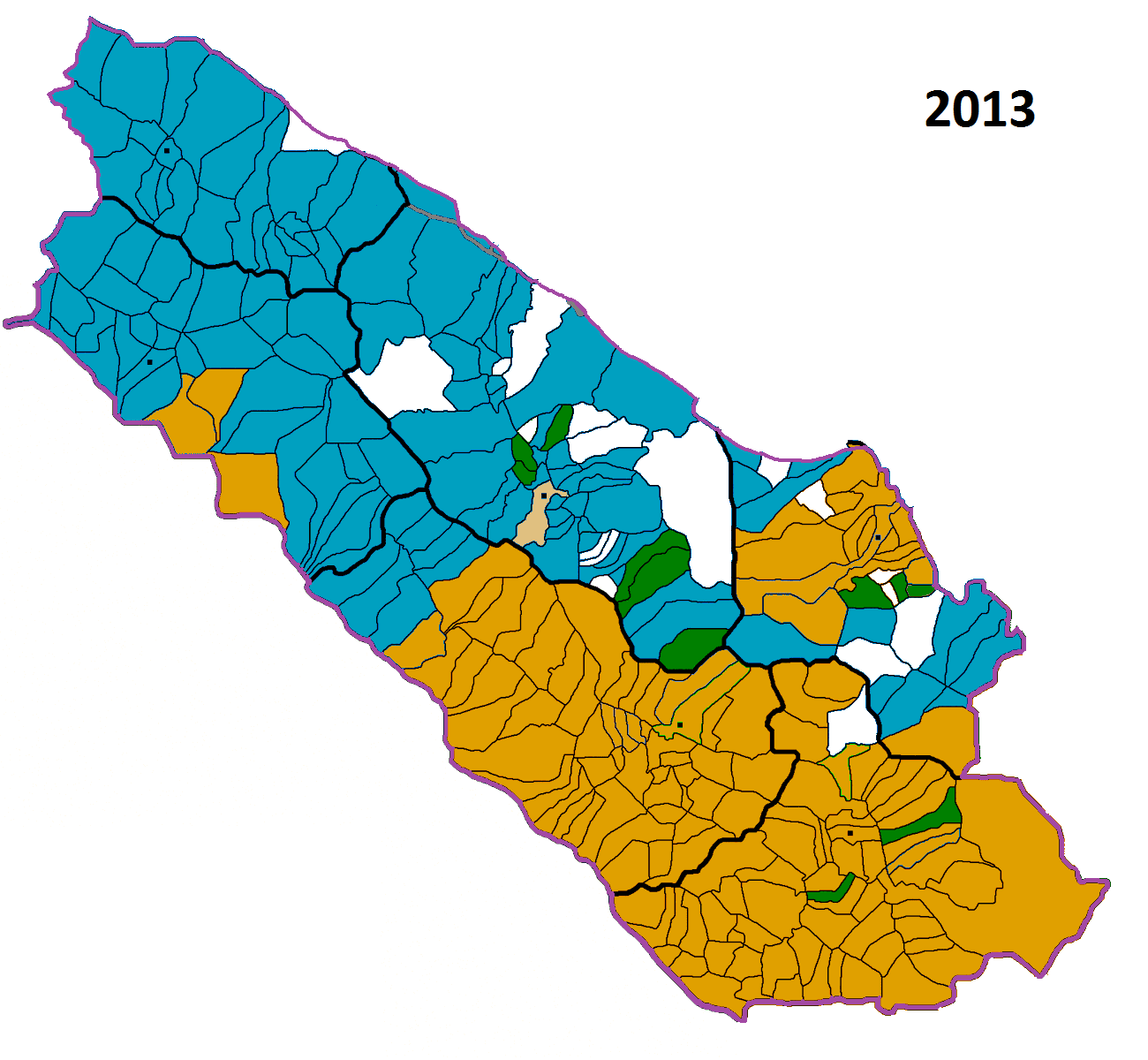
Ethnic composition of Canton 10 in 2013. Serbs in blue, Croats in orange, Bosniaks in green

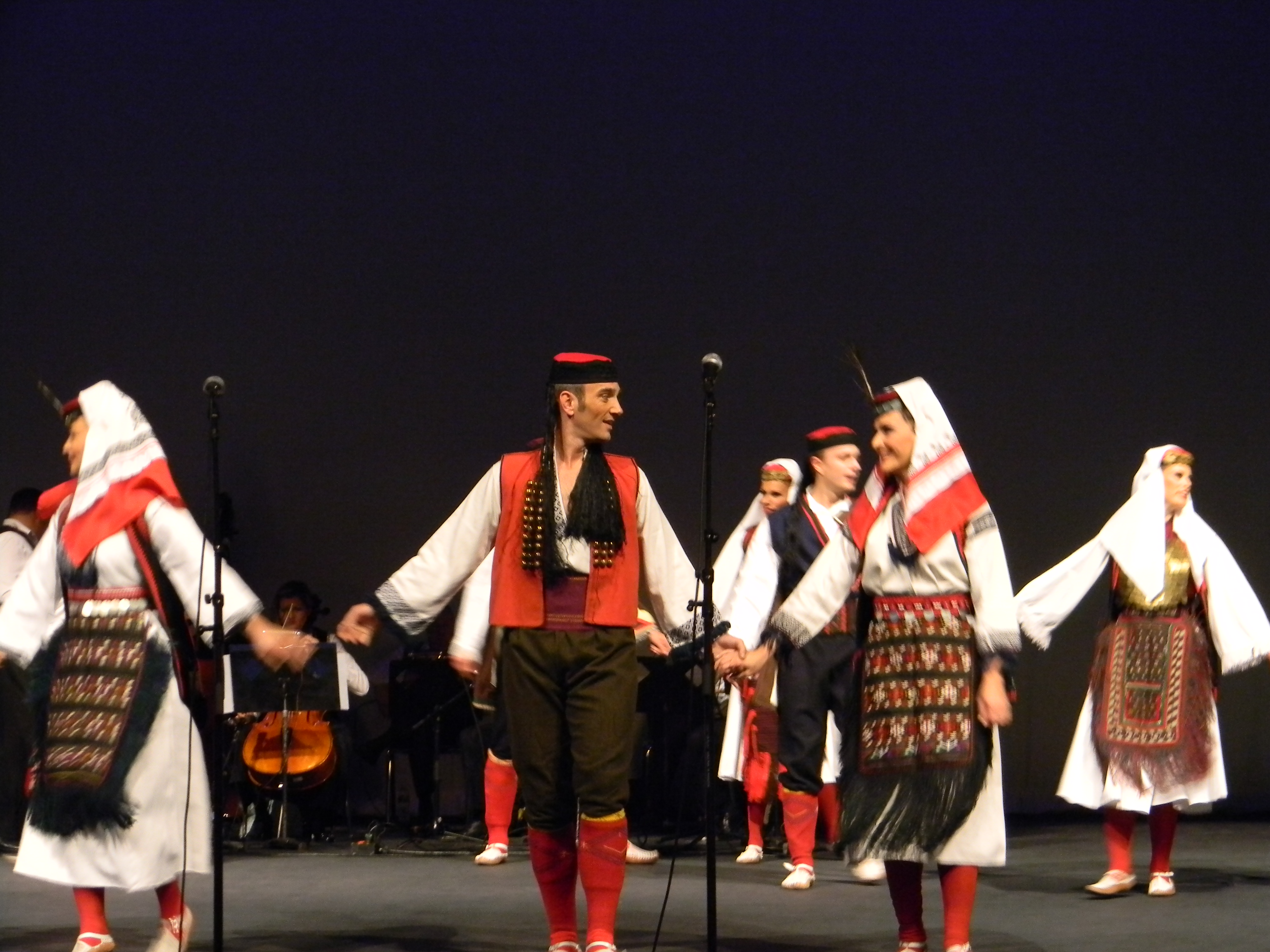
The Serbian National Folk Dance Ensemble Kolo from Glamoč

According to the 1991 census, 115.682 people inhabited the canton. Croats comprised 51.5%, Serbs comprised 35.7% and Bosnian Muslims comprised 10.4% of the population. Croats overwhelmingly lived in the southeastern part of the canton (Livno, Kupres, Tomislavgrad), while Serbs lived in northwestern (Grahovo, Glamoč, Drvar). Significant population migration occurred during the war (1992–95). In 1992, Serb forces captured Kupres and the surrounding area, pushing away most of the non-Serb population. Croats returned at the end of 1994, after their forces retook Kupres. After Croat forces captured Grahovo, Glamoč and Drvar in the summer and fall of 1995, 12,000 to 14,000 Serbs fled to Banja Luka. Refugee Croats from other parts of Bosnia and Herzegovina (fleeing Serb or Bosniak forces) settled in the abandoned area previously inhabited by the Serbs. After the war, under UN and peace implementation forces' pressure, Serb refugees returned to their homes.

In 2013, the Canton's population included approximately 77% Croats, 13% Serbs and 9.6% Bosniaks; all other ethnicities combined made up the remaining <0.4%. Canton 10 had the largest share of ethnic Serbs in the Federation of Bosnia and Herzegovina. However, their number has steadily decreased since the conclusion of the Bosnian War.

=== 1991 Census ===
Municipality	Nationality								Total
Municipality	Croats	%	Serbs	%	Muslims	%	Other	%	Total
Livno	29,324	72.22	3,913	9.63	5,793	14.26	1,570	3.87	40,600
Tomislavgrad	25,976	86.56	576	1.91	3,148	10.49	309	1.02	30,009
Glamoč	184	1.46	9,951	79.02	2,257	17.92	201	1.58	12,593
Kupres	3,812	43.19	4,081	46.23	802	9.08	131	1.47	8,826
Bosansko Grahovo	226	2.71	7,888	94.91	12	0.14	185	2.22	8,311
Drvar	31	0.20	14,846	96.76	29	0.18	437	2.86	15,343
Canton	59,553	51.48	41,255	35.66	12,041	10.41	2,833	2.45	115,682

=== 2013 Census ===
Municipality	Nationality								Total
Municipality	Croats	%	Serbs	%	Bosniaks	%	Other	%	Total
Livno	29,273	85.76	438	1.28	4,047	11.85	216	0.63	34,133
Tomislavgrad	29,006	91.81	22	0.06	2,467	7.80	30	0.09	31,592
Glamoč	906	23.47	1,679	43.49	1,251	32.40	13	0.33	3,860
Kupres	4,474	88.47	318	6.28	255	5.04	5	0.09	5,057
Bosansko Grahovo	393	16.04	2,028	82.80	6	0.24	10	0.40	2,449
Drvar	552	7.85	6,420	91.24	11	0.15	24	0.34	7,036
Canton	64,604	76.79	10,905	12.96	8,037	9.55	581	0.69	84,127

== Economy ==
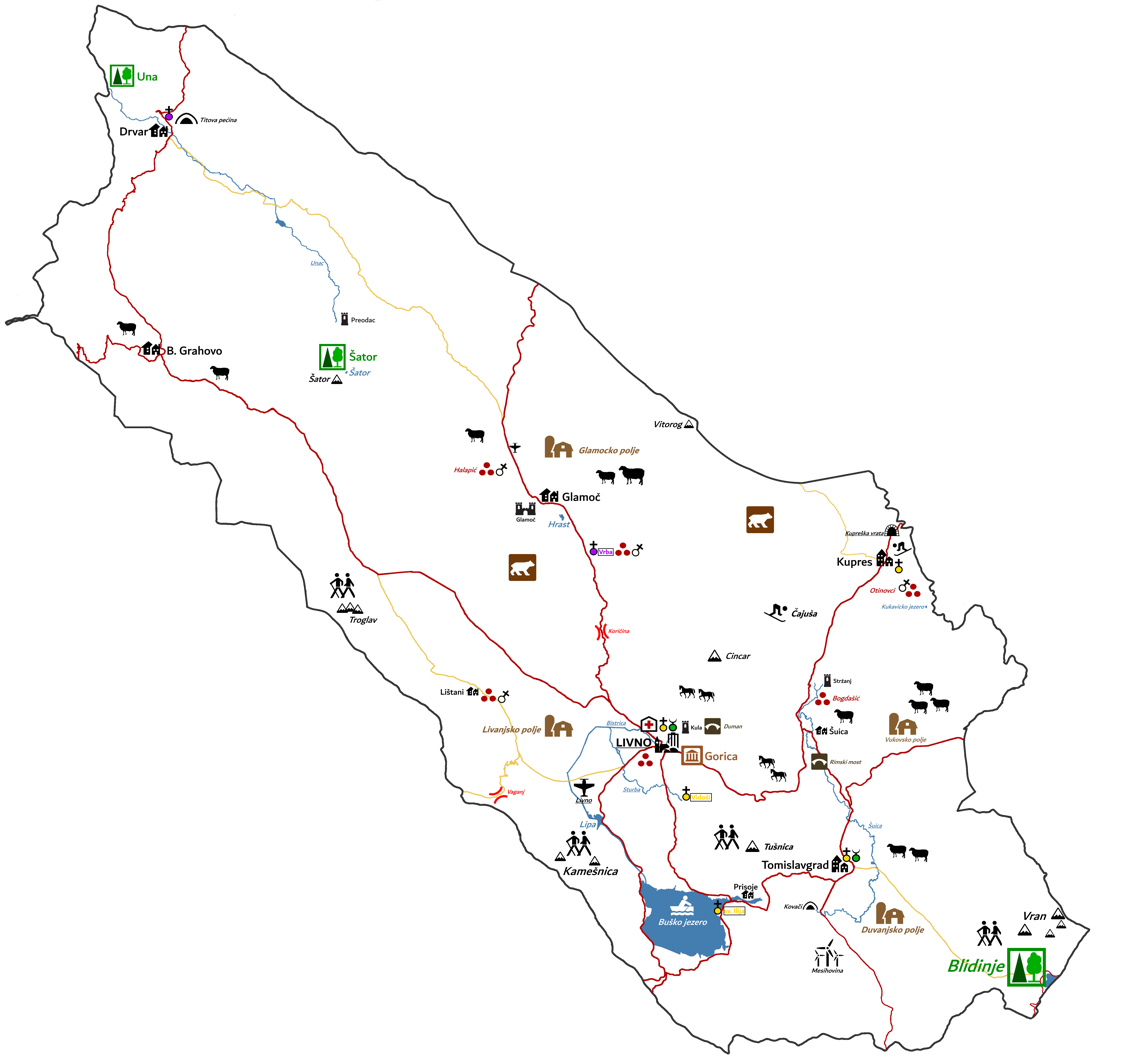
Tourist map of Canton 10

The pre-war economic recession, and certainly the war in this area, caused significant population fluctuations in the form of emigration to Western European countries or relocation to other areas of Bosnia and Herzegovina.

The natural and geographical features of this area are diverse, from fertile and vast fields and vast pastures, rivers and lakes to centuries-old deciduous and evergreen forests, and provide abundant opportunities for life and economic development based on agricultural production, livestock and the timber industry. The ecologically clean and intact nature, the temperate continental climate, the geographical position and the proximity and good transport connections with other parts of Bosnia and Herzegovina and neighbouring Croatia, especially Dalmatia, which traditionally and economically gravitate, are important factors for the economic development of this area. The canton suffered severe damage during the last war and is one of the worst-affected areas in the Federation of Bosnia and Herzegovina. The rebuilding process is slow and difficult, but the economy is already showing signs of recovery, most notably in construction, the wood processing industry, small businesses, and the handicrafts segment. Although commerce is still the dominant branch of the economy, in terms of the total number of companies (191, or 44.50% of the 429 active companies and 30% of total income).

From the revenue perspective of 1998 and 1999, there was a significant increase in construction, agriculture and forestry, as well as transportation, industry, and mining. Commerce registered a decrease in income compared to 1998 by 2 index points, as well as a decrease in the participation in total income at the cantonal level from 44.80% in 1998 to 30% in 1999 in favor of other productive activities, and especially construction agriculture and forestry, especially if we take into account that the total income generated at the cantonal level in 1999 increased by 25% compared to 1998. All these are positive indicators of economic recovery and the basis of the expected future development.

The main economic branches of Canton 10, by number of employees, are wholesale and retail trade, processing industry, and agriculture, forestry, and fishing.

The average salary in Canton 10 is 1168 KM (2024). The highest average net salary is paid in Livno (1269 KM) and the lowest in Drvar (928 KM).

== See also ==
- List of heads of the Canton 10
- Tropolje

== Sources ==
- Central Intelligence Agency, Office of Russian and European Analysis (2002). Balkan Battlegrounds: A Military History of the Yugoslav Conflict, 1990–1995. Washington, D.C.: Central Intelligence Agency. ISBN 9780160664724. OCLC 50396958.
- "Report of the Secretary-General submitted pursuant to Security Council Resolution 981 (1995)" (PDF). United Nations Security Council. 3 August 1995.
