= Božić =

Božić is a common surname in Bosnia and Herzegovina, Croatia, Montenegro, and Serbia. The spelling Božič is found in Slovenia.

Božić is a common surname in Croatia, with 8,115 bearers (2011 census). It is the third most common surname in Vukovar-Srijem County, and among the most common in three other counties. Among the earliest known mentions is the one found in the 1749 Tax census. It is frequent among Croats of Bosnia and Herzegovina from Cazin krajina, Unešić, Livno and Tomislavgrad.

In Slovenia, there are more than 3,500 people with the surname Božič, and more than 500 with the surname Božić (most of them are of Croatian or Serbian origin, since the letter "ć" doesn't exist in the Slovenian alphabet). It is the 13th most common surname in Slovenia. However, there are important regional differences: while it is the 2nd most common surname in the Lower Sava Statistical Region, and the 4th most common surname in the Coastal–Karst Statistical Region, it is extremely rare in eastern Slovenia. Around 54% of Slovenians with this surname live in Carniola, around 28% in the Slovenian Littoral, and around 13% in Slovenian Styria.

Božić is also the Croatian, Serbian, Slovenian and Bosnian translation of the word "Christmas".

== People ==
=== General ===
- Andrea Bosic (born Ignazio Andrej Božič, 1919–2012), Italian actor of Slovene descent
- B. Wongar (born 1932 as Sreten Božić), Serbian-Australian writer
- Bonaventura Božić (c. 1693– 1761), Croatian military writer and translator
- Božić Božićević (c. 1554 – c. 1616), Croatian poet and nobleman from Split
- Čedomir Božić (1984–2024), Serbian politician
- Danica Božić-Bužančić (1922–2022), Croatian historian and archivist
- Dobrivoje Božić (1885–1967), Serbian inventor
- Elena Božić Talijan (born 1970), Serbian journalist and politician
- Ivan Božić (1915–1977), Yugoslav historian
- Marinko Božić, founder of Slobodni tjednik
- Marjanca Jemec Božič (born 1928), Slovene illustrator
- Mate Božić (born 1981), Croatian historian, writer and author
- Mihovil Božić (c. 1721–1795), Croatian glagolitic priest and teacher
- Milan Božić (born 1952), Serbian politician
- Mirko Božić (1919–1995), Croatian writer, novelist and playwright
- Nenad Božić (born 1971), Serbian politician
- Peter Božič (1932–2009), Slovenian writer, playwright, journalist and politician
- Radič Božić (fl. 1502, died 1528), Serbian noble and titular despot of Serbia
- Sandra Božić (born 1979), Serbian politician
- Željko Božić (1974–2006), Serbian stuntman and actor

=== Fictional ===
- Richard Bozic, a fictional character on the Australian TV series Home and Away
- Mate Božić, a fictional character on the Croatian TV series Kud puklo da puklo, not based on the real-life Croatian historian Mate Božić

=== Sports ===
- Ana Božić (born 1988), Croatian basketball player
- Borut Božič (born 1980), Slovenian road racing cyclist
- Brina Božič (born 1992), Slovenian archer
- Dennis Bozic (born 1990), Swedish ice hockey player
- Dragan Božić (Serbian politician, born 1959), Serbian politician
- Dragan Božić (Serbian politician, born 1969), Serbian politician
- Iztok Božič (born 1971), Slovenian tennis player
- Josip Božić Pavletić (born 1994), Croatian handball player
- Luka Božič (born 1991), Slovenian slalom canoeist
- Luka Božić (born 1996), Croatian basketball player
- Mojca Božič (born 1992), Slovenian volleyball player
- Paško Božić (born 2002), Croatian taekwondo practitioner
- Petar Božić (born 1978), Serbian basketball player and coach
- Robert Bozic (born 1950), Canadian boxer, son of Dobrivoje
- Srdjan Božić (born 1984), Serbian basketball player
- Stipe Božić (born 1951), Croatian mountain climber
- Stjepan Božić (born 1974), Croatian boxer

==== Footballers ====
- Blaž Božič (born 1990), Slovene footballer
- Filip Božić (born 1999), Bosnian-Herzegovinian footballer
- Helena Božić (born 1997), Montenegrin footballer
- Igor Božić (born 1987), Serbian footballer
- Ivan Božić (born 1983), Bosnian-Croat footballer
- Ivan Božić (born 1997), Croatian footballer
- Mario Božić (born 1983), Bosnia and Herzegovina footballer
- Marko Božič (Slovenian footballer) (born 1984), Slovenian footballer
- Marko Božić (born 1998), Austrian footballer
- Milan Božić (footballer) (born 1982), Canadian soccer player
- Mile Božić (born 1981), Croatian footballer
- Radivoj Božić (1912–1948), Serbian and Yugoslav footballer
- Tomislav Božić (born 1987), Croatian footballer

== See also ==
- Božović
- Božić family
