= Lipsko Lake =

- Location in Western Bosnia
- Interactive map of Lipsko Lake
- Location: Livanjsko Polje near Lipa (Livno)
- Coordinates: 43.752800°N 16.917354°E
- Type: Compensation basin for HPP "Orlovac"
- Catchment area: Livanjsko Polje/Bistrica (Livanjsko Polje)/Cetina
- Basin countries: Bosnia and Herzegovina, Croatia
- Surface area: 1 km^{2} (0.39 sq mi)
- Water volume: 1 million cubic metres (810 acre⋅ft)
- Surface elevation: 716 m (2,349 ft)
- Settlements: Livno

Lipsko Lake is an artificial lake of Bosnia and Herzegovina. It is located in the municipality of Livno.

== Hydropower and irrigation system ==
At 20,3 kilometers the Bistrica finally reaches Lipsko Lake, near village of Lipa, which is first and smaller of two artificial reservoirs in hydroelectric power plant system Buško Blato - HPP "Orlovac", other being Buško Blato reservoir. In this system Lipsko Lake is a compensation basin and serves for regulation of an outflow of water toward intake facility at penstock station "Lipa" at the foot of Kamešnica mountain, and across the border into Croatia where hydroelectric power plant "HE Orlovac" is situated. Lipsko Lake is connected with much larger reservoir of Buško Blato, whose head can rise above head of Lipsko Lake up to several meters, via the reversible canal of "Lipsko-Buško" where it stores an excess waters from Livanjsko Polje and the Bistrica, especially during flooding season and high precipitation periods. For transfer of these waters over the barrage "Podgradina", at village Podgradina, into Buško Blato reservoir, system uses reversible pumping station "Buško Blato", built at the point where canal reaches barrage.

== See also ==
- List of lakes in Bosnia and Herzegovina
