= Mate Božić =

Croatian historian

- Born: February 28, 1981 (age 45); Split
- Education: I Gymnasium Split; University of Split
- Occupations: Historian; Writer
- Years active: 2005-present
- Spouse: Iva Božić

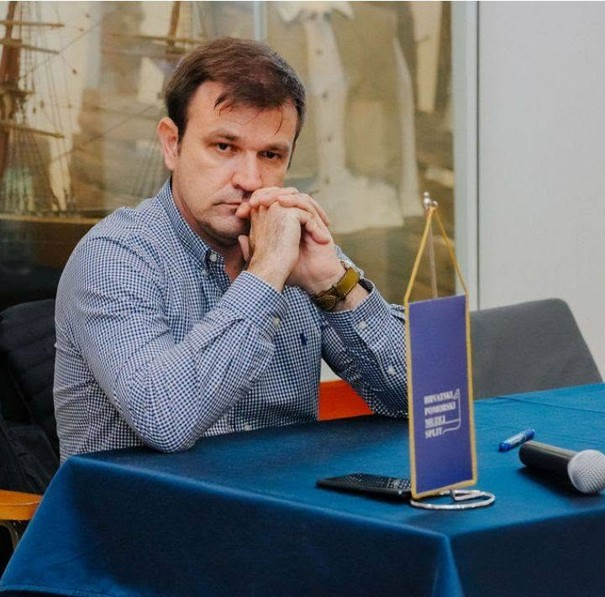
Mate Božić in 2026

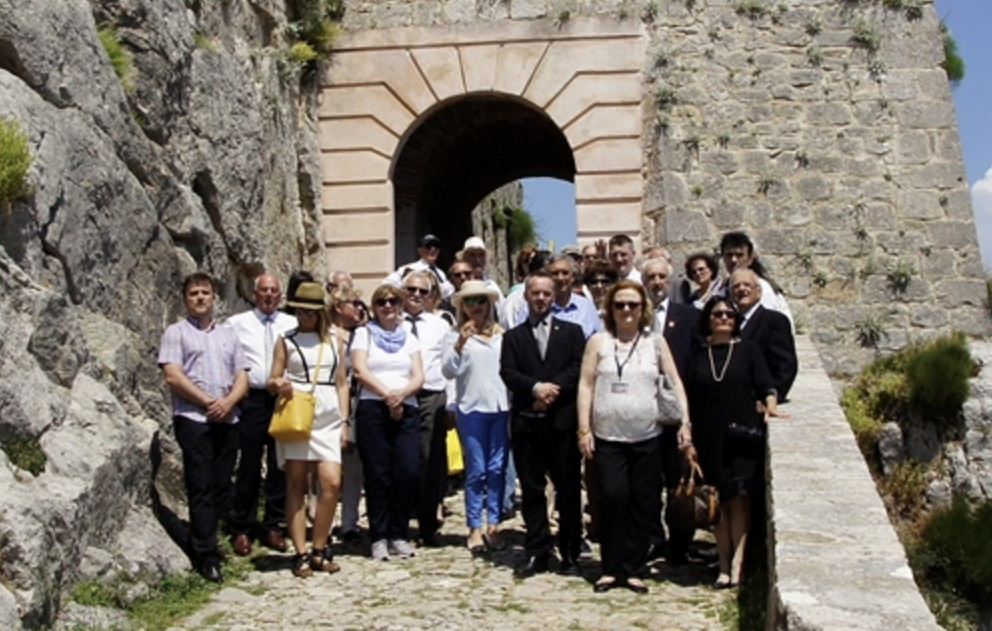
Mate Božić, as the representative of the Croatian Heraldic and Vexillological Association, and other attendees of the Great Nobiliary Council of the Croatian Nobility Association, held in Klis, May 26th 2018. (from left to right): Tina Borelli Tkalčec, Gaja Pozojević, Nikša Kuščić, Umberto Marušić, Dorotea Murković Puškarić, Matija Borelli

Mate Božić (born February 28, 1981.) is a Croatian historian, writer and author.

== Biography ==
Mate Božić was born in Split where he attended Classical Gymnasium before graduating from the University of Split's Faculty of Humanities with a degree in history and philosophy. During his studies he was one of the founders of the student historical society "Toma Arhiđakon" (as a part of the Department of History at the Faculty of Humanities and Social Sciences of Split University) and is engaged as its current liquidator, student history journal "Pleter" and theological-philosophical journal "Odraz" (2005). He is member of the Croatian Heraldic and Vexillological Association, Croatian Philosophical Society, collaborator of the Croatian Heritage Foundation (CHF) – Split branch, as well as the coordinator of "Regnum Croatorum" (archeological tourism) project, "Škola heraldike" (Klis) and "Mala škola filozofije" (Solin).

Being a reputable expert on Croatian heraldry Božić's principal scientific focus is the study of Croatian heraldic theory and practice, as well as historical-philosophical subjects of the Croatian early Middle Ages. Serving as a secretary (2026) and a herald of the Historical unit Kliški uskoci ("Uskoks of Klis") he additionally contributed to the foundation of the historical early medieval reenactment group "Praetoriani Croatorum". He shares and popularizes his findings through "GottschTalk" blog postings and as a columnist through a series of essays published by Split, Kaštela and Solin web portals, where he lives and works.

=== Symbolism of the Croatian Coat of Arms ===
One of historian Božić's most significant scientific contributions lies in his research on the Croatian coat of arms. He contends that the emblem symbolizes a fortress rather than simply a checkboard pattern, framing it as a representation of Croatia as a "bulwark of Christianity" in the context of historical conflicts with the Ottoman Empire. His presentation and writings emphasize that this coat of arms has deep-rooted significance that aligns with the country's historical struggles and identity.

Božić's theories gained acknowledgment through the recent declaration by the Croatian Academy of Sciences and Arts (HAZU), which recognized the legitimacy of various forms of the Croatian coat of arms, irrespective of color variations. His participation in discussions surrounding this declaration underscores his role in shaping contemporary understandings of Croatian heraldry and identity.

=== School of heraldry - Klis ===
Anniversary logo of School of heraldry - Klis (2016.-2026.)

School of heraldry - Klis (Croatian: Škola heraldike - Klis) is an educational program which is held in the historic Klis citadel in the municipality of the same name, northeast of Solin and Split. It was established through the joint efforts of the Toma Arhiđakon History Students' Association (based at the Faculty of Humanities and Social Sciences, University of Split) and the Klis Uskoks Historical Unit. The School of heraldry has been held intermittently for a decade, since early October 2016. It aims to revitalize heraldic practice and theory within local and broader social contexts following decades of neglect and largely unfavorable historical circumstances during the 20th century. It's long-standing coordinator is Mate Božić, serving as a herald of the Historical unit Kliški uskoci.

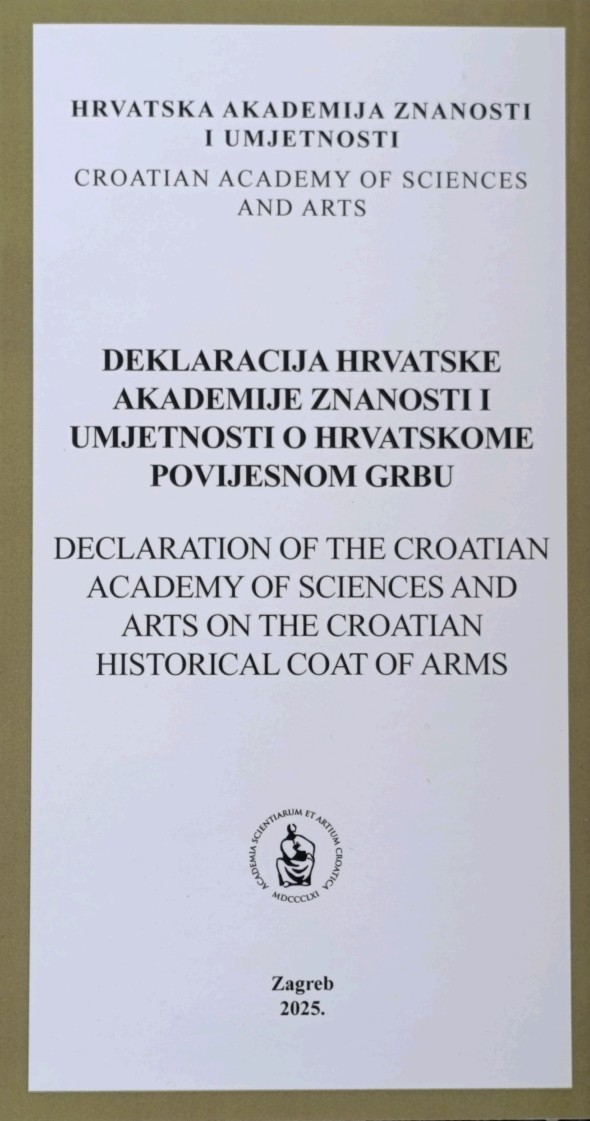
Declaration of the Croatian Academy which recognized the legitimacy of various forms of the Croatian coat of arms, irrespective of color variations (Zagreb, June 5, 2025)

== Selected publications ==
- – (2014) Božić, Mate. "Udruga studenata povijesti 'Toma Arhiđakon'" // Spalatumque dedit ortum: zbornik povodom desete godišnjice Odsjeka za povijest Filozofskog fakulteta u Splitu = Collected papers on the occasion of the 10th anniversary of the Department of History, Faculty of Humanities and Social Sciences in Split / I. Basić, M. Rimac (ur.) Split: Odsjek za povijest Filozofskog fakulteta Sveučilišta u Splitu 2014; str.77–85 https://www.croris.hr/crosbi/publikacija/prilog-knjiga/68896
- – (2017) Božić, Mate. "Bitka kod Siska 1593. godine" // Pleter, 1 (2017) 1; str. 177–192 https://www.croris.hr/crosbi/publikacija/prilog-casopis/291543
- – (2017) Božić, Mate; Ćosić, Stjepan. "Nastanak hrvatskih grbova: Podrijetlo, povijest i simbolika od 13. do 16. stoljeća" // Gordogan, 35–36 (2017.); 22 – 68 https://www.croris.hr/crosbi/publikacija/prilog-casopis/291537
- – (2019) Božić, Mate. "'HRVAT' I 'HRVATI' – OD TOPONIMA DO ETNONIMA" // Pleter, 3 (2019) 3; str. 135–176 https://www.croris.hr/crosbi/publikacija/prilog-casopis/291541
- – (2021) Božić, Mate; Ćosić, Stjepan. HRVATSKI GRBOVI geneza – simbolika – povijest. Zagreb, Hrvatska sveučilišna naklada, Filozofski fakultet sveučilišta u Zagrebu, Institut društvenih znanosti; 2021.
- – (2022) Božić, Mate; Ćosić, Stjepan. "Sveti Jeronim u heraldičkoj simbolici" // Kroatologija, 13 (2022) 3; str. 11–27 https://www.croris.hr/crosbi/publikacija/prilog-casopis/325037
- – (2025) Božić, Mate; "Kratki pregled povijesti domobranstva u hrvatskim krajevima" // Trideset godina Hrvatskoga domobrana Omiš i sto pedeset pet godina hrvatskoga domobranstva / D. Zeljko Selak (ur.) Omiš - Dugi Rat: Ogranak Matice hrvatske u Imotskome, Hrvatski domobran - Udruga ratnih veterana Omiš, 2025; str. 51-53.

== See also ==
- Mate Božić (born 2 February 2005), a Croatian footballer from Zadar
