= Žabljak (river) =

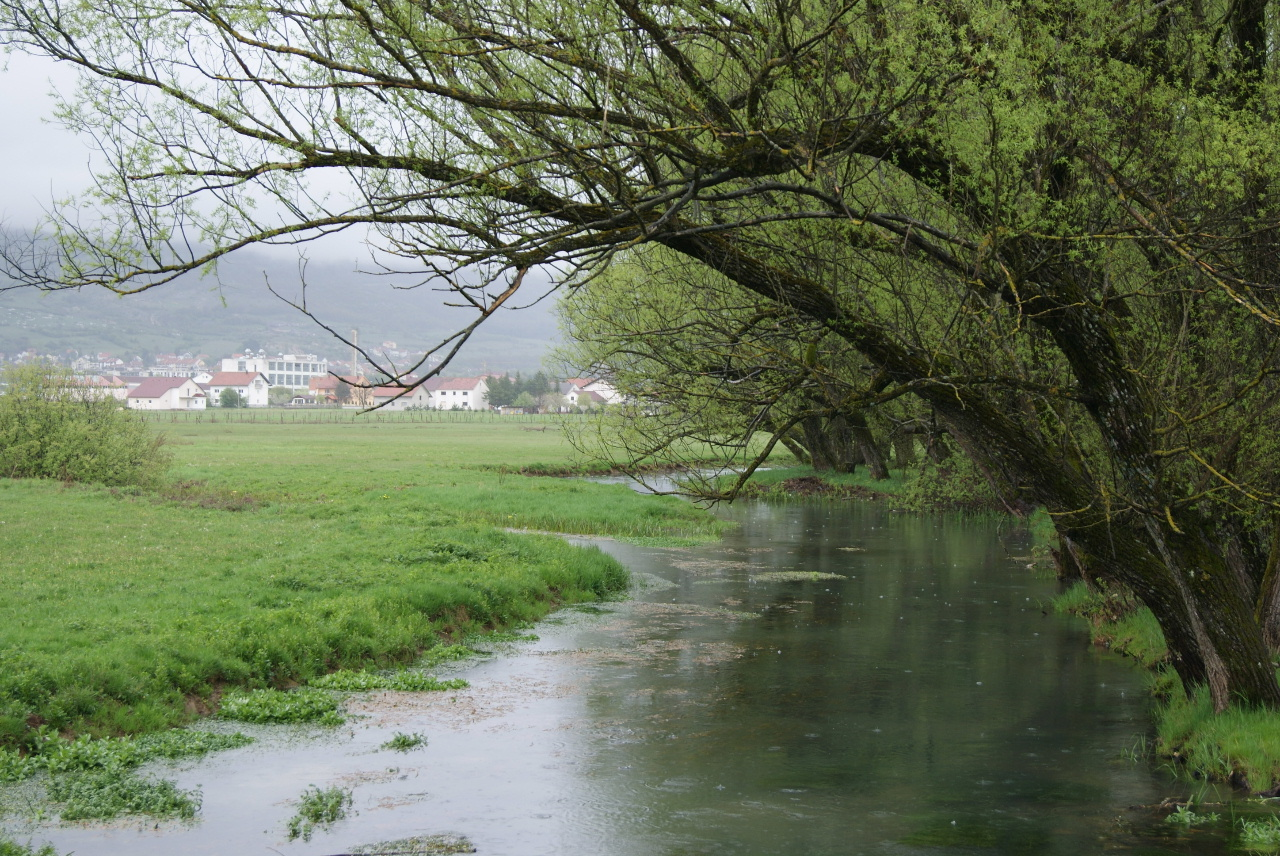
- Žabljak in suburb of Livno

- Location within Bosnia and Herzegovina

Location
- Country: Bosnia and Herzegovina
- Municipality: Livno

Physical characteristics
- Source
  - location: Gornji Žabljak village, suburb of Livno
  - coordinates: 43.832545°N 17.008634°E
- Mouth: Bistrica
  - location: Livanjsko Polje
  - coordinates: 43.838829°N 16.956816°E
- Length: 38 km (24 mi) - 66 km (41 mi)

Basin features
- River system: Buško Blato, Cetina
- Landmarks: Livanjsko Polje
- Waterbodies: Lipsko lake, Buško Blato

Žabljak is a river near Livno in Western Bosnia, Bosnia and Herzegovina. It flows for roughly 6.6 kilometers westward through Livanjsko Polje before its confluence with the Bistrica, just upstream from beginning of its section with artificially created riverbed, from where river begins to turn southward toward Buško Blato.

This stretch of the Žabljak, like all rivers in the southeastern half of Livanjsko Polje, is regulated. For 3.8 kilometers from its wellspring to the bridge on highway Livno-Split (M107/M16), where remains of an old bridge called "Rimski Most" (literally English: Roman Bridge) can also be found, the Žabljak runs unregulated, and from the bridge to its confluence with Bistrica, 2.8 kilometers, the riverbed is regulated.

Before the regulation, required for development of hydroelectric and irrigational system Buško Blato, the river joined Bistrica and Sturba to make the Plovuča river, which than continued flowing westward through polje until disappearing within main estavelle called "Veliki Ponor"* (43.82980°N 16.813658°E) at the foot of Dinara mountain.

== Note ==
- *English: "Grand Ponor" (ponor = sinkhole, estavelle; like polje, ponor too is borrowed word from Serbo-Croatian languages, mostly through western research of Dinaric Karst since early days of modern geology and hydrogeology).
