= Livanjsko Polje =

Large flat plain in Bosnia and Herzegovina

- Polje
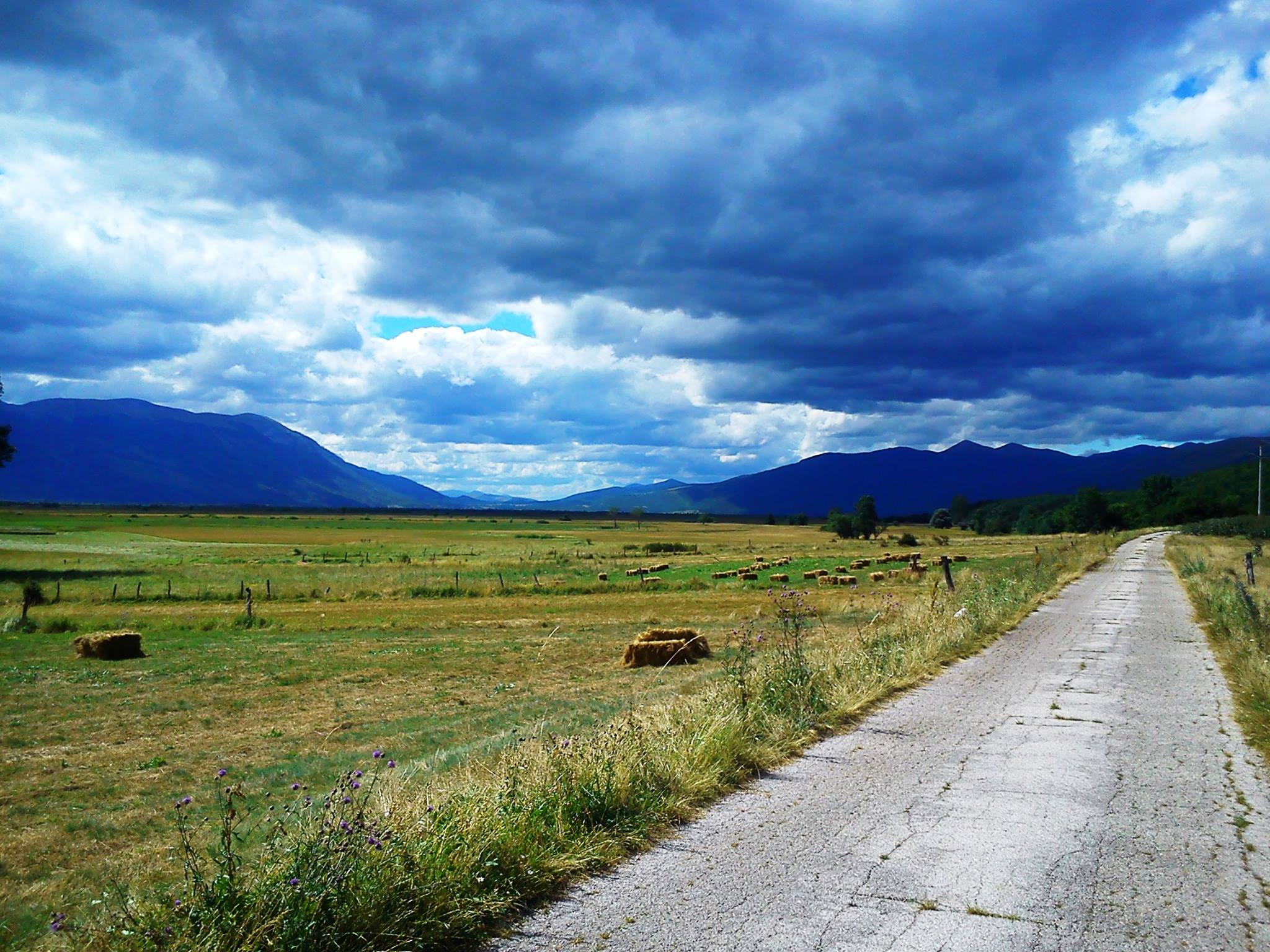
- Livanjsko field, largest Dinaric Alps karstic plateau in Bosnia and Herzegovina

- Interactive map of Livanjsko Polje
- Coordinates: 43°49′54.69″N 17°0′32.26″E
- Location: Canton 10, Bosnia and Herzegovina
- Range: Dinaric Alps
- Part of: Tropolje

Area
  - Total: 458.7 square kilometres (113,300 acres)

Dimensions
  - Length: 30km NW-SE
  - Width: 6km NE-SW
- Surface elevation: 720 m (2,360 ft)
- Designation

Ramsar Wetland
- Official name: Livanjsko Polje
- Designated: 11 April 2008
- Reference no.: 1786
- Rivers: Bistrica, Brina, Sturba, Ričina, Plovuča, Jaruga
- Borders on: Dinara, Kamešnica, Tušnica, Cincar, Golija, Šator, Staretina, Buško Blato
- Town: Livno

Livanjsko polje (lit. 'Field of Livno'), located in Bosnia and Herzegovina, is the largest polje (karstic field) in the world and a RAMSAR wetland site. A typical example of karst polje encircled by tall peaks and mountain ranges, the field is characterized by many unique natural phenomenons and karstic features.

== Geography ==
With an area of 458.7 km^{2} (113,300 acres), an average length of 30 km (19 mi) and an average width of 6 km (3.7 mi), Livanjsko Polje is the largest depression of its kind in the world. It is located at an average height of 720 m (2,360 ft) above sea level.

The field is located in region of Tropolje, in the southwest of Bosnia and Herzegovina, and lies between the karstic mountains of Dinara and Kamešnica on the south, Tušnica mountain on the east, Cincar and Golija mountain on the north and Šator and Staretina mountain on the west. Buško Blato (also called Buško Lake) lies to the southeast and Ždralovac to the northwest. Ždralovac is a narrow corridor by which the Livno field is connected to the Grahovsko field, between the slopes of mountains Dinara, Kamešnica and Šator.

=== Climate ===
In the Neolithic age, the field was underwater. On the field itself there remains several lakes, of which Buško Blato has the largest accumulation in the region. Brežinsko jezero is another lake of note which lies on the northwest part of the field. When the Orlovac Hydroelectric Power Plant was built in the 1960s, it altered the climate of the entire Livno region. Long, cold winter months with large snowfalls with the characteristic bura wind, were replaced by rainy winters and long, warm summers.

=== Towns and villages ===
The largest town on the field is Livno, from which the field received its name. The town of Livno has approximately 12,000 inhabitants. It is located on the northeastern part of the field, beneath mount Bašajkovac.

The largest villages on the field are Guber, Grborezi, Podhum, Prolog, Čuklić, Zabrišće, Bila, Čelebić, Lusnić, Strupnić, Kovačić, Vrbica and Bojmunte.

== Hydrology and hydrography ==
Across the Livanjsko field flow several rivers, which belong to the Adriatic watershed. The most important of these are the Žabljak, the Sturba, the Bistrica, the Brina, the Plovuča, the Jaruga and the Ričina which are all rich in trout and crab. An artificial lake, Buško Blato lies to the southeast corner of the polje. It was dammed in the 1970s for electric power generation. Additional projects are in planning which could seriously compromise the delicate hydrological balance of the Dinaric karst, which is crisscrossed by underground rivers.

=== Ramsar wetland site ===
Livanjsko polje is inscribed into Ramsar Wetlands list on 11 April 2008. The area encompassing 45,868 ha, including seasonally flooded agricultural land and alluvial forest, seasonal marshes and ponds, permanent streams such as Bistrica, Sturba, Žabljak, karst springs such as Duman, numerous sinkholes, and the largest peatland in the Balkans.

== History and culture ==
Old Livno fortress (Bistrica town), the historic site.

The field is home to continental vegetable culture such as potatoes and cabbage, livestock, especially cattle and sheep, as well as the production of milk and two famous brands of cheese, known as Livanjski Sir and Cincar cheese.

== See also ==
- Popovo Polje
- Dinarides

== Bibliography ==
- REC Transboundary Cooperation Through the Management of Shared Natural Resources
- INWEB Internationally Shared Surface Water Bodies in the Balkan Region
- Ramsar Convention on Wetlands
- Bosnia and Herzegovina Commission for Preservation of National Monuments
- Wine route Herzegovina
- Hutovo Blato Nature Park
- Hutovo Blato Nature Park — Network of Adriatic Parks
