= Coordination =

Coordination may refer to:

- Coordination (linguistics), a compound grammatical construction
- Coordination complex, consisting of a central atom or ion and a surrounding array of bound molecules or ions
  - A chemical reaction to form a coordination complex
- Coordination number or ligancy of a central atom in a molecule or crystal is the number of atoms, molecules or ions bonded to it
- Language coordination, the tendency of people to mimic the language of others
- Motor coordination, in animal motion
- Gleichschaltung, the process of Nazification in Germany after 1933, often translated as "coordination"

== See also ==
- Coordinate (disambiguation)
- Coordinator (disambiguation)
