= St. John Cemetery (Livno) =

Archaeological site in Bosnia and Herzegovina

- Groblje svetog Ive
- 43°49′34.2″N 17°00′10.0″E
- Periods: Middle Ages
- Location: Livno, Bosnia and Herzegovina
- Region: Tropolje

Site notes
- Archaeologists: Tihomir Glavaš, Mate Zekan
- Public access: Yes

St. John Cemetery is the archaeological site with the remains of the late antique church, tombs and medieval Franciscan monastery dedicated to St. John. The area is situated in the plain of the right bank of the Bistrica River in the center of Livno.

== History ==
Medieval Franciscan monastery in Livno was built between 1340 when the Franciscan vicariate was established in the Kingdom of Bosnia in 1375 when it was mentioned in the earliest list of Franciscan monasteries of the vicariate in the Kingdom of Bosnia.

Monastery was probably burned or during the Ottoman conquest in the late 15th century or during the 17th century. Thereafter, the site has served as a cemetery until the 20th century and during World War II.
