= Bonaventura Božić =

Croatian military writer and translator

- Born: c. 1693; Kijevo, Croatia, Croatia
- Died: 29 December 1761

Bonaventura Božić (c. 1693 – 29 December 1761) was a Croatian military writer and translator.

== Life as a military chaplain ==
Born in Kijevo, southeast of Knin, around 1693, Bonaventura Božić most likely came from a family who immigrated from Čvrljevo. Following his theological and philosophical education, he taught philosophy and artes liberales in Poland and Russia from 1723 until 1726. Then, in October 1726, the Franciscan Order general appointed him as a military chaplain to the Italian regiment in the Austrian army, under the command of Field Marshal F. Marulli, and as a missionary within the Kingdom of Hungary.

Fra Bonaventura left his designated ministry in 1727 and went back to his home province of Dalmatia, which was then ruled by the Republic of Venice. As a result, Bonaventura Božić began serving as a preacher in the coastal areas and a lector of morals in Knin in May 1731. V. Kapitanović claims that after this service, on 17 November 1733, he filed for the position of general lector and probably passed the competitive exam. But after failing to get the desired position at the institution, he was soon again serving abroad: as a military chaplain in Verona, on galleys docked in Venice, in hospitals and barracks, particularly on the Venetian Lido, and in the naval regiment of Zvane Petričević.

== Journeys to Amsterdam and Corfu Island ==
At last, in 1740, Fra Bonaventura set out on a year-long voyage on the ship "Alta San Demetrio" to Amsterdam, the Netherlands. In an unpublished journal titled "Diario overo divertimento di un pasagiero che sulla nave Alta San Demetrio Venezziana faceva il suo viaggio da Venezia in Amsterdam" (the manuscript is kept in the Library of the Franciscan Monastery of St. Lawrence in Šibenik), Bonaventura Božić detailed the journey and military life on board.

In addition, the very next year (1741), after returning from Holland, he journeyed from Venice to the Greek island of Corfu with almost 300 men under the command of lieutenant colonel Ante Kumbat. He served as a military chaplain with the Fanfogna regiment (the Fanfogna family from Zadar) at Verona and Udine, Italy, in 1748. Božić was appointed general lector of the Franciscan general college at Alvinac, Bulgaria, in 1751. He died on 29 December 1761, in Šibenik.

== Teaching and translating work ==
Regarding his work as a teacher and translator, Bonaventura Božić taught philosophy and artes liberales in Poland and Russia (1723.-1726.), was a lector of morals in Knin (May 1731), and it is known that he was appointed general lector at the Franciscan general college in Alvinac, Bulgaria, following its founding in 1751. However, it is unclear if he actually served in this capacity or lived in Bulgaria.

Luka Vladmirović (1718–1788), a contemporary Croatian historical and medical writer, documented for Božić how he "prints in our language Marišal, and how it should do battles on big ships." In addition to this work, according to his diary from a trip to the Netherlands in 1740, Fra Bonaventura translated "L'esercizio del canon" into Croatian.

Additionally, he penned a preface to the work "Militare esercizio illirico" that is included in Leonard Buljan's transcript. Nevertheless, neither the location nor the degree of preservation of Bonaventura Božić's works are known. Vicko Kapitanović concludes by stating that the Franciscan Monastery in Makarska's Archives include the preserved works of this military-naval writer (folder 25).

== The Bonaventura Božić family's possible origins ==
Even though he was born in the village of Kijevo at the end of the seventeenth century, oral tradition states that Bonaventura Božić's ancestors hailed from Čvrljevo in Zagora, around eighteen miles south from Kijevo. Nonetheless, during the 17th century, a number of Božić family members from Zagora were also documented as having distinguished themselves in the battles against the Ottomans during the Cretan War (1645–1669) and Morean War (1684–1699), such as: Jure Božić (who in 1686 captured some member of the renowned Hasan-aga Arapović family), Pavao Božić (who participated in the liberation of Herceg-Novi in 1687), Marko Božić, Mihovil Božić and Grgur Božić (during the siege of Candia 1648-1669). According to the 18th-century Croatian poet Andrija Kačić Miošić, they were from the village of Zvečanje in Poljica, which is approximately 30 miles southeast from Čvrljevo. This family also includes Mihovil Božić (c. 1721–1795), a glagolitic priest and director of the seminary in Priko (Omiš).
