= 2nd Krajina Corps =

2nd Krajina Corps: 2. крајишки корпус
- Active: 19 May 1992 — 17 January 1996
- Country: Republika Srpska
- Allegiance: Army of Republika Srpska
- Branch: Ground Forces
- Type: Motorized; Mountain; Armoured
- Role: The protection of the western parts of Republika Srpska
- Size: 15,000
- Garrison/HQ: Drvar
- Anniversaries: 19 May
- Engagements: Bosnian War

Commanders
- Commander: Radivoje Tomanić; Grujo Borić

2nd Krajina Corps (Serbian: 2. крајишки корпус, 2. krajiški korpus) was one of the six corps of the Army of Republika Srpska (VRS), established on 19 May 1992. Before implementation into the Army of Republika Srpska. Commander of the corps was Radivoje Tomanić and later it was Grujo Borić. The corps numbered 15,000 soldiers. During the War in Bosnia and Herzegovina around 2,000 died.

== Organization ==
The headquarters of the 2nd Krajina Corps was in Drvar. Responsibility zone of the 2nd Krajina corps was determined by Una river, Čaprazije, Velika Golija, Kupres and Donji Vakuf, over 110 km² of front.

== 2nd Krajina Corps Units ==
=== Brigades ===
- 1st Drvar Light Infantry Brigade, HQ Drvar
- 3rd Petrovac Light Infantry Brigade, HQ Petrovac
- 5th Glamoč Light Infantry Brigade, HQ Glamoč
- 7th Krajina Motorized Brigade, HQ Kupres
- 9th Grahovo Light Infantry Brigade, HQ Bosansko Grahovo
- 11th Krupa Light Infantry Brigade, HQ Krupa
- 15th Bihać Infantry Brigade, HQ Ripac
- 17th Ključ Light Infantry Brigade, HQ Ključ

=== Other Units ===
- 21st Independent Armoured Battalion, HQ Petrovac
- 2nd Reconnaissance-Sabotage Detachment, HQ Drvar
- 2nd Military Police Battalion, HQ Drvar
- 2nd Communications Battalion, HQ Drvar
- 2nd Mixed Artillery Regiment, HQ Bosansko Grahovo
- 2nd Light Air Defence Artillery Regiment, HQ Drvar
- 2nd Engineer Regiment, HQ Ključ
- 2nd Auto-transport Battalion, HQ Drvar
- 2nd Medical Battalion, HQ Drvar
- Special Brigade of the Ministry of Internal Affairs, HQ Drvar
- Special Police Units, HQ Drvar
