= Bistrica (Livanjsko Polje) =

River near Livno in Western Bosnia

Bistrica Prokop (artificial riverbed)
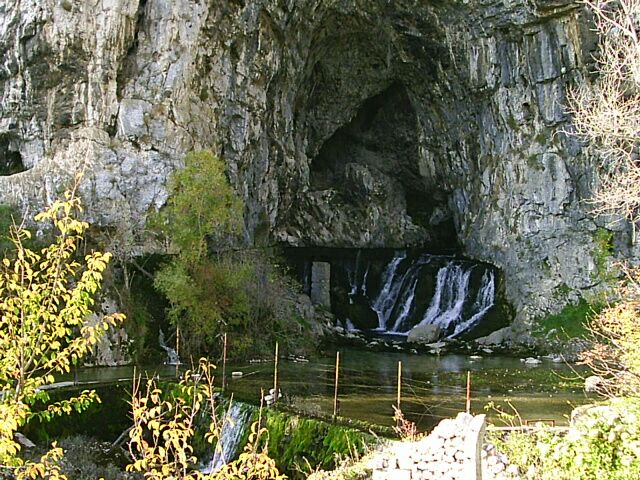
- Duman Wellspring, source of the Bistrica river

- Location within Bosnia and Herzegovina

Location
- Country: Bosnia and Herzegovina
- Municipality: Livno

Physical characteristics
- Source: Duman wellspring
  - location: Old Town of Livno
  - coordinates: 43.832545°N 17.008634°E
- Mouth: Lipsko Lake _{(Buško Blato via Prokop (artificial riverbed) and Ruda in Croatia via Lipska water station)}
  - location: near village of Lipa
  - coordinates: 43.758014°N 16.919026°E
  - elevation: 716 m (2,349 ft)
- Length: 6.3 km (3.9 mi) (unregulated); 20.3 km (12.6 mi) (to Lipsko Lake); 28 km (17 mi) (with reversible canal "Lipsko-Buško")

Basin features
- River system: Buško Blato, Cetina
- Landmarks: Livanjsko Polje
- Tributaries
  - left: Žabljak, Sturba
  - right: Jaz, Plovuča
- Waterbodies: Lipsko lake, Buško Blato
- Bridges: Dumanska Ćuprija

Bistrica (Serbo-Croatian Cyrillic: Бистрица) is sinking river near Livno in Western Bosnia, Bosnia and Herzegovina, though highly regulated for hydropower and irrigation since mid-20th century.

The Bistrica springs out of large karstic source called Vrelo Duman, which is situated within the cave in Duman neighborhood, in the heart of Old Town of Livno, also called as Bistrički Grad (English: Bistrički Town; Bistrički is possessive form made from the river name - Bistrica).

== Flow ==
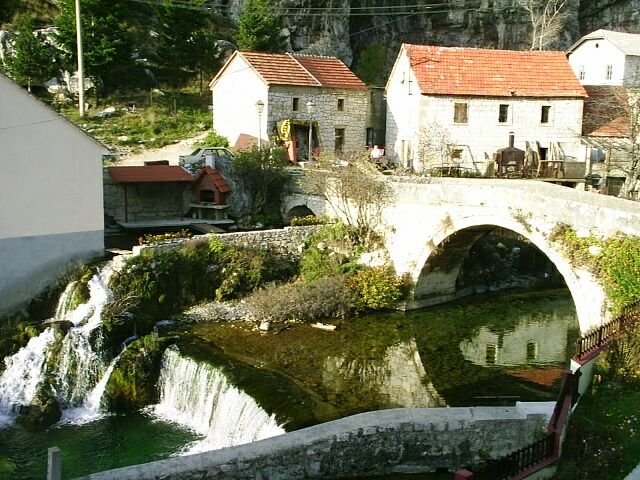
The Bistrica under the old stone bridge called "Firduzova Ćuprija" at Duman (a.k.a. "Dumanska Ćuprija") and old watermills across the river, just downstream from its wellspring Vrelo Duman.

It flows unregulated for roughly 6.3 kilometers through Livanjsko Polje before it reaches section from where the rest of its course it flows regulated through artificially created riverbed, which is simply excavated in soil. From that point river also changes its name, appropriately, to the Prokop, which in English literally translate as a trench, a ditch or dug out canal. Some 1.2 kilometers upstream from there the Bistrica receives the Žabljak river waters from the left. Further down the stream it receives the Sturba river, also from the left. After 14.9 kilometers the Bistrica than receives significant amount of waters from northwestern half of Livanjsko Polje, which is channeled through artificial canal named after existing river, the Plovuča, which still exists in that part of the polje (English: field).

== Hydropower and irrigation system ==
At 20.3 kilometers the Bistrica finally reaches Lipsko Lake, near village of Lipa, which is first and smaller of two artificial reservoirs in hydroelectric power plant system Buško Blato - HE Orlovac, other being Buško Blato reservoir. In this system Lipsko Lake is a compensation basin and serves for regulation of an outflow of water toward intake facility at penstock station "Lipa" at the foot of Kamešnica mountain, and across the border into Croatia where hydroelectric power plant "HE Orlovac" is situated. Lipsko Lake is connected with much larger reservoir of Buško Blato, whose head can rise above head of Lipsko Lake up to several meters, via the reversible canal of "Lipsko-Buško" where it stores an excess waters from Livanjsko Polje and the Bistrica, especially during flooding season and high precipitation periods. For transfer of these waters over the barrage "Podgradina", at village Podgradina, into Buško Blato reservoir, system uses reversible pumping station "Buško Blato", built at the point where canal reaches barrage.

== See also ==
- Bašajkovac
