= Coordinate (disambiguation) =

Coordinate may refer to:

- An element of a coordinate system in geometry and related domains
  - Coordinate space in mathematics
    - Cartesian coordinate system
  - Coordinate (vector space)
  - Geographic coordinate system
- Coordinate structure in linguistics
- Coordinate covalent bond in chemistry
- Coordinate descent, an algorithm

== See also ==
- Coordination (disambiguation)
- Coordinator (disambiguation)
