= Osvaldo Ramous =

Fiuman writer

Osvaldo Ramous (Fiume, 11.10.1905 - Rijeka, March 1981) was a prominent Fiuman writer from the city of Rijeka (the former city-state of Fiume, then a part of Italy), who wrote in the Italian language. His diverse works include poetry, prose, drama, essayist prose, criticism, journalism, culture organization, editorial work, translation, and he was also a director of cultural institutions.

== Biography ==
Born in 1905 in the Old Town (Zitavecia) of Rijeka, he was the youngest of six children of Marie Giacich and Adolf Ramous. His father died when Osvaldo was two and the family moved to the hilly suburb of Belveder. His uncle Nazio took care of the children and discovered Osvaldo's musical and literary talents. He attended the Municipal School of Music for four years, then continued private studies in violin and piano. He attended the Leonardo da Vinci Technical Institute from 1924 to 1925 and then enrolled in the "Egisto Russi" Teacher Training Institute. Ramous then worked as a journalist, employed as a literary and music critic of the Fiume-based daily La Vedetta d'Italia, and in 1923 and in 1924 collaborated with the cultural magazines Delta and Fiumanella.

In 1936 he married Matilde Meštrović, granddaughter of the Croatian sculptor Ivan Meštrović. In 1938 he published his first collection of poems under the title "U tršćaku - Nel canneto" in the magazine Delta, which received a special recognition from the Royal Academy of Italy. From 1930 to 1942 he worked for the Rijeka daily paper La Vedetta d'Italia, then in 1944 he became editor of the same paper a few months after the occupation of Rijeka by the Yugoslav army. He was, however, associated with the Italian Resistance Movement and interrogated by the Gestapo in 1944.

After the war, he became a member of the National Theater Administration in Rijeka, which was then a part of Yugoslavia. He became the director of the Italian theatre there until his retirement in 1961. He was intensely involved in translation work, especially songs from French, Spanish and South Slavic languages. He edited and translated the first anthology of contemporary Yugoslav poets called "Poesia Jugoslava Contemporanea". This anthology was published in 1959 (six years before the establishment of political and cultural relations between Italy and Yugoslavia), and included 55 poets including Croats, Serbs, Slovenes and Macedonians. In addition to these songs, he also translated the dramas of Branislav Nušić ("Dr and Pokojnik"), Ivo Vojnović ("Ekvinocija"), Mirko Božić ("Ljuljačka u tuznoj vrbi") and Draga Ivaniševića ( Ljubav u koroti ).

In 1951 he married Nevenka Malić, head of the Children's Theater in Rijeka. As a regular collaborator of the local radio, Television and Radio Koper in Italian, he sent his translations of Nušić, Andrić, Krleža and thus contributed to the knowledge and spread of cultures of different peoples and to cultural mediation between Italy and Yugoslavia. Thanks to Osvaldo Ramous, Rijeka, Ljubljana, Zagreb, Belgrade, Sarajevo and Koper guest the "Piccolo Teatro" of Milan, with the performance of Carlo Goldoni's, "Arlecchino servitore di due padroni".

He also organised a Congress of Italian and Croatian writers in Cittadella in 1964, in a period when Yugoslav relations to Italy had not yet been solved, so communication was difficult. Unpublished documents of the Association of Yugoslav Writers suggest intentional sabotage of this meeting and an invitation to Croatian, Serbian, Bosnian and Slovene writers not to attend this Congress. Ramous managed to overcome this barrier and the gathering was held without any successful external political influence.

In addition to collections of songs, he published novels, stories, essays, dramas and radio plays. As a poet, Ramous belongs to the lyricists, intimates, sensitivists and descriptuals. His lyrical verses are often devoted to the unstoppable nature of time and passage of life. Modern criticism has recognized the features of a restrained modernism in them. For his works Ramous was awarded many awards. In addition to the aforementioned distinction, he also received the Premio Cittadella (Gold Medal) in 1955 for the "Vento sullo stagno" collection, and the Premio Cervia in 1963 for the collection of Risveglio di Medea, a Gold Medal for the novel L'ora di Minutopoli. In 1965, he was awarded the City of Rijeka Award for the collection "Vento sullo stagno" and the novel "Galebovi na krovu". He died in Rijeka in 1981.

== Main works ==
Poetic collections

- Nel canneto, 1938.
- Vento sullo stagno, 1953.
- Pianto vegetale, 1960.
- Il vino della notte, 1964.
- Risveglio di Medea, 1967.
- Realtà dell'assurdo, 1973.
- Pietà delle cose, 1977.
- Viaggio quotidiano, 1982.

Novels

- I gabbiani sul tetto, („Galebovi na krovu“) 1964.
- Serenata alla morte, 1965.
- Il cavallo di cartapesta („Kaširani konj“), 2007.

Dramas and comedies

- Un duello, 1935.
- Edizione straordinaria, 1951.
- Lotta con l'ombra, 1959.
- La mia ocarina, 1961.
- Il farmaco portentoso, 1963.
- Con un piede nell'acqua, 1969.
- Un cuore quasi umano, 1970.
- Guido, i' vorrei che tu, Lapo ed io..., 1972.
- Un attimo solo, 1974.
- Le pecore e il mostro, 1976.
- Viaggio senza meta, 1976.
- Sull'onda degli echi, 1977.
