= Buško Lake =

Lake in Bosnia and Herzegovina

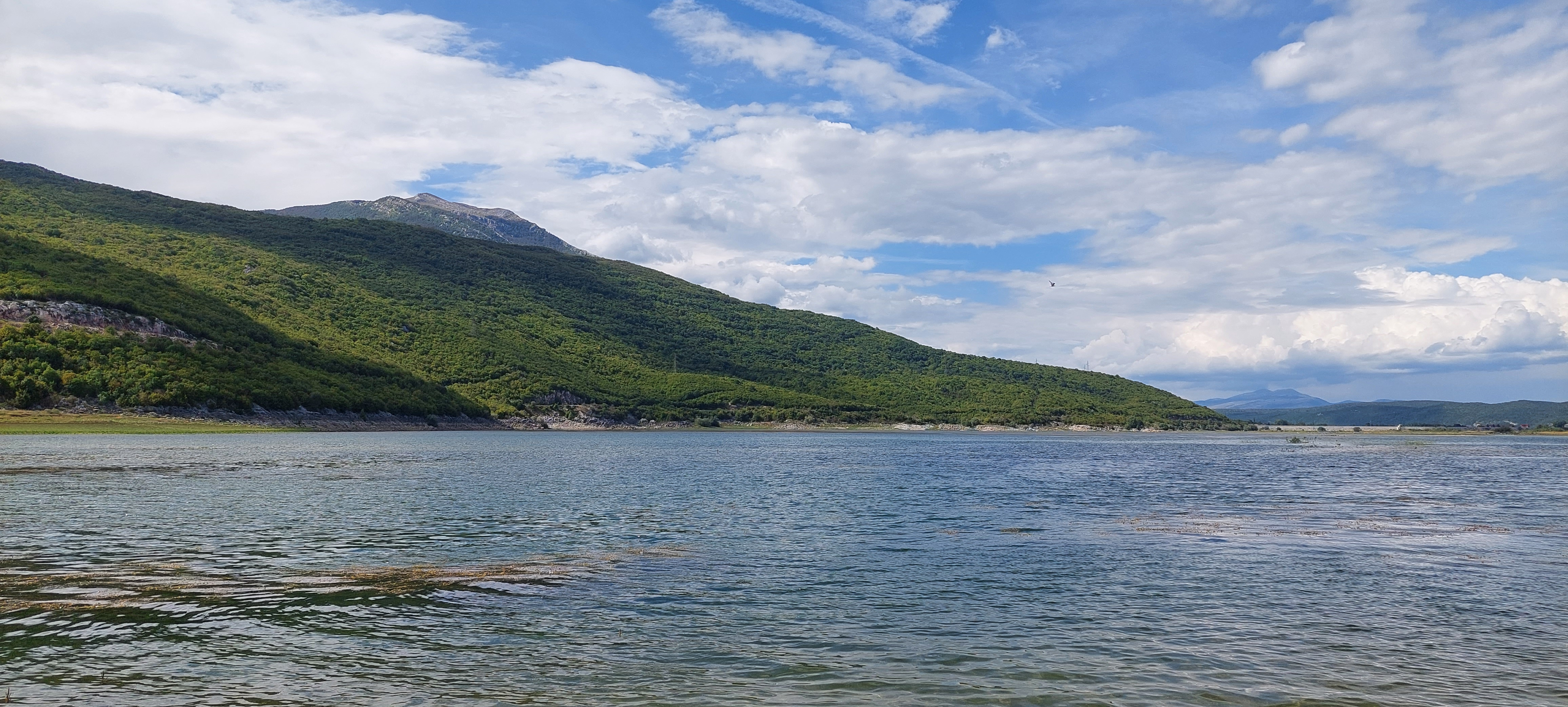

- Location in Bosnia
- Location: Livno field, Duvno field
- Coordinates: 43.6297°N 17.0528°E
- Basin countries: Bosnia and Herzegovina
- Surface area: 55.8 km^{2} (21.5 sq mi)
- Water volume: 782 million cubic metres (634,000 acre⋅ft)
- Surface elevation: 716 m (2,349 ft)
- Settlements: Livno; Tomislavgrad

Buško Lake, also known as Buško Blato or Buško Jezero, is an accumulation lake located near the Croatian border on the south side of Livanjsko Polje and northwest of Duvanjsko Polje in Canton 10, a canton of the Federation of Bosnia and Herzegovina, one of the two entities of Bosnia and Herzegovina. The name is also a reference to the area surrounding the lake which includes a number of villages, of which Prisoje is the largest.

== Hydrography ==
Buško Blato lake, as well as entire watershed system, is a man-made, draining waters of karst aquifer of poljes of Western Herzegovina and Western Bosnia regions, in the heart of Bosnia and Herzegovina Dinaric Alps. These are almost exclusively sinking rivers, draining waters of Livanjsko Polje, Duvanjsko Polje and Kupreško Polje through system of ponors and estavelles (sinkholes), subterranean flows, and karstic wellsprings.

The actual lake is elevated 716 m above sea level, has an area of 55.8 km^{2} and a total volume of 782 million m³. One third of the area falls under the jurisdiction of the municipality of Livno while the remaining two-thirds belongs to the municipality of Tomislavgrad. The total area of Buško Blato makes it one of the largest accumulation lakes in all of Europe.

== Nature and ecology ==
The lake also consists of a rich and wide assortment of fish such as carp, minnow-nase, Prussian carp, and chub, Zander, Wels catfish, Trout, Carp.

== Hydropower and irrigation system ==
Buško Blato (blato meaning 'mud' or 'swamp' in Bosnian) was essentially farmland up until 1974 when it was converted into a lake (artificial reservoir). The hydroelectric power plant system was conceived mainly to provide electricity for the Dalmatian coastline and further development of tourism.

The governments of Bosnia and Herzegovina and Croatia (republics within Yugoslavia at the time) worked together on a project to build a hydroelectric power plant in Ruda (municipality of Otok in Croatia) called HE Orlovac that would have an output of 237 MW and an average annual yield of 366 GWh. The Bistrica river is largest, and forms Lipsko Lake, near village of Lipa, which is first and smaller of two artificial reservoirs in hydroelectric power plant system Buško Blato - HE Orlovac, other being Buško Blato reservoir. In this system Lipsko Lake is a compensation basin and serves for regulation of an outflow of water toward intake facility at penstock station "Lipa" at the foot of Kamešnica mountain, and across the border into Croatia where hydroelectric power plant "HE Orlovac" is situated. Lipsko Lake is connected with much larger reservoir of Buško Blato, whose head can rise above head of Lipsko Lake up to several meters, via the reversible canal of "Lipsko-Buško" where it stores an excess waters from Livanjsko Polje and the Bistrica, especially during flooding season and high precipitation periods. For transfer of these waters over the barrage "Podgradina", at village Podgradina, into Buško Blato reservoir, system uses reversible pumping station "Buško Blato", built at the point where canal reaches barrage.
