= Sturba (Livanjsko Polje) =

Watercourse

Sturba Стурба
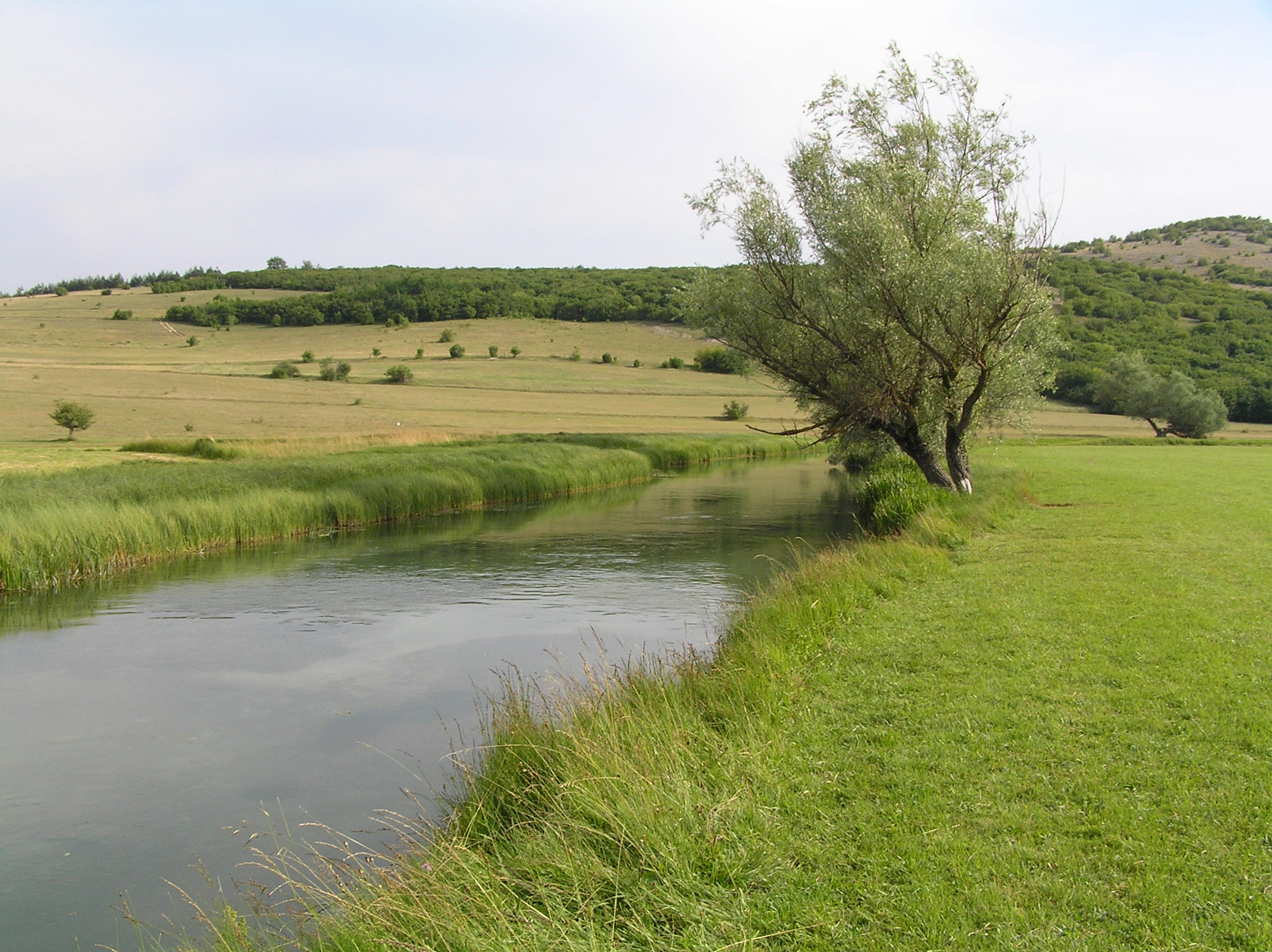
- Sturba River, flowing through Livanjsko polje

- Location within Bosnia and Herzegovina

Location
- Country: Bosnia and Herzegovina
- Municipality: Livno

Physical characteristics
- Source: Sturba wellspring
  - location: Sturba village near Livno
  - coordinates: 43.774256°N 17.023319°E
- Mouth: Bistrica (Prokop)
  - location: Livanjsko Polje
  - coordinates: 43.842072°N 16.930863°E
- Length: 0 km (0 mi)

Basin features
- River system: Buško Blato, Cetina
- Landmarks: Livanjsko Polje
- Tributaries
  - left: Bralin Potok, Jezerac, Vrilo, Bioštica
- Waterbodies: Lipsko lake, Buško Blato

Sturba (Serbian Cyrillic: Стурба) is a river in Western Bosnia and Herzegovina, and flows through Livanjsko Polje near Livno in Bosnia and Herzegovina. Water temperatures can reach up to 14 °C thanks to the area's 100 sunny days each year.
