= Dobrivoje =

Dobrivoje (Cyrillic script: Добривоје) is a masculine given name of Slavic origin. Notable people with the name include:

- Dobrivoje Božić (1885–1967), Serbian inventor
- Dobrivoje Marković (born 1986), Serbian handballer
- Dobrivoje Trivić (1943–2013), Serbian footballer
