= Dragan Božić =

Dragan Božić may refer to:

- Dragan Božić (Serbian politician, born 1959), Serbian politician
- Dragan Božić (Serbian politician, born 1969), Serbian politician
