= Cincar (disambiguation) =

Cincar is a mountain in Bosnia and Herzegovina.

Cincar may also refer to:

- The Aromanians (sometimes known in Slavic countries as "Tsintars" or "Cincars"), a Romance ethnic group in the Balkans
- Operation Cincar, 1994 Croatian military operation near Kupres, Bosnia and Herzegovina
