= Vrbica, Livno =

Vrbica
- Village
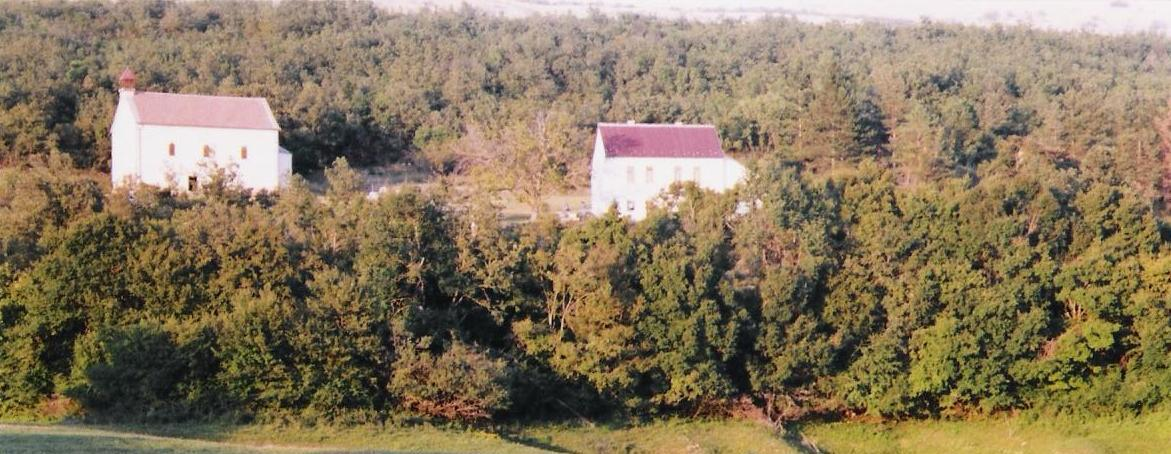

- Location within Bosnia and Herzegovina
- Coordinates: 43°59′49″N 16°42′16″E
- Country: Bosnia and Herzegovina
- Entity: Federation of Bosnia and Herzegovina
- Canton: Canton 10
- Township: Livno

Area
  - Total: 20.02 km^{2} (7.73 sq mi)

Population (2013)
  - Total: 13
  - Density: 0.65/km^{2} (1.7/sq mi)
- Time zone: UTC+1 (CET)
  - Summer (DST): UTC+2 (CEST)

Vrbica is a village in the Township of Livno in Canton 10 of the Federation of Bosnia and Herzegovina, an entity of Bosnia and Herzegovina. The name of the village means little "small willow" in Serbian.

== Geography ==
Vrbica directly overlooks the most prominent peak of Dinara – Troglav. In 1991, 76 people lived in Vrbica.

Vrbica is a village, among other nearby villages, known for the hospitality of its inhabitants, who, especially before the war, welcomed travellers on their way to the coast. Among the people who came from Vrbica, Dr. Branko Dokic stands out.

== Culture ==
=== Vrbica Monastery ===
When Vrbica was occupied by Croatian Army forces and HVO members, the Serbian Orthodox Church of the Descent of the Holy Spirit in Vrbica was burned together with its valuables, except for its icons, which were saved.

In October 2009, comprehensive remediation work began. By the decision of the Bishop of Bihać-Petrovac, Mr. Chrysostom, the church in Vrbica was declared a monastery. Monastery Vrbica 5 is the fifth monastery in the Diocese of Bihać-Petrovac. The official proclamation of the monastery is expected, which involves the adoption and adoption of decisions and documents, such as the monastery tipik, etc.

=== Illyrian Cemetery ===
As is the case with several other nearby villages (e.g. Bastasi), excavations from the period when the Illyrians lived in Livanjsko Polje were found in Vrbica. It is Vrbic Cemetery and the area around the church where the remains were found, most probably Illyria. The vastness of the Livanjsko Polje suspects the existence of even more such sites.

== History ==
During World War II, Vrbica remained famous for an event that is long remembered. When the Drvar offensive was made, Tito and his army retreated east. He did not bypass Vrbica, where he spent the night, to recover from the fierce fighting with the Germans.

Vrbica became known at the beginning of the 20th century for Marc Léger, a former member of the BiH peacekeeping force who served in the Livno area. Namely, after the deaths in Afghanistan on April 17, 2002, Vrbica residents sent a letter of condolences to Léger's widow in Canada.

Touched by this gesture, his wife, Marlej Léger, decided to thank Vrbica and the Vrbicans in an original way. Thanks to her activity and desire, the school (parish home) and the Orthodox church – the largest in the area – were restored

== Populace ==
Vrbica's population is of Serb ethnicity, which has declined dramatically since the last war. Currently, a small number of returnees live in the village.

Nationality	1961.	1971.	1981.	1991.	2013.
Serbs	227	179	110	75	
Yugoslavs	1	3		1	
Croats	1	3			
Macedonians		1			
Unknown					
Total	229	186	110	76	18

According to the 2013 census, its population was 13, all Serbs.

== Bibliography ==
- Ethnicity/National Affiliation, Religion and Mother Tongue (PDF). Sarajevo: Agency for Statistics of Bosnia and Herzegovina. 2019.
