= Tušnica =

Mountain in Livno, Bosnia and Herzegovina

Coordinates: 43°43′N 17°07′E

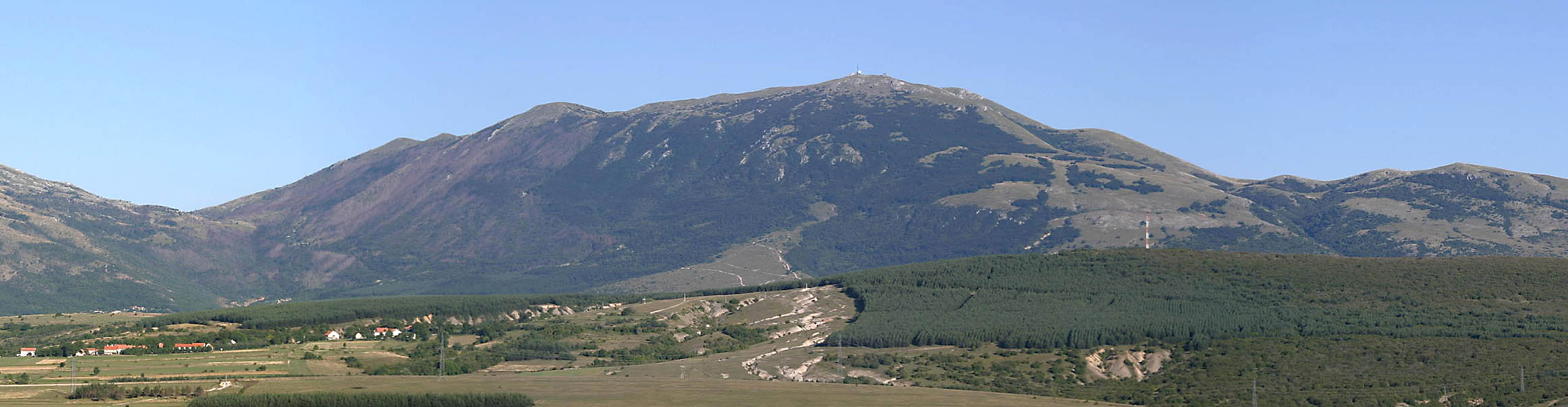
View of Tušnica

Tušnica is a mountain in the municipality of Livno, Bosnia and Herzegovina. It has an altitude of 1,697 metres (5,568 ft).

== See also ==
- List of mountains in Bosnia and Herzegovina
