= KK Livno =

- Leagues: Herzeg-Bosnia League
- Founded: 2005
- Location: Livno, BiH
- Team colors: Red and black

KK Livno (Košarkaški Klub Livno) is a basketball club based in Livno, Bosnia and Herzegovina. KK Livno currently competes in the Herzeg-Bosnia League.

== History ==
The club was founded in 2005 after their more notable predecessor, KK Troglav Livno, folded due to financial problems and debts.
