= Bašajkovac =

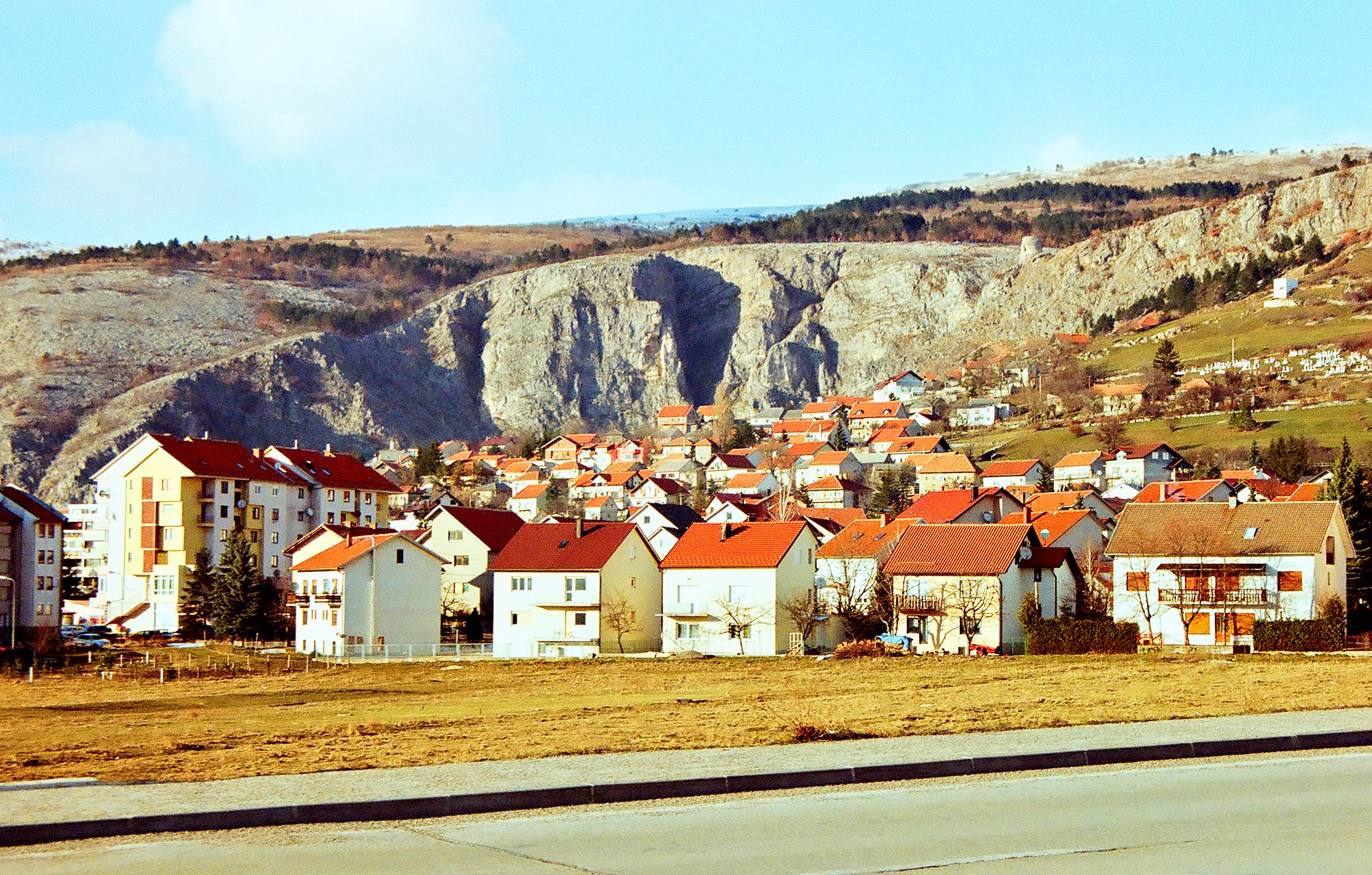
- View of Bašajkovac hill

Highest point
- Coordinates: 43°49′00″N 17°00′21″E

Geography
- Location within Bosnia and Herzegovina
- Location: Bosnia and Herzegovina
- Parent range: Dinaric Alps

Bašajkovac (Serbian Cyrillic: Башајковац) is a karst hill which rises northeast of town Livno in Bosnia and Herzegovina. At the bottom of the hill there is spring of Bistrica River called Duman.

== History ==
On the slopes of Bašajkovac hill there are remains of ancient Roman fortifications, as well as Livno's Upper Town also known as Bistrica Town, which was built by medieval Ottoman rulers. The fortification wall of Upper Town has a few preserved towers including popular Weiss or Vujadin Tower.

== See also ==
- List of mountains in Bosnia and Herzegovina
