= Zvečanje =

Settlement in Split-Dalmatia County, Croatia

- Settlement
- Interactive map of Zvečanje
- Location of Zvečanje in Croatia
- Coordinates: 43°27′09″N 16°46′01″E
- Country: Croatia
- County: Split-Dalmatia
- City: Omiš

Area
  - Total: 6.2 km^{2} (2.4 sq mi)

Population (2021)
  - Total: 207
  - Density: 33/km^{2} (86/sq mi)
- Time zone: UTC+1 (CET)
  - Summer (DST): UTC+2 (CEST)
- Postal code: 21310 Omiš
- Area code: +385 (0)21

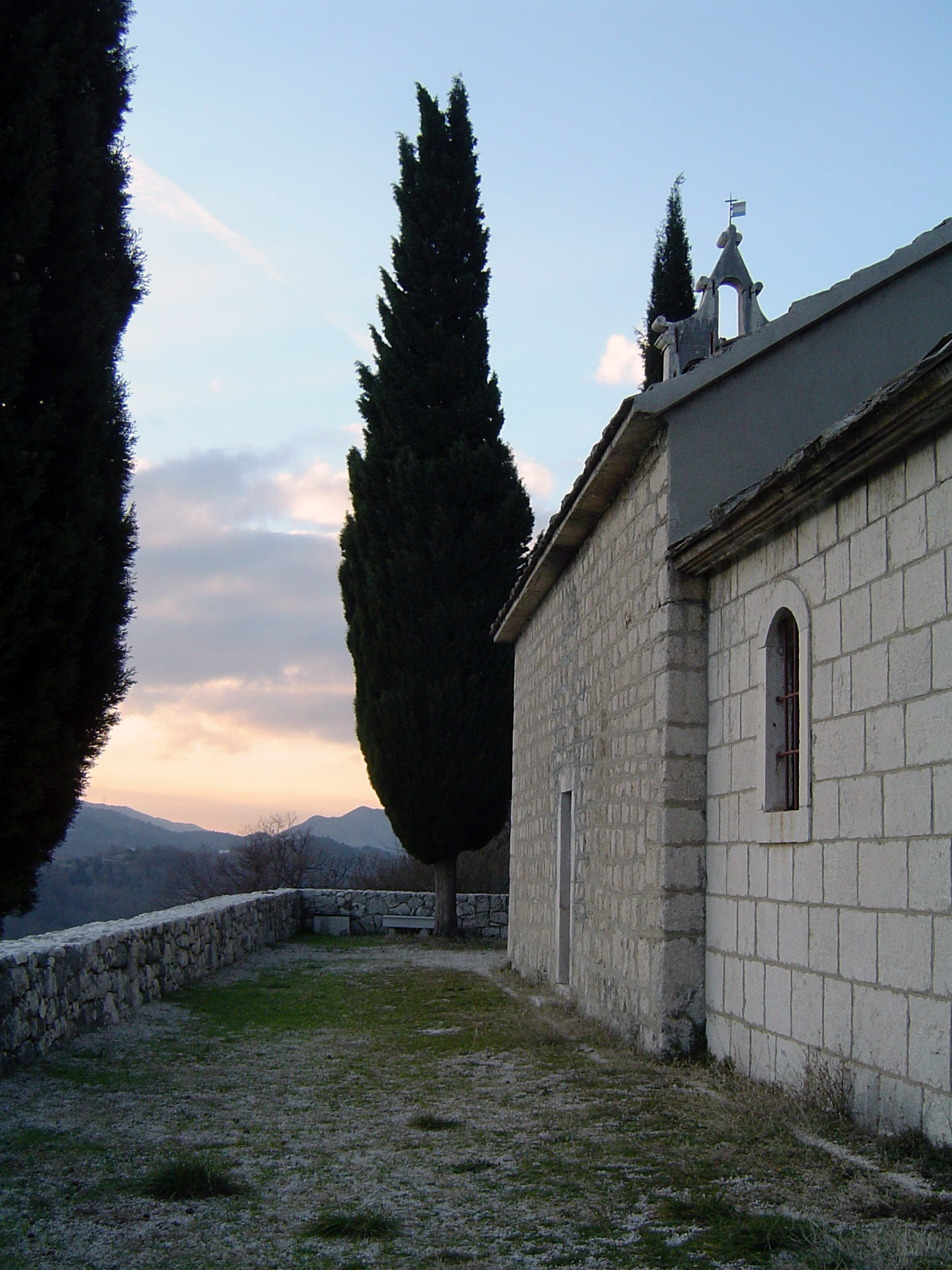
Zvečanje

Zvečanje is a settlement in the City of Omiš in Croatia. In 2021, its population was 207.

== Demographics ==
Zvečanje: Population trends 1857–2021
v

population	278	398	286	286	329	379	410	417	402	408	337	304	253	233	210	202	207
	1857	1869	1880	1890	1900	1910	1921	1931	1948	1953	1961	1971	1981	1991	2001	2011	2021

Sources: Croatian Bureau of Statistics publications

== Notable people ==
Mihovil Božić (c. 1721–1795) glagolitic priest and director of the seminary in Priko (Omiš)

Nikola Miličević (1887 - 1963), Croatian astronomer and priest

Nikola Milićević (1922 - 1999), Croatian writer and translator
