= Croatian Nobility Association =

The Croatian Nobility Association (Croatian: Hrvatski plemićki zbor, HPZ) is an organization of the descendants of the Croatian nobility, created in 1995 by descendants of noble families from Dalmatia, northern Croatia and other Croatian regions. It is member association of the European Commission of the Nobility (CILANE).

== History ==
In November 1995, a group of thirteen founders led by Croatian scientist Prof. Nikola Cindro established the Croatian Nobility Association. From the beginning, the Association included descendants of noble families from Croatia's south (Dubrovnik, Split), central (Lika), around (Zagreb), and other historical regions.

The Association's mission is to bring together all remaining descendants of Croatian nobility in order to maintain the historical tradition and patriotism. The organization has its own coat of arms and statute, and its headquarters are in Zagreb, with branches in Split, Osijek, and Zadar. The HPZ has the following organs: the Great Nobiliary Council, the Nobiliary Board, the Supervisory Board, the Court of Honor, and the Senate. Nikola pl. Cindro was the first president, followed by Ante pl. Rendić - Miočević and the late Ivo pl. Durbešić. Radovan Marjanović - Kavanagh is the current president, succeeding Marko Mladineo and acting Branko Cindro.

The Association has approximately 202 regular members who are descendants of seventy seven noble families.

== Noble houses of the Croatian Nobility Association ==
- Alaupović
- Aranicki
- Arneri
- Barabaš
- Blažeković
- Borelli
- Cambj
- Despalatović
- Franulić
- Grisogono
- Gozze
- Hadrović
- Husinec
- Köröskeny
- Košćec
- Kurelec
- Laszowski
- Luković
- Lukšić
- Makanec
- Marjanović Kavanagh
- Michieli
- Mihačić
- Oršić
- Pavlović I
- Petriciolli
- Rendić-Miočević
- Tartaglia
- Puškarić
- Zergollern
- Bona
- Cindro
- Maleković
- Antoniazzo
- Pavlović II
- Sdrinias
- Kallay
- Vusio
- Mirošević-Sorgo
- Raizner
- Celio-Cega
- Degl´Ivellio
- Marušić
- Vucelić
- Durbešić
- Ivanišević
- Kuščić
- Franceschi
- Vrkljan
- Maroja
- Bartholovich
- Pomper
- Prelogović
- Draganić-Vrančić
- Benković
- Trupčević
- Kačić-Bartulović
- Jelačić Bužimski
- Mladineo
- Zmajević
- Pažić
- Marijašević
- Portada
- Antonioli
- Tončić
- Pozojević
- Valjak
- Vučetić
- Baturić
- Zudenigo
- Davila
- Nutrizio
- Tabain
- Jurjević
- Hreljanović
- Rakamarić
- Gazzari
