= Bob Bozic =

Canadian boxer (born 1950)

Robert Bozic (born 1950) is a former professional heavyweight boxer from Toronto, Canada, between 1970-77. His boxing record was 14-3 (7 KOS). He fought and lost to Larry Holmes in Madison Square Garden in 1973.

Bob Bozic's father, Dobrivoje Božić, was a successful Serbian engineer who fled from Communism after World War II and emigrated to Canada. In the 1960s Bob Bozic became estranged from his father and was living in Toronto, a vagrant by choice. He was introduced to prize fighting by Bertie Mignacco, a local heavy who ran a bookmaking operation behind Ciro's restaurant. In his short career he had 17 fights, but after three losses he decided to end his boxing career. He used to spar with George Chuvalo, his friend.

Bozic used to work as a bartender in New York City at Fanelli Cafe.

== Professional boxing record ==
Professional record summary
17 fights	14 wins	3 losses
By knockout	7	1
By decision	7	2

No.	Result	Record	Opponent	Type	Date	Location
17	Loss	14-3	(United States) Harry Terrell	TKO	8 Dec 1977	(Canada) C.N.E Coliseum, Toronto
16	Win	14-2	(Samoa) Koroseta Kid	MD	12 Nov 1974	(United States) Honolulu International Center, Honolulu
15	Win	13-2	(United States) Mel Marshall	SD	22 Aug 1974	(United States) Olympic Auditorium, Los Angeles
14	Loss	12-2	(United States) Larry Holmes	UD	10 Sep 1973	(United States) Madison Square Garden, New York
13	Loss	12-1	(United States) Tommy Kost	SD	5 Jan 1973	(United States) Madison Square Garden, New York
12	Win	12-0	(United States) G. G. Maldonado	DQ	20 Sep 1972	(United States) Madison Square Garden, New York
11	Win	11-0	(United States) Brian O'Melia	UD	29 Oct 1971	(United States) Madison Square Garden, New York
10	Win	10-0	(Canada) Kenny Shea	KO	19 Aug 1971	(Canada) C.N.E Coliseum, Toronto
9	Win	9-0	(Canada) John Williams	KO	15 July 1971	(Canada) Toronto
8	Win	8-0	(Canada) Len Couture	KO	15 Oct 1970	(Canada) Maple Leaf Gardens, Toronto
7	Win	7-0	(United States) Kenny Baker	KO	20 Aug 1970	(Canada) C.N.E Coliseum, Toronto
6	Win	6-0	(United States) Brian O'Melia	UD	4 Aug 1970	(United States) Madison Square Garden, New York
5	Win	5-0	(United States) Walt Dolder	PTS	8 Jun 1970	(Canada) York Centre Ballroom, Toronto
4	Win	4-0	(United States) Walt Dolder	PTS	4 May 1970	(Canada) Toronto
3	Win	3-0	(Canada) Yvon Savage	KO	7 Apr 1970	(Canada) Toronto
2	Win	2-0	(United States) Jim Hall	KO	27 Feb 1970	(Canada) Toronto
1	Win	1-0	(United States) Al Hugley	TKO	27 Jan 1970	(Canada) Royal York Hotel, Toronto
