= Elena Božić Talijan =

Serbian politician

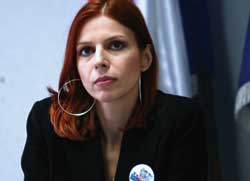
Elena Božić Talijan in 2012

Elena Božić Talijan (Serbian Cyrillic: Елена Божић Талијан; born 7 September 1970) is a journalist and politician in Serbia. She has served in the City Assembly of Belgrade and the National Assembly of Serbia as a member of the far-right Serbian Radical Party (Srpska radikalna stranka, SRS) and was the party's secretary-general from 2008 to 2012.

== Journalist ==
Božić Talijan worked for Radio Novosti in the 1990s, and in 2000 she worked for Studio B. For several years, she was the editor of Velika Srbija, the Radical Party's journal. She has contributed to the newspaper Novosti since withdrawing from active political life in 2012.

== Election supervisor ==
Božić Talijan was appointed to the election commission of the Federal Republic of Yugoslavia prior to the 2000 general election.

She was later appointed by the SRS to a multi-party committee entrusted with overseeing media coverage of the 2000 Serbian parliamentary election and was chosen by the committee's membership as its chair. The committee – which was dominated by parties that comprised the government of Serbia prior to Slobodan Milošević's fall from power – contended that the Democratic Opposition of Serbia (Demokratska opozicija Srbije, DOS) was benefitting from disproportionate and favourable coverage in the Serbia media. After the election, Božić Talijan held a press conference in which she argued that Serbian media outlets had competed with each other in "disregarding legal norms" to support the DOS and that the committee would seek the annulment of the elections. When the sole DOS member of the committee dissented from this statement, Božić Talijan abruptly left the press conference without any explanation. The elections were not annulled.

== Politician ==
Božić Talijan appeared in the sixteenth position on the SRS's electoral list for the Belgrade city assembly in the 2004 Serbian local elections and received a mandate when the party won twenty-seven seats. The Democratic Party (Demokratska stranka, DS) won the election, and the Radicals served in opposition.

Božić Talijan later received the twenty-second position on the Radical Party's list in the 2007 Serbian parliamentary election. The list won eighty-one seats, and she was included afterward in her party's assembly delegation. (From 2000 to 2011, Serbian parliamentary mandates were awarded to sponsoring parties or coalitions rather than to individual candidates, and it was common practice for mandates to be assigned out of numerical order. Božić Talijan was not automatically elected by virtue of her position on the list, although she was given a mandate all the same.) Although the Radicals won more seats than any other party in this election, they fell well short of a majority and ultimately served in opposition. Božić Talijan chaired the assembly committee on gender equality and was a member of the committee for poverty reduction.

She resigned from the Belgrade city assembly after being elected to the national parliament. The date of her resignation does not appear in Belgrade's Official Gazette, though it no occurred later than 11 September 2007, when her replacement was granted a mandate.

Božić Talijan was given the sixteenth position on the SRS's list in the 2008 parliamentary election and was chosen for another term when the list won seventy-eight mandates. The results of this election were inconclusive, but the For a European Serbia (Za evropsku Srbiju, ZES) alliance led by the DS ultimately formed a coalition government with the Socialist Party of Serbia (Socijalistička partija Srbije, SPS), and the Radicals remained in opposition. The SRS faced a serious split later in the year, when several of its members joined the breakaway Serbian Progressive Party (Srpska napredna stranka, SNS) under the leadership of Tomislav Nikolić and Aleksandar Vučić. Božić Talijan remained with the Radicals. She continued to chair the committee on gender equality.

On 20 September 2008, Božić Talijan was chosen to be Vučić's replacement as secretary-general of the SRS. She resigned from parliament a year later to focus on her administrative responsibilities; her resignation was initially declined by the legislature, but it became official on 24 December 2009.

Serbia's electoral system was reformed in 2011, such that all mandates were awarded in numerical order to candidates on successful lists. Božić Talijan appeared in the third position on the SRS's list in the 2012 parliamentary election. The party did not cross the electoral threshold to win representation in the assembly. Božić Talijan resigned as secretary-general after the election and has not been politically active since this time.
