= Božić Božićević =

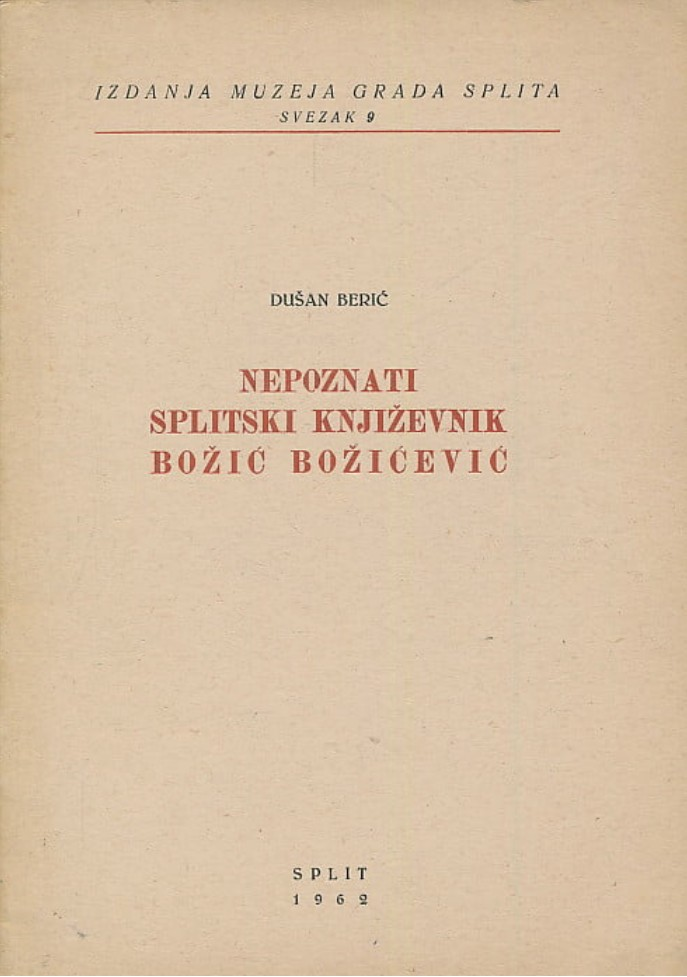
- Book cover "Nepoznati splitski književnik Božić Božićević" (published 1962) by D. Berić
- Born: c. 1554; Split
- Died: c. June 1616; Sutivan, Brač
- Occupations: Poet, nobleman
- Writing career
- Genre: Long poem
- Notable work: Istorija svetoga Ivana Zlatoustoga
- Movement: Renaissance

Božić Božićević (Latin: Natal Natali, Nadal Nadali, c. 1554 – c. June 1644), a poet and nobleman from Split. The author of the long poem „Istorija svetoga Ivana Zlatoustoga“.

== Biography ==
Božić Božićević was born in Split around 1554. He was a member of the Split-Brač noble family, from the branch that dwelt mainly in Sutivan. The family is first documented among the members of the Split Great Council in 1398, and its last name is listed as: Natalis, Natali, Nadali, Božićević, Božić.

Božić was named in 1615 and 1637 as a defensor and judge of the Brač commune for Sutivan. According to Brač parish registers, he was a witness at a wedding in 1618 and a godfather at a christening in 1629. In the year 1633. He raised the family tomb and had an epitaph engraved with seven twelve-syllable lines that rhymed twice. He most likely died during the plague outbreak of June 1644.

== Poem "Istorija svetoga Ivana Zlatoustoga" ==
The author wrote the long poem "Istorija svetoga Ivana Zlatoustoga" which is a highly free version of the Italian poetry legend "La storia di S. Giovanni Boccadoro", of an unknown author from the 15th century. Božić Božićević, a post-Marulić poet, translated the Italian original into double-rhymed twelve-syllable lines with a carry-over rhyme, resulting in a poem with both Marulić-like stylistic qualities and unique characteristics. His very loose paraphrase has 372 lines, whereas the original had 288. Despite its origins in the 17th century, the long poem is stylistically and thematically closer to Marko Marulić than to Baroque literature.

Božić Božićević was identified as a poet in 1944. by J. Aranza who published the epic poem "Počinje istorija svetoga Ivana Zlatoustoga kako učini pokoru za sfoj grih, složena po Božiću Božićeviću Splićaninu" based on a fragmentary 17th-century manuscript (now in the Rare Books Collection of the National and University Library in Zagreb). Aranza identified the author as a contemporary of Marko Marulić. based on language characteristics. Two more complete copies of the long poem were already known from the property of Jakša Čedomil (Jakov Čuka), but without the author's name. So, in 1938 Franjo Fancev published those copies from Čedomil (Čuka) property and dated its origin back to the 15th or early 16th century.
