= Language coordination =

Language coordination is the tendency of people to mimic the language of others. The coordination occurs when one person responds to another using similar vocabulary, or word or sentence structure. Language coordination can also be applied to individuals, who linguistically coordinate to a group. As suggested by the communication accommodation theory, this is often used as a way to reduce social distance (convergence). Language coordination often occurs unconsciously.
