= Velika Golija =

Mountain in the municipality of Livno, Bosnia and Herzegovina

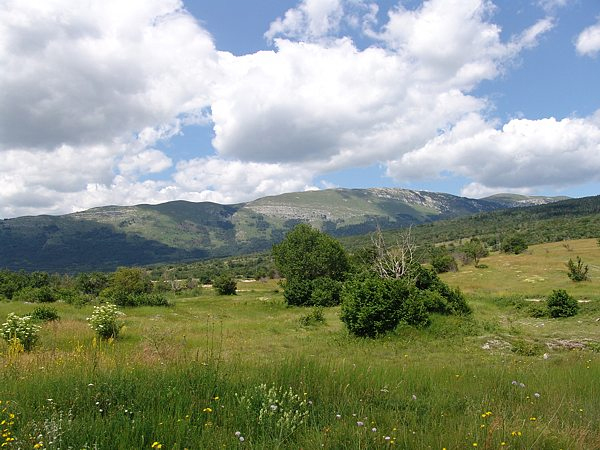
- from 2007

Highest point
- Elevation: 1,890 m (6,200 ft)
- Coordinates: 43°57′30″N 16°51′18″E

Geography
- Location within Bosnia and Herzegovina
- Location: Bosnia and Herzegovina
- Parent range: Dinaric Alps

Velika Golija is a mountain in the municipality of Livno, Bosnia and Herzegovina. It has an altitude of 1,890 metres (6,200 ft).

== See also ==
- List of mountains in Bosnia and Herzegovina
