= Mihovil Božić =

Mihovil (Mihovijo) Božić (c. 1721 - 2 December 1795) was a Croatian Catholic Glagolitic priest, teacher and principal of the Glagolitic seminary in Priko (Omiš).

== Life and work ==
Mihovil (or Mihovijo) Božić was born circa 1721 in the village of Zvečanje, located in the Dalmatian hinterland, not far from the town of Omiš. He was educated by a private tutor and, as a Glagolitic priest, passed his exams in 1750 at the newly established Glagolitic seminary in Priko, an area now part of the city of Omiš. Mihovil Božić stayed there for the remainder of his life, serving initially as an assistant teacher and tutor, later as head teacher, and from 1759 onwards as principal. He died on December 2, 1795. in Priko.

Considering his translator work Božić's remarks about the first volume of the Glagolitic Breviary (publishen in Rome in 1791) are stored in the Propaganda archive in Rome. This volume was sent for revision to the Archbishop of Split in 1780. Mihovil Božić was also able, to some extent, to decipher the inscription in Bosnian script on the Povaljski prag, which was hard to read, in 1788. At his request, as the director of the seminary in Priko, Ivan Nikola Bugardelli from Omiš translated the Bible into Croatian language. Bugardelli created this translation, which is the most fully preserved Croatian Bible translation prior to the 19th century (manuscript kept in the Archives of the Croatian Academy of Sciences and Arts, sign. 1. d. 41), based on the Latin Vulgate text between 1759 and 1768.

== See also ==
- Konstantin Božić (1774 – 1860), Croatian theologian and teacher in the Glagolitic Seminary "Zmajević" (Zadar)
