= Croatian Heraldic and Vexillological Association =

The Croatian Heraldic and Vexillological Association (Croatian: Hrvatsko grboslovno i zastavoslovno društvo), known as CHVA for short, is a non-governmental and non-profit institution which studies Croatian heraldry and vexillology. It was established in 2006.

The association's president is Željko Heimer who runs the Flags and Arms of the Modern Era web site. The CHVA participates in International Congresses of Genealogical and Heraldic Sciences.
