= Dobrivoje Božić =

Serbian inventor (1885–1967)

Dobrivoje Božić Добривоје Божић
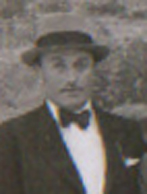
- Born: 23 December 1885; Raška, Kingdom of Serbia
- Died: 13 November 1967 (aged 81); Belgrade, SR Serbia, SFR Yugoslavia
- Occupation(s): Mechanical engineer and inventor
- Family: Bob Bozic (son)

Signature
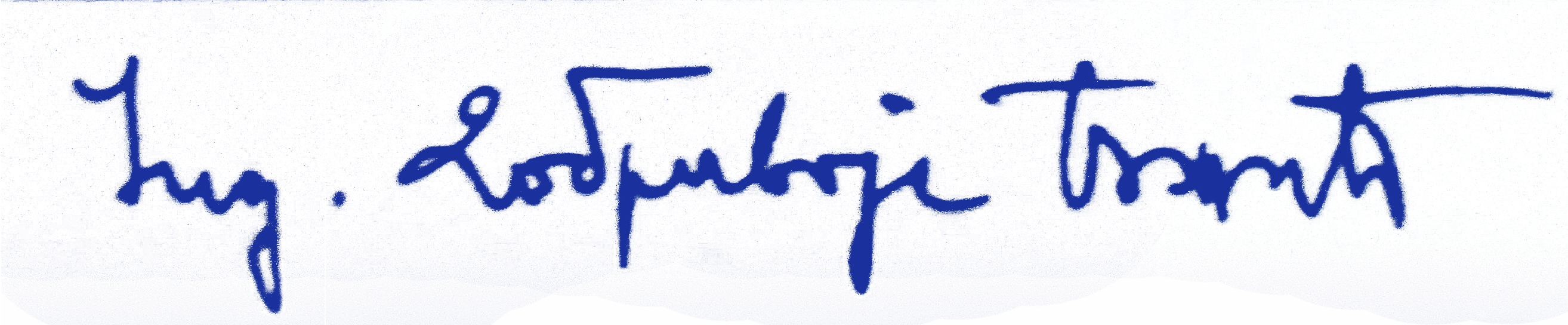

Dobrivoje Božić (Serbian Cyrillic: Добривоје Божић, 23 December 1885 – 13 November 1967) was a Serbian mechanical engineer, inventor and constructor of the first air brakes for trains.

== Early life ==
Dobrivoje Božić was born in Raška in the Kingdom of Serbia. He studied in Germany at the Technical University of Karlsruhe and Dresden. While at Karlsruhe, he was a student of Rudolf Diesel, the inventor of diesel engines. After graduation in 1911, Božić returned to Serbia.

== Career ==
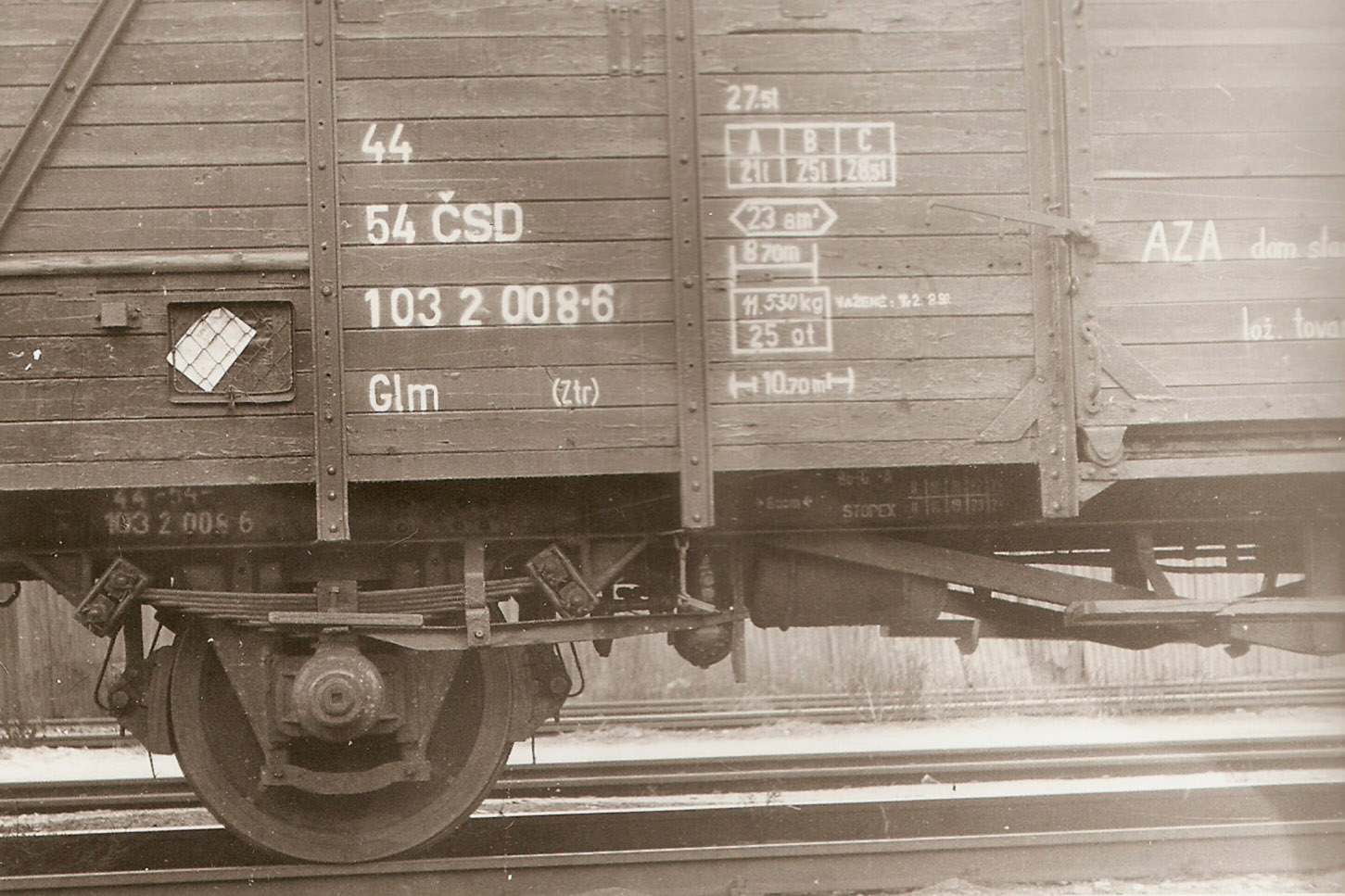
Detail of brake distributor Božič with lever for changing the braking force according to load.

His engineering work began immediately upon his return to the railway workshop in Niš. He simultaneously started his research in the field of railway braking. Božić learned that the brake system that rail vehicles used was one of the most problematic parts of vehicle development, due to trains' increasing speed and mass. In 1869, George Westinghouse designed a brake on compressed air with direct action and improved it in 1872, producing a single-chamber, automatic brake with indirect effects. Božić's research was interrupted during the First World War. After the war, he worked in Kraljevo, Belgrade and Zagreb. He applied to the International Union of Railways for a patent for the Božić brake through the Yugoslav railway in 1925. His patent was approved in 1928. Božić sold his design to the Czech conglomerate Škoda Works and over time, his brake was copied and adapted by most European railways.

Božić's invention resolved then unsolvable problems, such as solutions distributor (main braking device). Three working pressures increased air velocity stab in the main air pipe (along the train) from 80 to 150 metres per second (260 to 490 ft/s). He invented solutions to the problem of gradual release brake, non-exhaustion during braking, an overfull working chamber, load-adaptive braking. He first proposed braking of passenger trains as a function of speed (brakes with two working pressure). He also constructed an efficient brake controller for locomotives.

During World War II, the German occupying forces took over the Božić residence. Dobrivoje reportedly hid from them in a special shelter as they sought his services in order to develop a rocket engine. At the end of the war, Božić was imprisoned; accused of collaboration and assisting in the design of the V-2 rocket. He was released thanks to an intervention from the Soviets who expressed interest in his work and knowledge. Upon his release, he fled with his wife Radmila and son Dragan, and eventually settled in Windsor, Ontario, Canada. Božić's daughter Vesna, died in 1943 at the age of five from complications of appendicitis. Dobrivoje eventually divorced his wife, who gave birth in exile to another son named Robert, and moved to the United States where he lived until 1964 when he returned to Belgrade.
