= Mirko Božić =

Mirko Božić (21 September 1919 – 1 August 1995) was a Croatian writer, respected novelist and playwright of the 20th century, editor of literary publications and weeklies, also involved in politics (vice-president of the Croatian Parliament 1970 - 1974).

== Biography ==
Mirko Božić was born on September 21, 1919, in Sinj, a town situated in the Dalmatian hinterland. He pursued law studies in Belgrade and during World War II he took part in the NOP (National Liberation Movement). After the war he served as the director of the Croatian National Theatre Drama in Zagreb worked as a professional writer and editor for magazines such as "Kulturni radnik", "Literatura", "Književnik", and the weekly "Telegram" He later became the intendant of the Zagreb Croatian National Theatre and held the position of vice president of the Croatian Parliament. His most significant literary work is the Trilogija o Kurlanima. He authored short stories, screenplays for movies, TV dramas and series, as well as radio dramas. He held membership in the Croatian Academy of Sciences and Arts. On August 1, 1995, Mirko Božić passed away in Zagreb.

== Literary works ==
Incomplete bibliography:

- Most (1947), play
- Devet gomolja (1949), play
- Povlačenje (1949), play
- Skretnica (1950), play
- Novele (1953)
- Pravednik (1961), play
- Ljuljačka u tužnoj vrbi (1957), play
- Svilene papuče (1959), play
- Kurlani (1952), novel (first part of the Trilogija o Kurlanima)
- Neisplakani (1955), novel (second part of the Trilogija o Kurlanima)
- Colonnello (1975), novel
- Bomba (1976), novel
- Čovik i po (1974), television series (author of the script)
- Djevojka i hrast i druge priče (1975)
- Tijela i duhovi (1981), novel (third part of the Trilogija o Kurlanima)
- Slavuji i šišmiši (1990.), novel

== Awards ==
- NIN award 1955. for the novel Neisplakani
- Ivan Goran Kovačić Award 1976. for the novel Colonnello
- Vladimir Nazor Award 1985. for Life Achievement

== Legacy ==
- In 2015, a memorial bust of Mirko Božić, created by Ivan Sabolić, was placed in the Croatian National Theatre in Zagreb.
