= Cincar =

Mountain in Bosnia and Herzegovina

- Цинцар
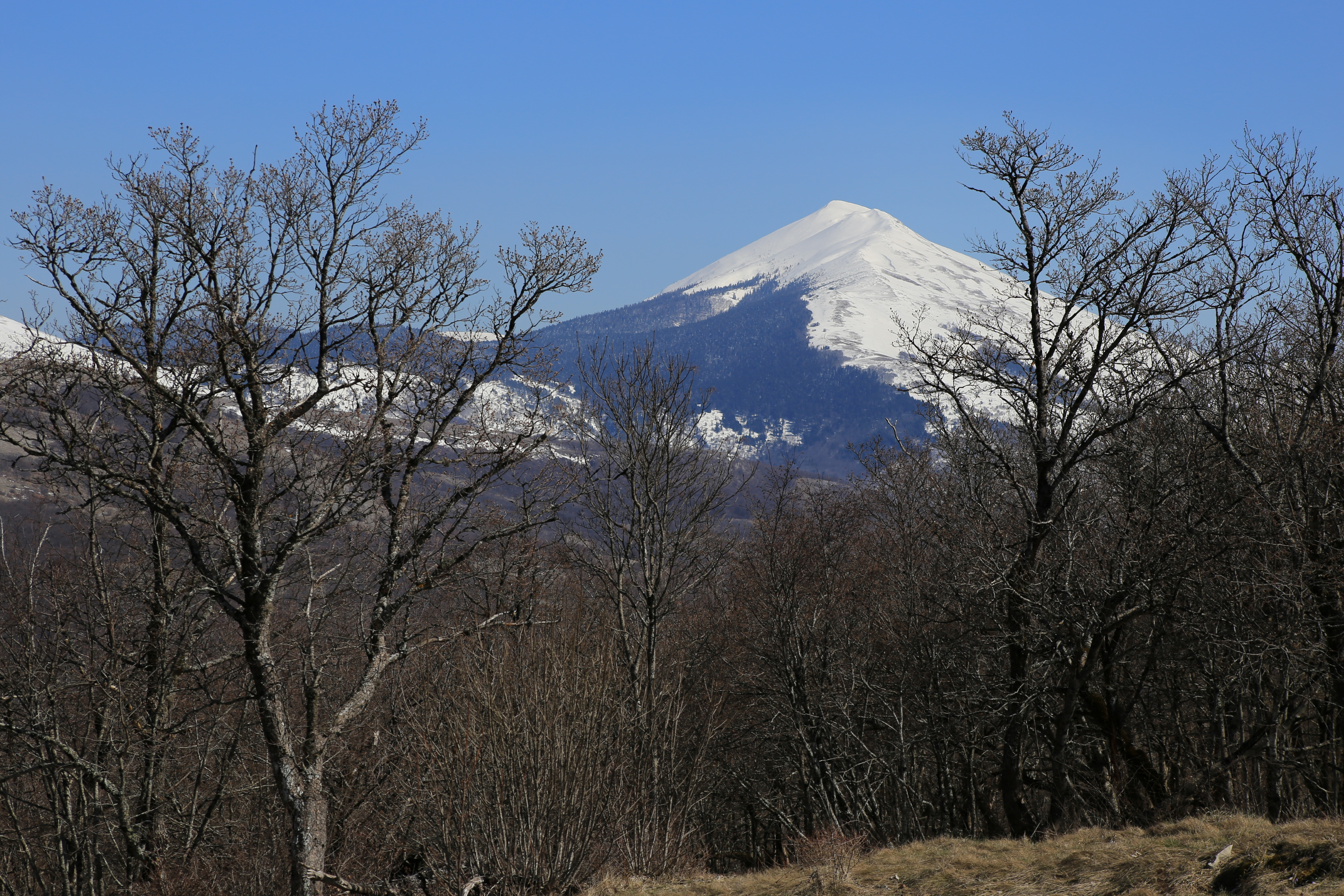
- A view of the Cincar peak from Korićina

Highest point
- Elevation: 2,006 m (6,581 ft)
- Isolation: 42.97 km (26.70 mi) to Mali Vis
- Coordinates: 43°54′08″N 17°03′46″E

Geography
- Location within Bosnia and Herzegovina
- Location: Bosnia and Herzegovina
- Parent range: Dinaric Alps

Cincar (Serbian Cyrillic: Цинцар) is a mountain in the Dinaric Alps of western Bosnia and Herzegovina, located at 43°54′08″N 17°03′46″E between Livno, Kupres and Glamoč. The highest point, the Cincar peak, is at an elevation of 2,006 m (6,581 ft).

== Bibliography ==
- Poljak, Željko (February 1959). "Cincar". Kazalo za "Hrvatski planinar" i "Naše planine" 1898—1958 (PDF). Naše planine (in Croatian). Vol. XI. p. 24. ISSN 0354-0650.
