= Dragan Božić (Serbian politician, born 1969) =

Serbian politician

Dragan Božić (Serbian Cyrillic: Драган Божић; born 1969) is a politician in Serbia. He served in the Assembly of Vojvodina from 2016 to 2020 as a member of the Serbian Progressive Party.

== Private career ==
Božić is a farmer. He lives in the community of Jaša Tomić in Sečanj.

== Politician ==
Božić received the forty-second position on the Progressive Party's Aleksandar Vučić – Serbia Is Winning electoral list in the 2016 Vojvodina provincial election and was elected when the list won a majority victory with sixty-three out of 120 mandates. He served as a government supporter for the next four years and was not a candidate for re-election in 2020.
