= Danica Božić-Bužančić =

Croatian historian and archivist

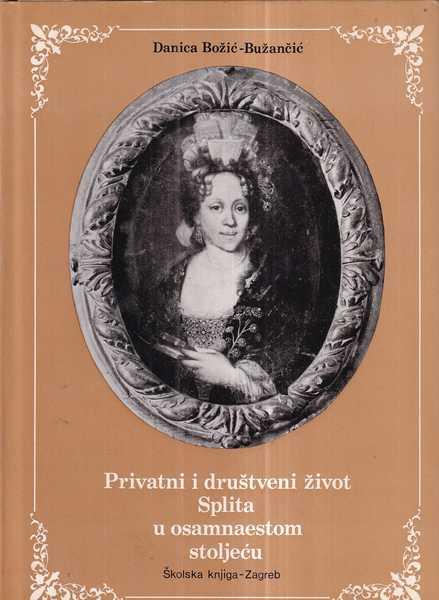
- Book cover "Privatni i društveni život Splita u osamnaestom stoljeću" (published 1995.) by Danica Božić-Bužančić
- Born: 1 November 1922; Split
- Died: 23 September 2002 (aged 79); Split
- Occupations: Historian, archivist

Danica Božić-Bužančić (1 November 1922 – 23 September 2002) was a Croatian historian and archivist, doyenne of the archival profession in Croatia, and an outstanding historian of the 18th century and early modern period.

== Academic work and career ==
Danica Božić-Bužančić was born on 1 November 1922, in Split, where she completed her gymnasium. In 1955, she graduated from the University of Zagreb with a degree in history and archeology. She obtained her doctorate in 1975 in Zadar, and her dissertation thesis focused on private and social life in Split from the end of the 17th century until the collapse of the Venetian Republic.

From 1957 to 1982, she managed the Department for the Arrangement and Processing of Older Materials at the Historical Archives in Split. From 1965 to 1980, she was the deputy director. In 1970, she completed an internship in "stage technique" at the Archives nationales in Paris. Božić-Bužančić retired in 1982 as an archival advisor and became a scientific adviser in 1988. She was also president of the Society of Archival Workers in Split from 1969 until 1980.

Božić-Bužančić was an external collaborator at the Centre for Historical Sciences in Zagreb, the Institute for Scientific and Artistic Work of the Croatian Academy of Sciences and Arts in Split, and the Institute for Medical Sciences of the Croatian Academy of Sciences and Arts in Zagreb. She contributed to the Croatian Biographical Lexicon, founded the journal "Građa i prilozi za povijest Dalmacije", and created various special editions. Božić-Bužančić worked in the editorial office of the "Arhivski vjesnik", was a member of the international society for the study of 18th-century history SJEDS, and was a member of the editorial board of CIM-BAS: Organo d'informazione interna all'Istituto di Ricerca delle Fonti per la Storia della Civilta Marinara Picena.

Božić-Bužančić analyzed the Garagnin family archives and uncovered the significance of the physiocratic movement in Dalmatia. Her primary work, "Južna Hrvatska u europskom fiziokratskom pokretu" (1995), originated from her interest in the issue and is a thorough synthesis. Božić-Bužančić contributed to historical knowledge by editing "Ekonomskopolitička razmišljanja o Dalmaciji" by Ivan Luka Garanjin (1995). She had not completed her study on the plague, but had considered publishing a synthesis on this difficult sickness that ravaged the Dalmatian population. Danica Božić-Bužančić published works from 1958 until her death on September 23, 2002, in Split.

== Historical studies ==
Božić-Bužančić studied historical issues in central Dalmatia, focusing on the 18th century: economic, public, social, cultural, and private lives of citizens, patricians, and nobility; population composition and economic conditions; education; public competitions; epidemics and plague treatment; cultural influences and migrations between the two Adriatic coasts. Her valuable works include studies on interiors of 16th–18th century Split houses (published 1961, 1965, 1967), 16th–18th century jewelry in Split, the summer residences of canon and protonotary Nikola Gaudencio Radovčić in Split, the beginnings of monument protection in Dalmatia (published 1963, 1966, 1970), and the population of Split and Trogir Zagora in the 18th century.

She also authored works on public and family archive inventories (1960, 1969, 1980), as well as the history of archives and archival services. Her publications include periodicals: "Školski vjesnik" (1958), "Arhivist" (1959, 1962), "Prilozi povijesti umjetnosti u Dalmaciji" (1980), "Arhivski vjesnik" (1964/65, 1967, 1970–71, 1973), "Anali Historijskog instituta JAZU u Dubrovniku" (1966), "Kulturna baština" (1972, 1975–76, 1978, 1982–83, 1985), "Prilozi povijesti Hvara" (1978), "Povijest sporta" (1979), and "Mogućnosti" (1979–80).

Božić-Bužančić conducted extensive study and synthesized data primarily written in Italian from historical archives in Split and the Venetian archives. Her research is highly valued by Italian historians since it focuses on contacts between people from both sides of the Adriatic coast.

== Selected works ==
- Inventar Arhiva stare splitske općine. Split 1969.
- Osobni i obiteljski arhivi (u: Priručnik iz arhivistike. Zagreb 1977, 128–139).
- Privatni i društveni život Splita u osamnaestom stoljeću. Zagreb 1982.
- Abbigliamento delle zone di Split dalla fine del XVII al primo decennio del XVIII secolo (u: La Famiglia e la vita quotidiana in Europa dal '400 al ’600. Roma 1986, 503–515).
- Planovi Ivana Petra Marchija za oslobođenje južnih Slavena od Turaka (u zborniku: Ivan Paštrić, 1636–1708. Život, djelo i suvremenici. Split 1988, 121–132).
- Južna Hrvatska u europskom fiziokratskom pokretu. Split 1995.

Published posthumously

- Glad i kuga u Neoriću i okolici tijekom XVIII. stoljeća, 2004.
- Ogledni vrt i perivoj Ivana Luke Garagnina, poslije Fanfogna Garagnin u Trogiru, 2005.

== See also ==
Jerko Božić (1869–1940), Croatian physician, writer and author from Split
