= Coordinator =

Coordinator may refer to:

- Administrative assistant, or sometimes a slightly higher-ranking employee
- Facilitator, a position within an organization or business with significant responsibilities for acting as a liaison between departments, stakeholders and information sources, which requires many non-administrative competencies
- Grammatical conjunction, also called a coordinating conjunction
- An assistant coach in American or Canadian football; see offensive coordinator and defensive coordinator
- Parenting coordinator, a mental health professional assigned by the Court to manage on-going issues in child custody

In fiction:

- Coordinator Sprocket, a fictional character in Viewtiful Joe
- Coordinators, genetically engineered humans in the Gundam SEED series
- A Coordinator or Co-ordinator is the analogue of a presidential title in some of Isaac Asimov's science fiction works, such as "The Evitable Conflict", "In a Good Cause—" and "The Martian Way".
