= Lipa, Livno =

Lipa
- Village
- Location within Bosnia and Herzegovina
- Coordinates: 43°45′08″N 16°53′37″E
- Country: Bosnia and Herzegovina
- Entity: Federation of Bosnia and Herzegovina
- Canton: Canton 10
- Township: Livno

Area
  - Total: 16.47 km^{2} (6.36 sq mi)

Population (2013)
  - Total: 497
  - Density: 30.2/km^{2} (78.2/sq mi)
- Time zone: UTC+1 (CET)
  - Summer (DST): UTC+2 (CEST)

Lipa is a village in the Township of Livno in Canton 10 of the Federation of Bosnia and Herzegovina, an entity of Bosnia and Herzegovina.

== Demographics ==
According to the 2013 census, its population was 497.

Ethnicity in 2013
Ethnicity	Number	Percentage
Croats	495	99.6%
other/undeclared	2	0.4%
Total	497	100%

== Bibliography ==
- Ethnicity/National Affiliation, Religion and Mother Tongue (PDF). Sarajevo: Agency for Statistics of Bosnia and Herzegovina. 2019.
