= Livno =

Livno Ливно
- City
- Grad Livno; City of Livno
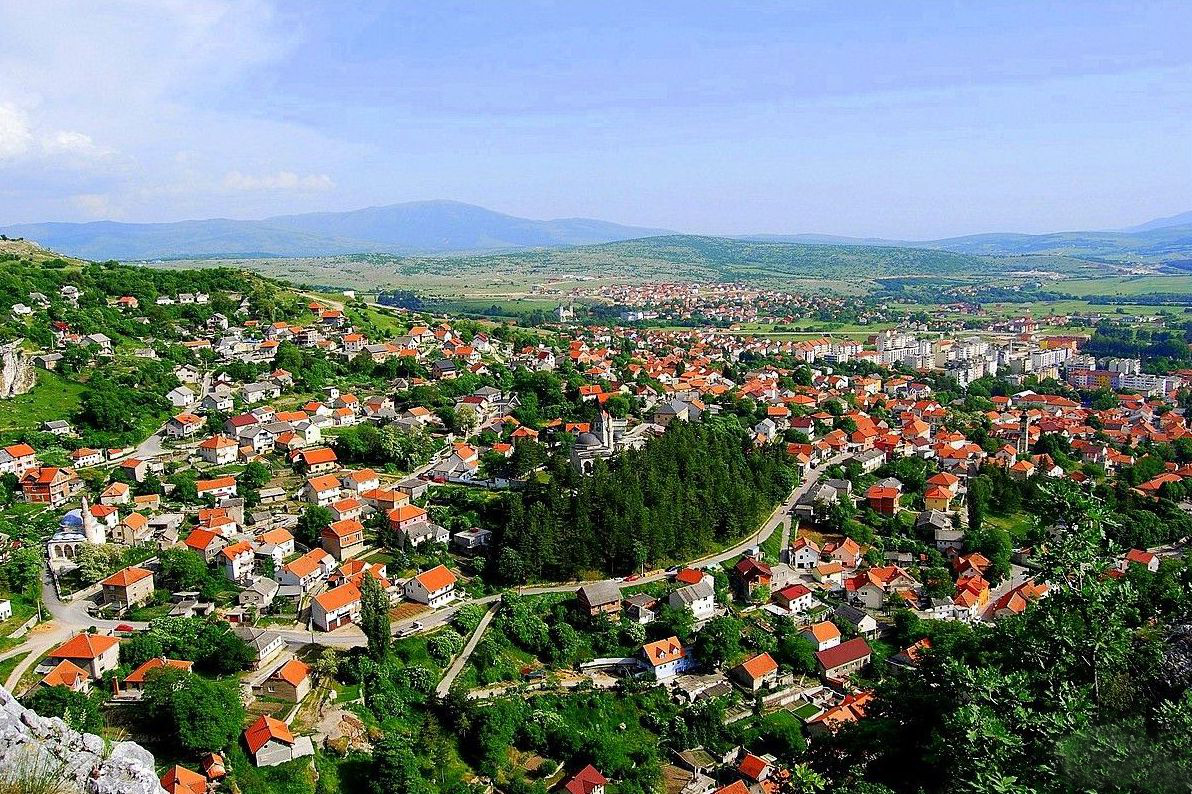
- General view of Livno

- Location within Bosnia and Herzegovina
- Coordinates: 43°49′37″N 17°00′27″E
- Country: Bosnia and Herzegovina
- Entity: Federation of Bosnia and Herzegovina
- Canton: Canton 10
- Township: Livno
- First mentioned: 28 September 892

Government
  - Mayor: Darko Čondrić (HDZ BiH)

Area
  - Total: 29.19 km^{2} (11.27 sq mi)
  - Land: 29.19 km^{2} (11.27 sq mi)
  - Water: 0 km^{2} (0 sq mi)

Population (2013)
  - Total: 7,927
  - Density: 271.6/km^{2} (703.4/sq mi)
- Time zone: UTC+1 (CET)
  - Summer (DST): UTC+2
- Postal code: 80240
- Area code: +387 34

Livno (pronounced [lǐːʋno]) is a town and the administrative center of the Township of Livno and Canton 10 of the Federation of Bosnia and Herzegovina, an entity of Bosnia and Herzegovina. It is situated on the river Bistrica at the southeastern edge of the Livno Field at the foot of Kruzi plateau which is located beneath the Cincar mountain and rocky hill Crvenice. Livno is the centre of the Canton 10 which mainly covers an area of the historical and geographical region of Tropolje. As of 2013, it has a population of 37,487 inhabitants. The town, with its historic ruins and old city from the 9th century, was first mentioned in 892, developing at the crossroads between the Adriatic coast and inland, i.e., regions of Bosnia, Dalmatia, Herzegovina, and Krajina.

== History ==
The plains of Livno have been populated since approximately 2000 BC. In the late Bronze Age, the Neolithic population was replaced by more Indo-European tribes known as the Illyrians. The region was inhabited by the Illyrian tribe of Dalmatae whose capital was Delminium in today's Tomislavgrad. They left remains that testify about their presence in this area. The most important are the gradine, remains of Illyrian settlements distributed along the Livno Field. The three most important are Velika gradina, Mala gradina and Kasalov gradac.

After the Roman conquest of the area, it was part of the province of Dalmatia. During the twenties of the first century AD, the Roman government built a road connecting Salona, a city on the coast with Servitium, a city at the peripanonic lowlands. Its route passed through the Livno Field where two road stations have been established. The station of Pelva was located in the area of the village Lištani and in the area of Livno station Bariduo was based.

Livno celebrates its founding date as 28 September 892 AD, being mentioned in a document from Duke Mutimir which was released at that time. It was the centre of Hlebiana (ή Χλεβίανα) županija (province) of the Kingdom of Croatia, as mentioned in the tenth-century work De Administrando Imperio (chapter 30). From 1199 Emeric until 1326 Mladen II Šubić of Bribir, who was a resident of Livno, it was part of the Chelmensis territory. From 1326 until 1463 Livno was part of the Bosnian Kingdom. One of the noble families of the Bosnian Kingdom bought Livno, Duvno, and Kupres (12th to 13th century) then called "Tropolje," (Three Fields). Cemeteries with large medieval tombstones were found in the area and the anthropological research carried out in 1982 on skeletons from 108 graves with "stećci" type slabs near Livno, indicates a population of autochthonous Vlach origin.

The beginning of the 15th century saw the Ottoman Empire advance, invade, and occupy Bosnia for the next 400 years. The mosque complex in the picture (left) is the Hajji Ahmed the Ducat Minter's Mosque (more commonly known as the Glavica ("Head") Mosque, called after the knap above the town on which it is erected) Constructed upon a design by Mimar Sinan in 1574. (some date to 1587), it is situated on a hill overlooking the old town of Livno, the river Bistrica and the spring Duman in the upper section of the old town of Livno. The mosque complex consists of a compact main building of the mosque under a dome and an uncharacteristically short minaret, with a clock tower which was erected around 1659, and is still in use today. Within the perimeter is an almost 500-year-old necropolis with characteristic early Bosnian Muslim tombstones and later ones.

In 1878, Livno was occupied by Austro-Hungarian forces. Soldiers from Dalmatia and an infantry division from Osijek fiercely fought against 3,000 Ottoman and Muslim militias around Livno, finally capturing the town on September 27. The Congress of Berlin approved of Austro-Hungarian rule in Bosnia and Herzegovina that year.

From 1918 it was part of the Kingdom of Serbs, Croats and Slovenes. In 1929 the kingdom was renamed the Kingdom of Yugoslavia and divided into nine banates (banovine). Livno was divided into the Littoral Banovina, with its centre in the city of Split. This division brought Livno politically closer to Croatia. In 1939, the banates were further redrawn so that there was a Croatian banate (Banovina Hrvatska) of which Livno was also part.

=== WWII ===
From 1941–45, Livno was part of the Axis Independent State of Croatia. The territory that partisans liberated and managed to keep under their control from November 1942 to January 1943 (dubbed the Republic of Bihać) included all of rural Western Herzegovina west of Neretva and Široki Brijeg, including Livno. Livno and its area, under partisan control from August to October 1942, was very important for partisan resistance, as key Croatian Peasant Party members from Livno Florijan Sučić and Ivan Pelivan joined the partisans resistance and mobilized many other Croats.

When the German and Italian Zones of Influence were revised on 24 June 1942, Livno fell in Zone II, administered civilly by Croatia but militarily by Italy.

Croatian writer Ivan Goran Kovačić joined the Partisans in Croata, writing his epic poem "Jama" ("The Pit") during his time with the resistance. He finished it in Livno. When Croatian Ustaše forces drove the partisans out of Livno in October 1942.

After the end of World War II, Livno was a part of Socialist Republic of Bosnia and Herzegovina in Yugoslavia. After its collapse in 1991 and during the Bosnian War, it was under the control of Croat Republic of Herzeg-Bosnia.

=== Recent ===
The Washington Agreement saw to the end of Herzeg-Bosnia, and Livno became a part of the Federation of Bosnia and Herzegovina.

== Location ==
Livno is 96 km from Split, Croatia, and 127 km from Mostar.

== Demographics ==
=== Ethnic composition ===
Ethnic composition - Livno Municipality
	2013.	1991.	1981.	1971.	1961.	1953.	1948.
Total	37,487 (100,0%)	40,600 (100,0%)	40,438 (100,0%)	42,186 (100,0%)	40,291 (100,0%)	38,749 (100,0%)	36,664 (100,0%)
Croats	29,273 (85,76%)	29,324 (72,23%)	28,918 (71,51%)	31,657 (75,04%)	31,133 (77,27%)	30,603 (78,98%)	29,647 (80,86%)
Muslims/Bosniaks	4,138 (12,12%)	5,793 (14,27%)	4,418 (10,93%)	5,087 (12,06%)	2,068 (5,133%)		
Serbs	446 (1,307%)	3,913 (9,638%)	3,898 (9,639%)	4,791 (11,36%)	5,503 (13,66%)	5,204 (13,43%)	4,452 (12,14%)
Unaffiliated	137 (0,401%)						
Others	49 (0,144%)	445 (1,096%)	240 (0,594%)	159 (0,377%)	38 (0,094%)	2,942 (7,59%)	2,565 (7,00%)
Albanians	40 (0,117%)		25 (0,062%)	9 (0,021%)	5 (0,012%)		
Unknown	22 (0,064%)						
Roma	8 (0,023%)		2 (0,005%)				
Montenegrins	6 (0,018%)		41 (0,101%)	33 (0,078%)	44 (0,109%)		
Slovenes	6 (0,018%)		5 (0,012%)	6 (0,014%)	22 (0,055%)		
Macedonians	5 (0,015%)		7 (0,017%)	5 (0,012%)	7 (0,017%)		
Ukrainians	3 (0,009%)						
Yugoslavs		1,125 (2,771%)	2,881 (7,124%)	434 (1,029%)	1,471 (3,651%)		
Hungarians			3 (0,007%)	5 (0,012%)			

Ethnic composition - Livno City
	2013.	1991.	1981.	1971.	1961.
Total	9,045 (100,0%)	10,080 (100,0%)	9,002 (100,0%)	7,207 (100,0%)	5,181 (100,0%)
Croats	4,921 (62,08%)	3,504 (34,76%)	2,890 (32,10%)	2,483 (34,45%)	2,156 (41,61%)
Muslims/Bosniaks	2,679 (33,79%)	3,899 (38,68%)	2,714 (30,15%)	3,075 (42,67%)	885 (17,08%)
Serbs	144 (1,829%)	1,556 (15,44%)	1,206 (13,40%)	1,212 (16,82%)	1,033 (19,94%)
Unaffiliated	101 (1,274%)				
Albanians	40 (0,505%)		24 (0,267%)	9 (0,125%)	5 (0,097%)
Others	30 (0,378%)	175 (1,736%)	40 (0,444%)	72 (0,999%)	16 (0,309%)
Macedonians	3 (0,038%)		4 (0,044%)		6 (0,116%)
Slovenes	3 (0,038%)		3 (0,033%)	1 (0,014%)	17 (0,328%)
Unknown	3 (0,038%)				
Montenegrins	2 (0,025%)		24 (0,267%)	18 (0,250%)	22 (0,425%)
Yugoslavs		946 (9,385%)	2 093 (23,25%)	333 (4,621%)	1,041 (20,09%)
Hungarians			2 (0,022%)	4 (0,056%)	
Roma			2 (0,022%)		

== Geography ==
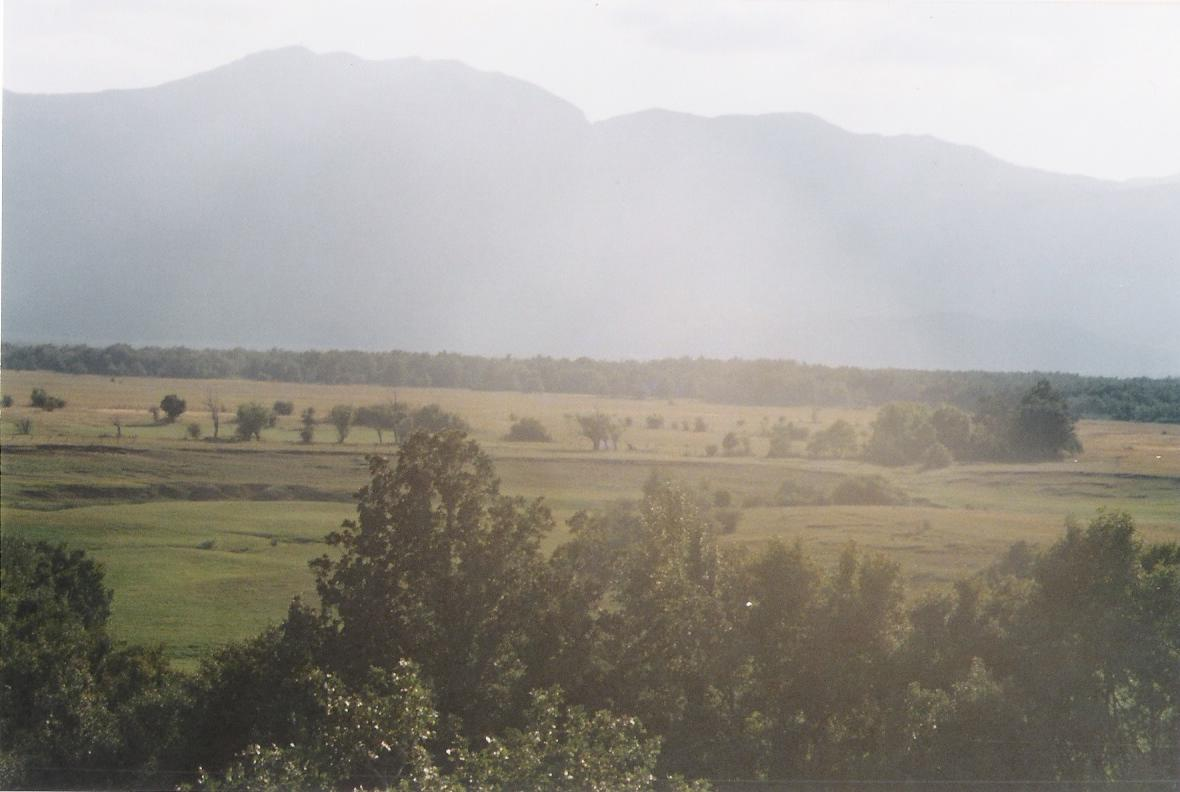
Livno karst field and mount Dinara

The territory of the municipality is 994 km^{2} (384 sq mi). Livno is both the cultural and industrial center of the canton. It is the biggest city in the canton and situated 730 meters above sea level. The Bistrica river flows through the city and is itself is 3 km (1.9 mi) long, which means that it is a very small river. Livno is also situated in the Livanjsko field which is the largest field in the entire country. The field is situated between the mountains Dinara and Kamešnica in the south, Tušnica in the east, Cincar in the north and Šator in the west. Livanjsko field is 405 km^{2} (156 sq mi), making it almost half of the Livno municipality.

== Climate ==
Livno has a stable continental climate with cold winters and warm summers. It is situated between the mountains Cincar and Kamešnica which make the climate more continental than the climate in Mostar and Čapljina for example. The winters in that part of the country are not as cold as in Livno. Climate in this area has mild differences between highs and lows, and there is adequate rainfall year-round. The Köppen Climate Classification subtype for this climate is "Cfb" (Marine West Coast Climate/Oceanic climate).

Climate data for Livno (1961–1990, extremes 1949–present)
Month	Jan	Feb	Mar	Apr	May	Jun	Jul	Aug	Sep	Oct	Nov	Dec	Year
Record high °C (°F)	16.1 (61.0)	20.2 (68.4)	23.2 (73.8)	28.1 (82.6)	30.9 (87.6)	36.8 (98.2)	37.6 (99.7)	38.2 (100.8)	35.0 (95.0)	28.6 (83.5)	25.1 (77.2)	17.1 (62.8)	38.2 (100.8)
Mean daily maximum °C (°F)	4.4 (39.9)	6.0 (42.8)	9.5 (49.1)	13.7 (56.7)	18.9 (66.0)	22.3 (72.1)	25.5 (77.9)	25.5 (77.9)	21.9 (71.4)	16.9 (62.4)	10.6 (51.1)	5.6 (42.1)	15.1 (59.2)
Daily mean °C (°F)	−0.6 (30.9)	0.9 (33.6)	4.1 (39.4)	8.3 (46.9)	13.0 (55.4)	16.1 (61.0)	18.6 (65.5)	17.9 (64.2)	14.2 (57.6)	9.5 (49.1)	4.8 (40.6)	0.6 (33.1)	8.9 (48.0)
Mean daily minimum °C (°F)	−4.8 (23.4)	−3.4 (25.9)	−0.8 (30.6)	2.8 (37.0)	6.5 (43.7)	9.1 (48.4)	10.6 (51.1)	10.2 (50.4)	7.5 (45.5)	3.7 (38.7)	0.1 (32.2)	−3.6 (25.5)	3.2 (37.8)
Record low °C (°F)	−29.6 (−21.3)	−21.0 (−5.8)	−18.9 (−2.0)	−9.0 (15.8)	−3.7 (25.3)	−2.4 (27.7)	0.4 (32.7)	0.6 (33.1)	−4.3 (24.3)	−9.7 (14.5)	−18.2 (−0.8)	−26.4 (−15.5)	−29.6 (−21.3)
Average precipitation mm (inches)	95.4 (3.76)	93.1 (3.67)	96.7 (3.81)	95.2 (3.75)	73.3 (2.89)	91.5 (3.60)	50.5 (1.99)	75.1 (2.96)	85.2 (3.35)	116.0 (4.57)	149.2 (5.87)	125.4 (4.94)	1,146.6 (45.14)
Average precipitation days (≥ 0.1 mm)	12.4	12.0	12.8	13.5	13.4	13.6	8.6	9.2	8.6	10.0	13.0	12.8	139.8
Average snowy days (≥ 1.0 cm)	10.5	8.5	4.2	0.7	0.0	0.0	0.0	0.0	0.0	0.0	3.1	9.8	36.9
Average relative humidity (%)	74.5	71.5	67.7	65.5	65.8	66.7	60.7	63.3	69.9	72.8	74.7	74.8	69.0
Mean monthly sunshine hours	110.0	119.7	153.8	175.1	217.0	240.3	306.8	279.1	222.4	185.4	121.3	100.7	2,231.7
Source: Meteorological Institute of Bosnia and Herzegovina

== Sport ==
Livno is home to many sport clubs, the most famous of which are Troglav 1918 football club, and MNK Seljak futsal club. Basketball is represented by KK Livno and ŽKK Livno. There is also Aerklub Livno.

== Transport ==
M16 road, passing through Kupres and Šujica, connects Livno with Croatia and Central Bosnia. M6.1 starts at Bosansko Grahovo, runs through Livno connecting it with Tomislavgrad, Herzegovina and Mostar. Going northwards M15 connects Livno with Glamoč and northern Bosnia and Herzegovina.

== Notable people ==
- Boris Bandov, footballer
- Hasan Brkić, communist politician and partisan
- Zlatko Dalić, former football player, coach, Croatia national football team coach
- Frank Vlašić, founder of Vlasic Pickles
- Gabrijel Jurkić (1886–1974), painter
- Filip Mihaljević, shot put and discus thrower
- Mate Rimac, entrepreneur, CEO of Rimac Automobili
- Mladen II Šubić of Bribir (c. 1270–c. 1341), Croatian leader and member of the Šubić family
- Almir Velagić, weightlifter, 2008 and 2012 Summer Olympics competitor, multiple European championships medalist (for Germany)
