= List of settlements in the Federation of Bosnia and Herzegovina/Š =

== Ša ==
Šabanci, Šabančići, Šahinovići Kiseljak, Šahmani Donji Vakuf, Šanica, Šantići Vitez (BiH), Šašići, Šatare Donji Vakuf, Šavnik Fojnica

== Šć ==
Šćenica Bobani (municipality Ravno), Šćipe (municipality Prozor-Rama), Šćit (municipality Prozor-Rama)

== Še ==
Šeherdžik Donji Vakuf, Šehovići, Šemihova, Šenkovići Novi Travnik, Šerići Jajce, Šerovina (municipality Prozor-Rama), Šešići Travnik, Ševaš Njive

== Ši ==
Šibenica Jajce, Šići, Šipovača Široki Brijeg, Šipovik Travnik, Šišava Travnik

== Šl ==
Šlimac (municipality Prozor-Rama)

== Šo ==
Šovšići

== Šu ==
Šućurići, Šudine Busovača, Šunji, Šurmanci, Šutkovići Donji Vakuf, Šušljići Bugojno
