= List of settlements in the Federation of Bosnia and Herzegovina/Đ =

List of settlements in the Federation of Bosnia and Herzegovina - Ð
| Settlement | City or municipality | Canton |
|---|---|---|
| Đakovići | Goražde | |
| Đakovići | Čajniče | |
| Đedići | Trebinje | |
| Đedovci | Sokolac | |
| Đedovići | Rogatica | Republika Srpska |
| Đeče | Bileća | |
| Đeđevo | Foča | |
| Đipi | Višegrad | |
| Đulići | Zvornik | |
| Đuličan | Glamoč | |
| Đulovići | Donji Vakuf | |
| Đumezlije | Jajce | |
| Đurevići | Višegrad | |
