= List of settlements in the Federation of Bosnia and Herzegovina/F =

List of settlements in the Federation of Bosnia and Herzegovina - F
Settlement	City or municipality	Canton
Fakići	Donji Vakuf	
Fakovići	Fakovići	
Falanovo Brdo	Konjic	
Faletići	Stari Grad, Sarajevo	
Falešići	Srebrenik	
Fališi	Višegrad	
Faljenovići	Goražde	
Faočići	Goražde	
Fatnica	Bileća	
Ferhatlije	Hadžići	
Ferizovići	Rogatica	Republika Srpska
Filipovići	Loznica	
Fojhar	Srebrenica	
Fojnica	Fojnica	
Fojnica, Fojnica	Fojnica	
Fojnica	Gacko	
Fonjge	Donji Vakuf	
Foča	Foča	
Foča	Doboj	
Furde	Kozarska Dubica	Republika Srpska
