= Dolovi =

Dolovi may refer to:

- Dolovi, Donji Vakuf, Bosnia and Herzegovina
- Dolovi (Konjic), Bosnia and Herzegovina
- Dolovi, Olovo, Bosnia and Herzegovina
- Dolovi (Trebinje), Bosnia and Herzegovina
- Dolovi, Velika Kladuša, Bosnia and Herzegovina
- Dolovi, Visoko, Bosnia and Herzegovina
- Dolovi, Danilovgrad, Montenegro
- Dolovi, Nikšić, Montenegro
