= Brdo =

Brdo (Serbian Cyrillic: Брдо, meaning "hill") may refer to:

== Serbia ==
- Brdo (Nova Varoš), village near Nova Varoš
- Banovo Brdo (Баново Брдо), an urban neighborhood of Belgrade
- Labudovo Brdo (Лабудово брдо), an urban neighborhood of Belgrade
- Julino Brdo (Јулино Брдо), an urban neighborhood of Belgrade
- Pašino Brdo (Пашино Брдо), an urban neighborhood of Belgrade
- Petlovo Brdo (Петлово Брдо or Певац) (also "Pevac"), an urban neighborhood of Belgrade
- Topčidersko Brdo (Топчидерско Брдо), an urban neighborhood and former municipality of Belgrade
- Kanarevo Brdo (Канарево Брдо), an urban neighborhood of Belgrade
- Begovo Brdo (Бегово Брдо), a village in Kruševac, Rasina district
- Vinča-Belo Brdo, an archaeological site in the village of Vinča near Belgrade
- Zeleno Brdo (Зелено брдо), part of Mali Mokri Lug, an urban neighborhood of Belgrade
- Glumčevo Brdo, part of Barajevo, a suburban neighborhood of Belgrade
- A section of Braće Jerković (an urban neighborhood of Belgrade) called Mitrovo Brdo
- Mramorsko Brdo, in Merošina
- Simino Brdo, in Loznica
- Bumbarevo Brdo, in Knić

== Slovenia ==
- Brdo, Domžale, a settlement in the Municipality of Domžale
- Brdo, Ljubljana, a neighborhood of the City Municipality of Ljubljana
- Brdo, Nazarje, a settlement in the Municipality of Nazarje
- Brdo, Nova Gorica, a village in western Slovenia, in the Municipality of Nova Gorica
- Brdo, Šentjur, a settlement in the Municipality of Šentjur
- Brdo, Slovenske Konjice, a settlement in the Municipality of Slovenske Konjice
- Brdo, Tržič, a settlement in the Municipality of Tržič
- Brdo Castle near Kranj (Brdo pri Kranju), an estate and manor in the Municipality of Kranj, in the Upper Carniola region
- Brdo pri Lukovici, a settlement in the Municipality of Lukovica

== Croatia ==
- Brdo, Buje, a settlement in the Municipality of Buje

== Bosnia and Herzegovina ==
- Bivolje Brdo, village in the Čapljina municipality of Herzegovina
- Brdo, Donji Vakuf, a village in Donji Vakuf municipality
- Brdo (Pale), a village in Bosnia and Herzegovina
- Dobro Brdo, a settlement in Bosnia and Herzegovina
- Babića Brdo, a settlement in Bosnia and Herzegovina
- Brdo, Vitez, a village in Vitez municipality

== Other ==
- Novo Brdo (Ново Брдо; Novobërda or Novobërdë, Artana or Artanë), a town and municipality in the Pristina district of Kosovo
- Velje Brdo, a settlement in Podgorica, Montenegro
- Oblo Brdo, a settlement in Montenegro
- Golloborda, or Golo Brdo, a geographical area in southeastern Albania
- Veliko Brdo, Slovenia, a village near Ilirska Bistrica
- Veliko Brdo, Croatia, a village near Makarska
