= Mrđanovci =

Mrđanovci may refer to the following places in Bosnia and Herzegovina :

- Mrđanovci, Kupres, Canton 10
- Mrđanovci, Kupres, Republika Srpska
