= Semin =

Semin may refer to:

== People ==
=== Given name ===
- Semin Öztürk Şener (born 1991), Turkish female professional aerobatic pilot

=== Surname ===
- Alexander Semin (born 1984), Russian professional ice hockey winger
- Dmitri Semin (born 1983), Russian professional ice hockey player
- Yuri Semin (born 1947), Russian football coach
- Alternate spelling of Syomin (name), a Russian surname

== Places ==
- Semin, Donji Vakuf, a village in Bosnia and Herzegovina
- Semín, a village in the Pardubice Region of the Czech Republic
- Semin, Indonesia, a district in Gunung Kidul Regency, Special Region, Yogyakarta, Indonesia
- Semin, Russia, a rural locality (khutor) in Yakovlevsky District, Belgorod Oblast, Russia
