= Rudina =

Rudina may refer to:

== Places ==
- Rudina, Donji Vakuf, Bosnia and Herzegovina
- Rudina, Burgas Province, Bulgaria
- Rudina, Kardzhali Province, Bulgaria
- Rudina, Croatia
- Rudina, a village in Bala Commune, Mehedinţi County, Romania
- Rudina, Kysucké Nové Mesto District, Slovakia

== People ==
- Rudina, feminine form of the Russian surname Rudin
- Ruđina Balšić, Medieval Zetan noblewoman of the Balšić family
- Rudina Hajdari (born 1987), Albanian politician
- Rudina Magjistari (born 1975), Albanian television presenter
- Rudina Pasveer, Dutch figure skater
- Rudina Xhunga (born 1972), Albanian journalist and writer
