= Rastičevo =

Rastičevo may refer to the following places in Bosnia and Herzegovina :

- Rastičevo, Donji Vakuf
- Rastičevo, Kupres, Canton 10
- Rastičevo, Kupres, Republika Srpska
