= Đakovići =

Đakovići may refer to:

- Đakovići (Čajniče), a village in Bosnia and Herzegovina
- Đakovići (Goražde), a village in Bosnia and Herzegovina
