= Šašić =

Šašić is a Bosnian surname. Notable people with the surname include:

- Célia Šašić (née Okoyino da Mbabi; born 1988), German football player
- Milan Šašić (born 1958), Croatian football manager
- Željko Šašić (born 1969), Serbian pop-folk singer

== See also ==
- Szvetiszláv Sasics (1948–2025), Hungarian modern pentathlete
- Šašići, a village in the municipality of Goražde, Bosnia and Herzegovina
