= Hasan Kafi Pruščak =

Bosnian scholar

Personal life
- Born: November/December 1544 Prusac, Sanjak of Bosnia, Ottoman Empire (present-day Bosnia and Herzegovina)
- Died: 9 October 1615 Prusac, Bosnia Eyalet, Ottoman Empire
- Resting place: Tomb beside the madrasa adjoining the mosque he founded in Prusac
- Era: 16th century, 17th century
- Region: Bosnia, Ottoman Empire
- Main interest(s): Islamic jurisprudence, Usul al-fiqh, Islamic theology, Logic, Rhetoric, political thought, biographical literature
- Notable work(s): Uṣūl al-ḥikam fī niẓām al-ʿālam (Basis of Wisdom on the Organization of the World), Nūr al-yaqīn fī uṣūl al-dīn (commentary on al-Ṭaḥāwī's creed epistle)
- Education: Islamic jurisprudence, Usul al-fiqh, Islamic theology, Logic, Rhetoric, Arabic language and literature
- Other names: Hasan Kâfî Akhisârî, Hasan Kafija Pruščak, Hasan al-Bosnevî, Hasan al-Ziʿbî
- Occupation: Qadi and mudarris

Religious life
- Religion: Islam
- Denomination: Sunni
- Jurisprudence: Hanafi
- Creed: Maturidi
- Profession: Islamic scholar, Islamic jurist, Theologian, Philosopher, Historian, Philologist, Poet, Calligrapher

Muslim leader
- Post: Qadi of Prusac, Srem and Osijek
- Influenced by: Abu Hanifa, Abu Mansur al-Maturidi, Kemalpaşazâde, Hacı Efendi Kara Yılan, Molla Ahmed Ensârî

Hasan Kafi Pruščak (November/December 1544 – 9 October 1615) was an Ottoman Bosnian Hanafi scholar, philosopher, historian, writer, poet, Maturidi theologian, philologist and "qadi" (judge) who studied in Bosnia and Istanbul in the Ottoman Empire.

He is considered to be the most significant figure of the area's scientific, cultural and intellectual life in the 16th and early 17th centuries, as well as one of the most important Bosnian thinkers.

== Birth ==
He was born in 1544 in Prusac, studied in Istanbul, and from 1583 he was a judge of Prusac.

== Background ==
Pruščak hailed from the village Prusac near the Bosnian town of Donji Vakuf. He attended elementary school in Prusac before relocating to the Ottoman capital Istanbul where he studied at an Islamic school for nine years. He returned to his hometown in 1575.

He went on the Hajj to Mecca in 1591.

== Works ==
Basis of Wisdom on the Organization of the World is the most significant of his seventeen works. In this work, Pruščak deals with the key issues of the Ottoman Empire at the time and the study was meant to: "help the rulers, guide the viziers, be a role-model for the wise and support for the poor."

Hasan Kafi authored works in Arabic on linguistics, rhetoric, logic, theology, Islamic jurisprudence, biography and political thought. His principal works include:

=== Linguistics and rhetoric ===
- Risāla fī taḥqīq lafẓ Çelebī — a treatise on the etymology and usage of the word Çelebi.
- Temḥīṣ al-Talkhīṣ fī ʿilm al-balāgha — an abridgment of al-Khaṭīb al-Qazwīnī's Talkhīṣ al-Miftāḥ.
- Sharḥ Temḥīṣ al-Talkhīṣ — a commentary on his abridgment of the work on rhetoric.

=== Logic ===
- Mukhtaṣar al-Kāfī min al-manṭiq, also known in some manuscripts as Kāfī fī al-manṭiq.
- Sharḥ Mukhtaṣar al-Kāfī min al-manṭiq — a commentary on the section entitled al-Taṣawwurāt.

=== Theology ===
- Rawḍāt al-jannāt fī uṣūl al-iʿtiqādāt — a work on Islamic creed.
- Azhār al-rawḍāt fī sharḥ Rawḍāt al-jannāt — a commentary on Rawḍāt al-jannāt.
- Nūr al-yaqīn fī uṣūl al-dīn — a commentary on the creed epistle of al-Ṭaḥāwī, written during the siege of Esztergom in 1605 and dedicated to the grand vizier Lala Mehmed Pasha.

=== Islamic jurisprudence ===
- Samt al-wuṣūl ilā ʿilm al-uṣūl — an abridgment of al-Nasafī's Manār al-anwār on the principles of Islamic jurisprudence.
- Sharḥ Samt al-wuṣūl ilā ʿilm al-uṣūl — a commentary on the preceding work.
- Ḥadīqat al-ṣalāt fī sharḥ Mukhtaṣar al-ṣalāt — a commentary on Kemalpaşazâde's Mukhtaṣar al-ṣalāt.
- Risāla fī ḥāshiyat Kitāb al-Daʿwā li-Ṣadr al-Sharīʿa — a marginal commentary on a work concerning litigation and legal claims.
- Sayf al-quḍāt fī al-taʿzīr — a defence of the Ḥanafī school's legal positions against criticism concerning its rulings on illicit sexual intercourse.

=== Biography ===
- Niẓām al-ʿulamāʾ ilā khātam al-anbiyāʾ — a biographical work covering the Prophet Muhammad, prominent Ḥanafī jurists from Abū Ḥanīfa to Hasan Kafi's own teacher Hacı Efendi Kara Yılan, Hasan Kafi himself, and three of his students. Completed around 1599–1600 and dedicated to Damad Ibrahim Pasha.

=== Political thought ===
- Uṣūl al-ḥikam fī niẓām al-ʿālam — his best-known work, a treatise on government and the organization of society. Originally composed in Arabic in 1596, it was subsequently translated and annotated in Turkish by the author. The work discusses justice, consultation, administration, military preparedness, war, and peace.

=== Other works mentioned in the sources ===
- Al-Kāfī — mentioned in the biographical account of his early scholarly career, although its identity and relationship to his other works are not further clarified in the systematic catalogue.
- A commentary on al-Qudūrī's al-Mukhtaṣar — later sources describe a four-volume work, but no manuscript has been identified.
- Risāla fī baʿḍ masāʾil al-fiqh — a work reported by later biographical sources, for which no manuscript has been located.

== See also ==
- Mustafa Ejubović
- Damat Ibrahim Pasha
- Sokollu Mehmed Pasha
- List of Hanafis
- List of Muslim theologians
- List of Maturidis
- List of Bosnia and Herzegovina people
