= Novo Selo, Kupres, Republika Srpska =

Novo Selo Ново Село
- Village
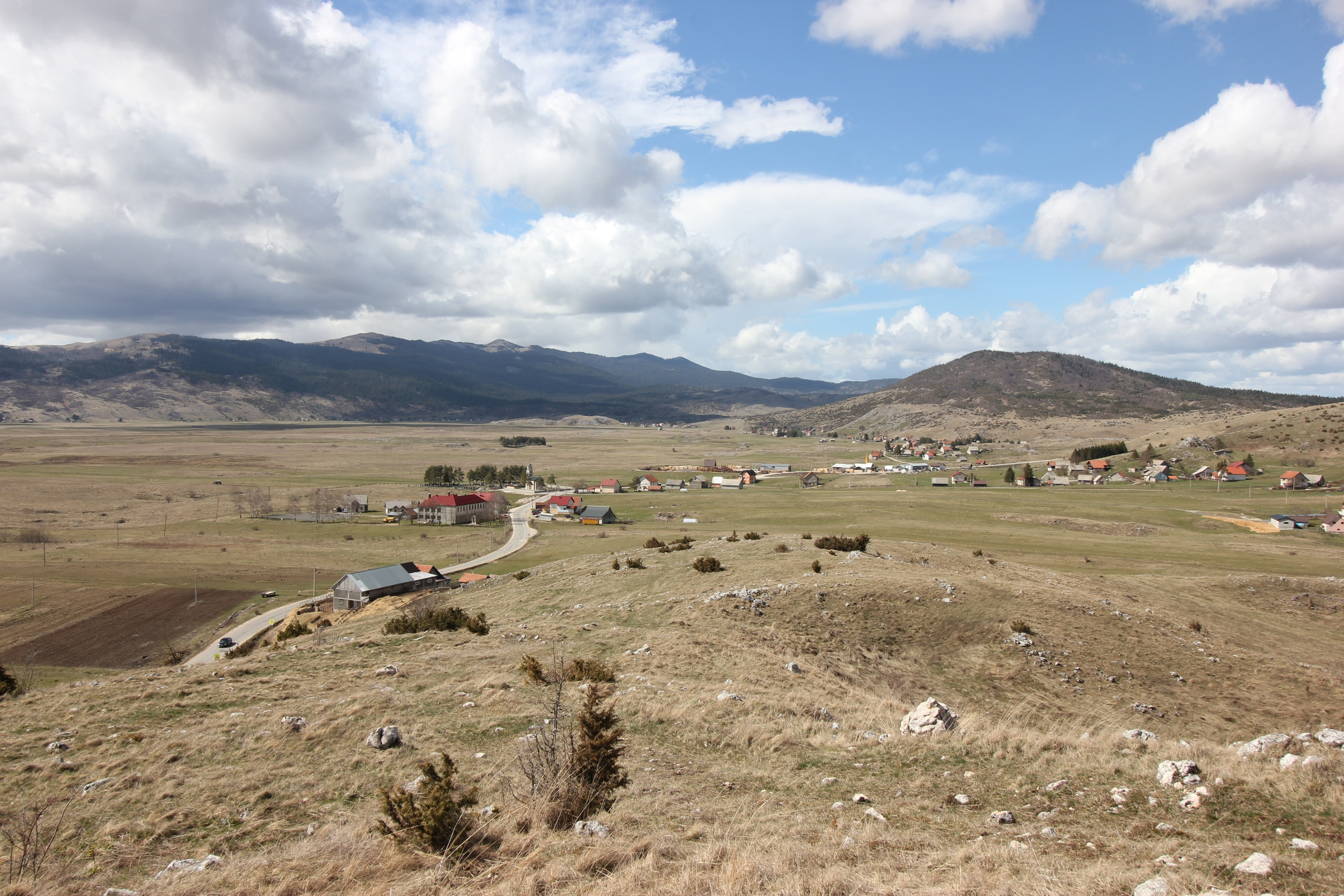

- Location within Bosnia and Herzegovina
- Coordinates: 44°04′49″N 17°08′55″E
- Country: Bosnia and Herzegovina
- Entity: Republika Srpska
- Municipality: Kupres

Area
  - Total: 15.82 km^{2} (6.11 sq mi)

Population (2013)
  - Total: 123
  - Density: 7.77/km^{2} (20.1/sq mi)
- Time zone: UTC+1 (CET)
  - Summer (DST): UTC+2 (CEST)

Novo Selo (Serbian Cyrillic: Ново Село) is a village and the seat of the Municipality of Kupres in Republika Srpska, an entity of Bosnia and Herzegovina. The village's name comes from the Serbo-Croatian, meaning "new village". The southern part of the village was ceded to the Federation of Bosnia and Herzegovina after the Dayton Agreement ended the Bosnian War.

== History ==
The present-day population of Novo Selo descends from the immigrants who settled the village between the end of the 18th century and the Austro-Hungarian occupation in 1878. The immigrants settled from various locations, including Nikšić in present-day Montenegro and the region of Herzegovina, as well as the region of present-day western Bosnia and Herzegovina, such as Unac, Glamoč, Uskoplje and Pribelja and surrounding settlements.

The village was first mentioned by Franciscan Ivan Franjo Jukić in 1851, who described it as an Eastern Orthodox parish in the region of Kupres.

== Demographics ==
According to the 2013 census, its population was 123, all Serbs.
