= Syomin (name) =

Syomin (masculine) or Syomina (feminine), alternatively spelled Semin/Semina, is a Russian surname that is derived from Syoma, a diminutive of the male given name Semyon, and literally means Syoma's. It may refer to:

- Aleksandr Syomin (footballer) (1943–2016), retired Soviet association football player
- Alexander Semin (Aleksandr Syomin; born 1984), professional ice hockey player
- Andrei Syomin (born 1969), Russian association football coach
- Anna Syomina (born 1979), birth name of Yuta (singer), Russian singer and songwriter
- Dmitri Semin (Dmitry Syomin; born 1983), Russian ice hockey player
- Konstantin Syomin (born 1980), Russian journalist and TV anchor
- Oleg Syomin (born 1974), retired Russian association football player
- Tamara Syomina (born 1938), Soviet film actress
- Yuri Semin (Yury Syomin; born 1947), Russian association football coach

== See also ==
- Semin (disambiguation)
