= Prusac =

Prusac Прусац
- Village
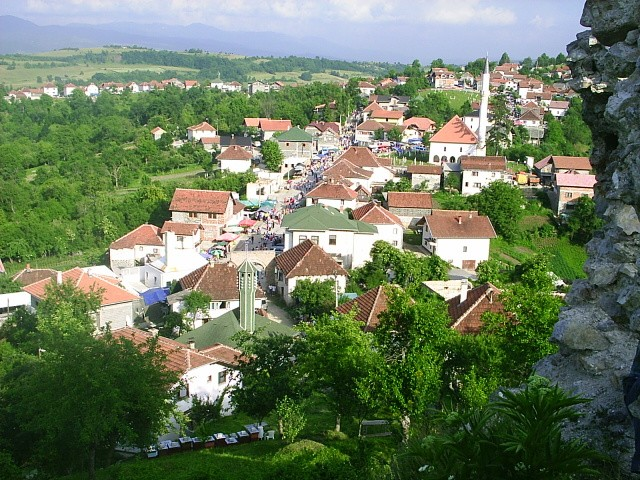
- Prusac village near the town of Donji Vakuf, Bosnia

- Location within Bosnia and Herzegovina
- Coordinates: 44°06′N 17°23′E
- Country: Bosnia and Herzegovina
- Entity: Federation of Bosnia and Herzegovina
- Canton: Central Bosnia
- Municipality: Donji Vakuf

Area
  - Total: 17.45 sq mi (45.20 km^{2})

Population (2013)
  - Total: 1,281
  - Density: 73.40/sq mi (28.34/km^{2})
- Time zone: UTC+1 (CET)
  - Summer (DST): UTC+2 (CEST)

Prusac (Прусац) is a village in Bosnia and Herzegovina in the Central Bosnia Canton of the Federation of Bosnia and Herzegovina. It is one of the oldest villages in the Skopaljska valley located in the upstream area of the Vrbas river. It is located a few kilometres from Donji Vakuf.

Each year, Prusac is the site of the largest Muslim gathering in Europe. Every June thousands of Bosniaks gather at the holy site at Ajvatovica. It was known as "Akhisar" (White Castle in Turkish) during Ottoman rule.

== History ==
The first historical record of Prusac under its present name, was about 1478 in a letter of Skender Pasha to Dubrovnik. In the Middle Ages, Prusac was part of the Uskoplje area, including the fortresses of Susid and Vesela Straža.

=== Biograd ===
The castle of Biograd is located on a rock, overlooking the whole valley of Donji Vakuf. "Bio" means 'white' in the Ikavian accent of Shtokavian dialect, and refers to the white limestone found in this region. The fortress was enclosed with walls thick two and a half meters in some places, featuring loopholes and cannon holes. The strength of Prusac' walls can be measured against the average of medieval cities, which is about one meter. The towers were covered with limestone, carefully mixed with mortar from sifted sand. Next to the guard tower was a round well, which supplied the city with fresh water. The one side of the fortress allowing access features a six meters wide ditch, with a drawbridge leading to the entrance gate.

=== Handanija Mosque ===
The Handanija Mosque is located in the center of Prusac is an exemplary representation of the Bosnia-Herzegovinian Islamic heritage, featuring authentic 17th century architecture. The interior space is a single room with a wooden dome covered by a hipped roof. The building is built of stone, using four types of limestone. The walls are plastered and whitewashed. The bases of the columns are large with subtly decorated round corners. The capital, shaft and base of the columns are carved from one piece of stone. The strong, low proportions of the porch lack the slender elegance of other contemporary mosques. This is an expression of regional classical mosque architecture, and can be found in other mosques, such as in Stolac, Travnik, though the proportions of the Handanija arcade are probably the least slender. The decoration belongs to the period of High Ottoman Classicism (16th-17th century). The structure of the mihrab (niche) is considered to be one of the most beautiful in Bosnia and Herzegovina with carved stone decoration in seven layers of stone. The minaret height was 29,70 m

The Handanija mosque was damaged during the war in 1993. Restoration works conducted by Cultural Heritage without Borders (CHwB) were completed in 2005, when the mosque was re-inaugurated.

== Demographics ==
According to the 2013 census, its population was 1,281.

Ethnicity in 2013
Ethnicity	Number	Percentage
Bosniaks	1,267	98.9%
Serbs	1	0.1%
other/undeclared	13	1.0%
Total	1,281	100%

== Notable people ==
- Hasan Kafi Pruščak, 16th-century scholar
- Naim Hadžiabdić, Grand Mufti of Yugoslavia (1975-1987)
