= Galešići =

- Village
- Location within Bosnia and Herzegovina
- Coordinates: 44°13′N 17°25′E
- Country: Bosnia and Herzegovina
- Entity: Federation of Bosnia and Herzegovina
- Canton: Central Bosnia
- Municipality: Donji Vakuf

Area
  - Total: 0.81 sq mi (2.09 km^{2})

Population (2013)
  - Total: 163
  - Density: 202/sq mi (78.0/km^{2})
- Time zone: UTC+1 (CET)
  - Summer (DST): UTC+2 (CEST)

Galešići is a village in the municipality of Donji Vakuf, Bosnia and Herzegovina.

== Demographics ==
According to the 2013 census, its population was 163, all Bosniaks.
