= Pribraća =

Pribraća Прибраћа
- Village
- Location within Bosnia and Herzegovina
- Country: Bosnia and Herzegovina
- Entity: Federation of Bosnia and Herzegovina
- Canton: Central Bosnia
- Municipality: Donji Vakuf

Area
  - Total: 1.41 sq mi (3.65 km^{2})

Population (2013)
  - Total: 426
  - Density: 302/sq mi (117/km^{2})
- Time zone: UTC+1 (CET)
  - Summer (DST): UTC+2 (CEST)

Pribraća (Cyrillic: Прибраћа) is a village in the municipality of Donji Vakuf, Bosnia and Herzegovina.

== Demographics ==
According to the 2013 census, its population was 426.

Ethnicity in 2013
Ethnicity	Number	Percentage
Bosniaks	403	94.6%
Serbs	14	3.3%
other/undeclared	9	2.1%
Total	426	100%
