= Sultanovići =

- Village
- Location within Bosnia and Herzegovina
- Coordinates: 44°07′27″N 17°27′01″E
- Country: Bosnia and Herzegovina
- Entity: Federation of Bosnia and Herzegovina
- Canton: Central Bosnia
- Municipality: Donji Vakuf

Area
  - Total: 0.95 sq mi (2.47 km^{2})

Population (2013)
  - Total: 70
  - Density: 73/sq mi (28/km^{2})
- Time zone: UTC+1 (CET)
  - Summer (DST): UTC+2 (CEST)

Sultanovići is a village in the municipality of Donji Vakuf, Bosnia and Herzegovina.

== Demographics ==
According to the 2013 census, its population was 70.

Ethnicity in 2013
Ethnicity	Number	Percentage
Bosniaks	65	92.9%
other/undeclared	5	7.1%
Total	70	100%
