= Piljužići, Donji Vakuf =

Piljužići
- Village
- Location within Bosnia and Herzegovina
- Coordinates: 44°13′N 17°25′E
- Country: Bosnia and Herzegovina
- Entity: Federation of Bosnia and Herzegovina
- Canton: Central Bosnia
- Municipality: Donji Vakuf

Area
  - Total: 0.46 sq mi (1.19 km^{2})

Population (2013)
  - Total: 163
  - Density: 355/sq mi (137/km^{2})
- Time zone: UTC+1 (CET)
  - Summer (DST): UTC+2 (CEST)

Piljužići is a village in the municipality of Donji Vakuf, Bosnia and Herzegovina.

== Demographics ==
According to the 2013 census, its population was 163.

Ethnicity in 2013
Ethnicity	Number	Percentage
Bosniaks	157	96.3%
other/undeclared	6	3.97%
Total	163	100%
