= Košćani =

- Village
- Location within Bosnia and Herzegovina
- Country: Bosnia and Herzegovina
- Entity: Federation of Bosnia and Herzegovina
- Canton: Central Bosnia
- Municipality: Donji Vakuf

Area
  - Total: 6.13 sq mi (15.88 km^{2})

Population (2013)
  - Total: 19
  - Density: 3.1/sq mi (1.2/km^{2})
- Time zone: UTC+1 (CET)
  - Summer (DST): UTC+2 (CEST)

Košćani is a village in the municipality of Donji Vakuf, Bosnia and Herzegovina.

== Demographics ==
According to the 2013 census, its population was 19.

Ethnicity in 2013
Ethnicity	Number	Percentage
Bosniaks	18	94.7%
other/undeclared	1	5.3%
Total	19	100%
