= Staro Selo, Donji Vakuf =

Staro Selo
- Village
- Location within Bosnia and Herzegovina
- Country: Bosnia and Herzegovina
- Entity: Federation of Bosnia and Herzegovina
- Canton: Central Bosnia
- Municipality: Donji Vakuf

Area
  - Total: 2.07 sq mi (5.36 km^{2})

Population (2013)
  - Total: 77
  - Density: 37/sq mi (14/km^{2})
- Time zone: UTC+1 (CET)
  - Summer (DST): UTC+2 (CEST)

Staro Selo is a village in the municipality of Donji Vakuf, Bosnia and Herzegovina.

== Demographics ==
According to the 2013 census, its population was 77.

Ethnicity in 2013
Ethnicity	Number	Percentage
Bosniaks	76	98.7%
other/undeclared	1	1.3%
Total	77	100%
