= Potkraj, Donji Vakuf =

Potkraj
- Village
- Location within Bosnia and Herzegovina
- Country: Bosnia and Herzegovina
- Entity: Federation of Bosnia and Herzegovina
- Canton: Central Bosnia
- Municipality: Donji Vakuf

Area
  - Total: 0.39 sq mi (1.00 km^{2})

Population (2013)
  - Total: 58
  - Density: 150/sq mi (58/km^{2})
- Time zone: UTC+1 (CET)
  - Summer (DST): UTC+2 (CEST)

Potkraj is a village in the municipality of Donji Vakuf, Bosnia and Herzegovina.

== Demographics ==
According to the 2013 census, its population was 58.

At the end is a village in the municipality of Donji Vakuf, FBiH, BiH. It is located south of Donji Vakuf, near Prusac.

Ethnicity in 2013
Ethnicity	Number	Percentage
Bosniaks	41	70.7%
Croats	14	24.1%
other/undeclared	3	5.2%
Total	58	100%
