= Daljan =

Daljan Даљан
- Village
- Location within Bosnia and Herzegovina
- Coordinates: 44°08′N 17°24′E
- Country: Bosnia and Herzegovina
- Entity: Federation of Bosnia and Herzegovina
- Canton: Central Bosnia
- Municipality: Donji Vakuf

Area
  - Total: 0.31 sq mi (0.80 km^{2})

Population (2013)
  - Total: 236
  - Density: 760/sq mi (300/km^{2})
- Time zone: UTC+1 (CET)
  - Summer (DST): UTC+2 (CEST)

Daljan (Cyrillic: Даљан) is a village in the municipality of Donji Vakuf, Bosnia and Herzegovina.

== Demographics ==
According to the 2013 census, its population was 236.

Ethnicity in 2013
Ethnicity	Number	Percentage
Bosniaks	234	99.2%
Serbs	2	0.8%
Total	236	100%
