= Guvna =

- Village
- Location within Bosnia and Herzegovina
- Coordinates: 44°05′10″N 17°23′46″E
- Country: Bosnia and Herzegovina
- Entity: Federation of Bosnia and Herzegovina
- Canton: Central Bosnia
- Municipality: Donji Vakuf

Area
  - Total: 1.02 sq mi (2.65 km^{2})

Population (2013)
  - Total: 172
  - Density: 168/sq mi (64.9/km^{2})
- Time zone: UTC+1 (CET)
  - Summer (DST): UTC+2 (CEST)

Guvna is a village in the municipality of Donji Vakuf, Bosnia and Herzegovina.

== Demographics ==
According to the 2013 census, its population was 172.

Ethnicity in 2013
| Ethnicity | Number | Percentage |
|---|---|---|
| Bosniaks | 145 | 84.3% |
| Croats | 9 | 5.2% |
| other/undeclared | 18 | 10.5% |
| Total | 172 | 100% |
