= Brda, Donji Vakuf =

Brda
- Village
- Location within Bosnia and Herzegovina
- Coordinates: 44°13′21″N 17°21′11″E
- Country: Bosnia and Herzegovina
- Entity: Federation of Bosnia and Herzegovina
- Canton: Central Bosnia
- Municipality: Donji Vakuf

Area
  - Total: 3.76 sq mi (9.73 km^{2})

Population (2013)
  - Total: 2
  - Density: 0.53/sq mi (0.21/km^{2})
- Time zone: UTC+1 (CET)
  - Summer (DST): UTC+2 (CEST)

Brda is a village in the municipality of Donji Vakuf, Bosnia and Herzegovina.

== Demographics ==
According to the 2013 census, its population was 2, both Bosniaks.
