= Hemići =

Hemići Хемићи
- Village
- Location within Bosnia and Herzegovina
- Coordinates: 44°13′N 17°25′E
- Country: Bosnia and Herzegovina
- Entity: Federation of Bosnia and Herzegovina
- Canton: Central Bosnia
- Municipality: Donji Vakuf

Area
  - Total: 1.73 sq mi (4.49 km^{2})

Population (2013)
  - Total: 136
  - Density: 78.4/sq mi (30.3/km^{2})
- Time zone: UTC+1 (CET)
  - Summer (DST): UTC+2 (CEST)

Hemići (Cyrillic: Хемићи) is a village in the municipality of Donji Vakuf, Bosnia and Herzegovina.

== Demographics ==
According to the 2013 census, its population was 103.

Ethnicity in 2013
| Ethnicity | Number | Percentage |
|---|---|---|
| Bosniaks | 135 | 99.3% |
| other/undeclared | 1 | 0.7% |
| Total | 136 | 100% |
