= Grabantići =

Grabantići Грабантићи
- Village
- Location within Bosnia and Herzegovina
- Coordinates: 44°13′N 17°26′E
- Country: Bosnia and Herzegovina
- Entity: Federation of Bosnia and Herzegovina
- Canton: Central Bosnia
- Municipality: Donji Vakuf

Area
  - Total: 0.45 sq mi (1.16 km^{2})

Population (2013)
  - Total: 26
  - Density: 58/sq mi (22/km^{2})
- Time zone: UTC+1 (CET)
  - Summer (DST): UTC+2 (CEST)

Grabantići (Cyrillic: Грабантићи) is a village in the municipality of Donji Vakuf, Bosnia and Herzegovina.

== Demographics ==
According to the 2013 census, its population was 26, all Bosniaks.
