= Ćehajići, Donji Vakuf =

Ćehajići
- Village
- Location within Bosnia and Herzegovina
- Coordinates: 44°07′31″N 17°25′39″E
- Country: Bosnia and Herzegovina
- Entity: Federation of Bosnia and Herzegovina
- Canton: Central Bosnia
- Municipality: Donji Vakuf

Area
  - Total: 0.54 sq mi (1.39 km^{2})

Population (2013)
  - Total: 311
  - Density: 579/sq mi (224/km^{2})
- Time zone: UTC+1 (CET)
  - Summer (DST): UTC+2 (CEST)

Ćehajići is a village in the municipality of Donji Vakuf, Bosnia and Herzegovina.

== Demographics ==
According to the 2013 census, its population was 311.

Ethnicity in 2013
Ethnicity	Number	Percentage
Bosniaks	297	95.5%
other/undeclared	14	4.5%
Total	311	100%
