= Babino Selo =

Babino Selo Бабино Село
- Village
- Location within Bosnia and Herzegovina
- Coordinates: 44°13′N 17°21′E
- Country: Bosnia and Herzegovina
- Entity: Federation of Bosnia and Herzegovina
- Canton: Central Bosnia
- Municipality: Donji Vakuf

Area
  - Total: 1.39 sq mi (3.59 km^{2})
- Elevation: 910 ft (280 m)

Population (2013)
  - Total: 0
  - Density: 0.0/sq mi (0.0/km^{2})
- Time zone: UTC+1 (CET)
  - Summer (DST): UTC+2 (CEST)

Babino Selo (Serbian Cyrillic: Бабино Село) is a village in the municipality of Donji Vakuf, Bosnia and Herzegovina.

== Demographics ==
According to the 2013 census, its population was 0, down from 67 in 1991.
