= Makitani =

Makitani Макитани
- Village
- Location within Bosnia and Herzegovina
- Coordinates: 44°12′N 17°24′E
- Country: Bosnia and Herzegovina
- Entity: Federation of Bosnia and Herzegovina
- Canton: Central Bosnia
- Municipality: Donji Vakuf

Area
  - Total: 0.52 sq mi (1.35 km^{2})

Population (2013)
  - Total: 20
  - Density: 38/sq mi (15/km^{2})
- Time zone: UTC+1 (CET)
  - Summer (DST): UTC+2 (CEST)

Makitani (Cyrillic: Макитани) is a village in the municipality of Donji Vakuf, Bosnia and Herzegovina.

== Demographics ==
According to the 2013 census, its population was 20, all Bosniaks.
