= Suhodol, Donji Vakuf =

Suhodol
- Village
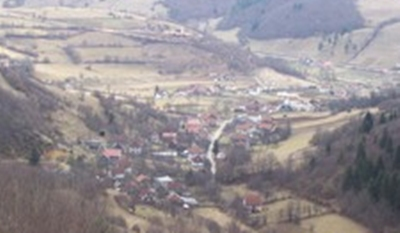

- Location within Bosnia and Herzegovina
- Coordinates: 44°12′N 17°25′E
- Country: Bosnia and Herzegovina
- Entity: Federation of Bosnia and Herzegovina
- Canton: Central Bosnia
- Municipality: Donji Vakuf

Area
  - Total: 1.14 sq mi (2.94 km^{2})

Population (2013)
  - Total: 182
  - Density: 160/sq mi (61.9/km^{2})
- Time zone: UTC+1 (CET)
  - Summer (DST): UTC+2 (CEST)

Suhodol is a village in the municipality of Donji Vakuf, Bosnia and Herzegovina.

== Demographics ==
According to the 2013 census, its population was 182.

Ethnicity in 2013
Ethnicity	Number	Percentage
Bosniaks	181	99.5%
other/undeclared	1	0.5%
Total	182	100%
