= Komar, Donji Vakuf =

Komar
- Village
- Location within Bosnia and Herzegovina
- Coordinates: 44°12′10″N 17°29′28″E
- Country: Bosnia and Herzegovina
- Entity: Federation of Bosnia and Herzegovina
- Canton: Central Bosnia
- Municipality: Donji Vakuf

Area
  - Total: 1.75 sq mi (4.52 km^{2})

Population (2013)
  - Total: 88
  - Density: 50/sq mi (19/km^{2})
- Time zone: UTC+1 (CET)
  - Summer (DST): UTC+2 (CEST)

Komar is a village in the municipality of Donji Vakuf, Bosnia and Herzegovina.

== Demographics ==
According to the 2013 census, its population was 88.

Ethnicity in 2013
Ethnicity	Number	Percentage
Bosniaks	70	79.5%
Serbs	2	2.3%
other/undeclared	16	18.2%
Total	88	100%
