= Kovačevići, Donji Vakuf =

Kovačevići
- Village
- Location within Bosnia and Herzegovina
- Coordinates: 44°11′47″N 17°26′49″E
- Country: Bosnia and Herzegovina
- Entity: Federation of Bosnia and Herzegovina
- Canton: Central Bosnia
- Municipality: Donji Vakuf

Area
  - Total: 0.84 sq mi (2.17 km^{2})

Population (2013)
  - Total: 0
  - Density: 0.0/sq mi (0.0/km^{2})
- Time zone: UTC+1 (CET)
  - Summer (DST): UTC+2 (CEST)

Kovačevići (Serbian Cyrillic: Ковачевићи) is a village in the municipality of Donji Vakuf, Bosnia and Herzegovina.

== Demographics ==
According to the 2013 census, its population was nil, down from 61 in 1991.
