= Sokolina, Donji Vakuf =

Sokolina
- Village
- Location within Bosnia and Herzegovina
- Coordinates: 44.2468249°N 17.3493291°E
- Country: Bosnia and Herzegovina
- Entity: Federation of Bosnia and Herzegovina
- Canton: Central Bosnia
- Municipality: Donji Vakuf

Area
  - Total: 3.19 sq mi (8.26 km^{2})

Population (2013)
  - Total: 135
  - Density: 42.3/sq mi (16.3/km^{2})
- Time zone: UTC+1 (CET)
  - Summer (DST): UTC+2 (CEST)

Sokolina is a village in the municipality of Donji Vakuf, Bosnia and Herzegovina.

== Demographics ==
According to the 2013 census, its population was 135.

Ethnicity in 2013
Ethnicity	Number	Percentage
Bosniaks	133	98.5%
other/undeclared	2	1.5%
Total	135	100%
