= Karići, Donji Vakuf =

Karići
- Village
- Location within Bosnia and Herzegovina
- Country: Bosnia and Herzegovina
- Entity: Federation of Bosnia and Herzegovina
- Canton: Central Bosnia
- Municipality: Donji Vakuf

Area
  - Total: 0.30 sq mi (0.77 km^{2})

Population (2013)
  - Total: 45
  - Density: 150/sq mi (58/km^{2})
- Time zone: UTC+1 (CET)
  - Summer (DST): UTC+2 (CEST)

Karići is a village in the municipality of Donji Vakuf, Bosnia and Herzegovina.

== Demographics ==
According to the 2013 census, its population was 45.

Ethnicity in 2013
Ethnicity	Number	Percentage
Bosniaks	30	66.7%
other/undeclared	15	33.3%
Total	45	100%
