= Torlakovac =

- Village
- Location within Bosnia and Herzegovina
- Coordinates: 44°14′N 17°19′E
- Country: Bosnia and Herzegovina
- Entity: Federation of Bosnia and Herzegovina
- Canton: Central Bosnia
- Municipality: Donji Vakuf

Area
  - Total: 2.69 sq mi (6.98 km^{2})

Population (2013)
  - Total: 592
  - Density: 220/sq mi (84.8/km^{2})
- Time zone: UTC+1 (CET)
  - Summer (DST): UTC+2 (CEST)

Torlakovac is a village in the municipality of Donji Vakuf, Bosnia and Herzegovina.

== Demographics ==
According to the 2013 census, its population was 592.

Ethnicity in 2013
Ethnicity	Number	Percentage
Bosniaks	590	99.7%
Croats	1	0.2%
other/undeclared	1	0.2%
Total	592	100%
