= Grič, Donji Vakuf =

Grič
- Village
- Location within Bosnia and Herzegovina
- Coordinates: 44.2123017°N 17.4037657°E
- Country: Bosnia and Herzegovina
- Entity: Federation of Bosnia and Herzegovina
- Canton: Central Bosnia
- Municipality: Donji Vakuf

Area
  - Total: 0.29 sq mi (0.75 km^{2})

Population (2013)
  - Total: 25
  - Density: 86/sq mi (33/km^{2})
- Time zone: UTC+1 (CET)
  - Summer (DST): UTC+2 (CEST)

Grič is a village in the municipality of Donji Vakuf, Bosnia and Herzegovina.

== Demographics ==
According to the 2013 census, its population was 25, all Bosniaks.
