= Municipality of Kupres, Republika Srpska =

Municipality in Bosnia and Herzegovina

Kupres Купрес
- Municipality
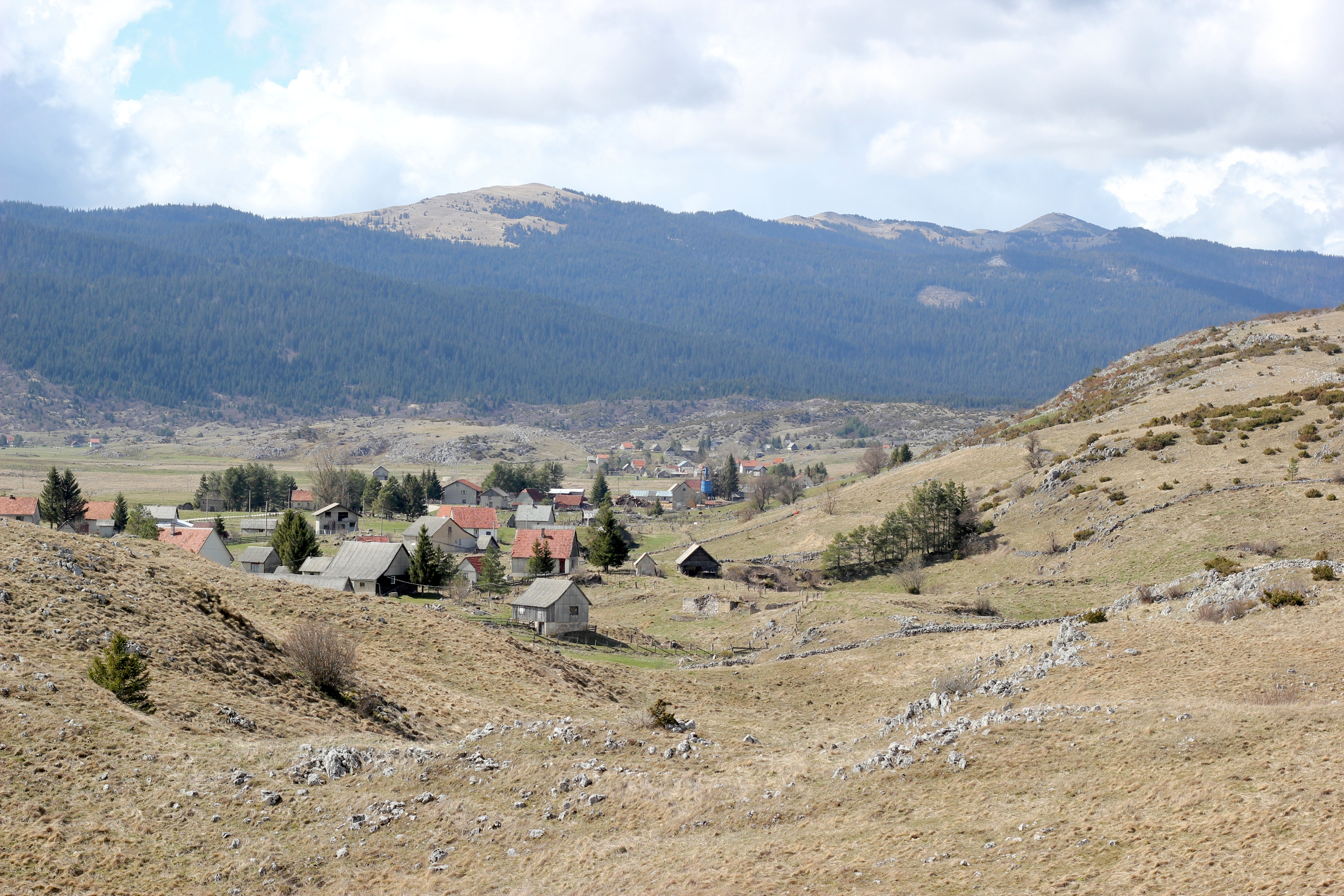

- Location of Kupres (Republika Srpska) within Bosnia and Herzegovina

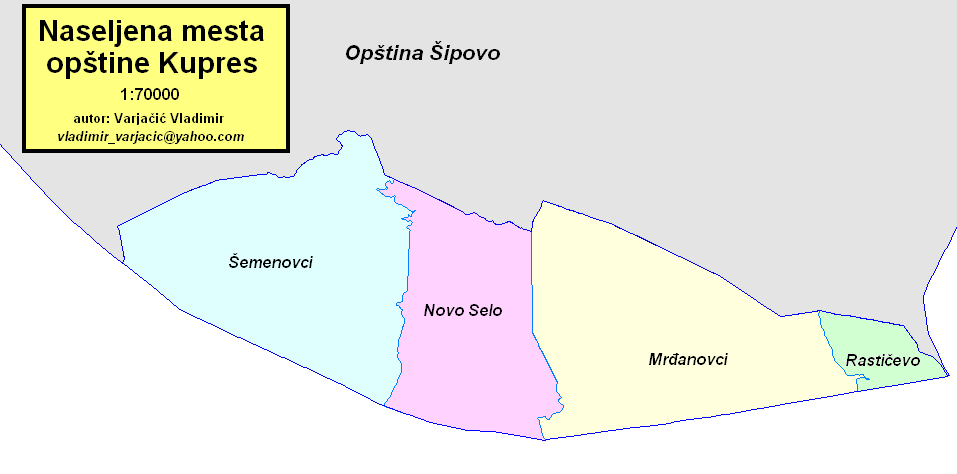
- Coordinates: 44.0833°N 17.2167°E
- Country: Bosnia and Herzegovina
- Entity: Republika Srpska

Government
  - Municipal mayor: Srđen Petković (SP)

Area
  - Total: 47.8 km^{2} (18.5 sq mi)

Population (2013 census)
  - Total: 300
  - Density: 6.3/km^{2} (16/sq mi)
- Time zone: UTC+1 (CET)
  - Summer (DST): UTC+2 (CEST)
- Area code: 50

Kupres (Serbian Cyrillic: Купрес), unofficially known as the Serb Kupres (Српски Купрес), is a municipality in Republika Srpska, Bosnia and Herzegovina. It borders the region of Bosanska Krajina to the north. It is one of the most undeveloped and poorest municipalities in Bosnia and Herzegovina. The seat of the municipality is the village of Novo Selo.

== History ==
The municipality was formed after the creation of the two entities, Federation of Bosnia and Herzegovina and Republika Srpska, which together comprise the sovereign state of Bosnia and Herzegovina. The creation of the two entities split the original municipality of Kupres in two, one municipality in Federation of Bosnia and Herzegovina and the other in Republika Srpska. During the war, the municipality's name was changed to Srpski Kupres (Српски Купрес), but since then the Government of Bosnia and Herzegovina has forbidden its use to avoid nationalist sentiment.

As of 2019, it is one of the smallest municipalities by number of inhabitants in Republika Srpska.

== Settlements ==
- Mrđanovci
- Novo Selo
- Šemenovci
- Rastičevo

== Demographics ==
=== Population ===
Population of settlements – Kupres (RS) municipality
	Settlement	1991.	2013.
	Total		300
1	Kupres (RS)	792	293

=== Ethnic composition ===
Ethnic composition – Kupres (RS) municipality
	2013.
Total	300 (100,0%)
Serbs	299 (99,67%)
Others	1 (0,333%)

== See also ==
- Municipalities of Republika Srpska
