= Donji Rasavci =

- Village
- Location within Bosnia and Herzegovina
- Coordinates: 44°10′22″N 17°20′07″E
- Country: Bosnia and Herzegovina
- Entity: Federation of Bosnia and Herzegovina
- Canton: Central Bosnia
- Municipality: Donji Vakuf

Area
  - Total: 0.54 sq mi (1.40 km^{2})

Population (2013)
  - Total: 204
  - Density: 377/sq mi (146/km^{2})
- Time zone: UTC+1 (CET)
  - Summer (DST): UTC+2 (CEST)

Donji Rasavci is a village in the municipality of Donji Vakuf, Bosnia and Herzegovina.

== Demographics ==
According to the 2013 census, its population was 204.

Ethnicity in 2013
Ethnicity	Number	Percentage
Bosniaks	198	97.1%
other/undeclared	6	2.9%
Total	204	100%
