= Šatare =

- Village
- Location within Bosnia and Herzegovina
- Coordinates: 44°13′N 17°27′E
- Country: Bosnia and Herzegovina
- Entity: Federation of Bosnia and Herzegovina
- Municipality: Donji Vakuf
- Time zone: UTC+1 (CET)
  - Summer (DST): UTC+2 (CEST)

Šatare is a village in the municipality of Donji Vakuf, Bosnia and Herzegovina.
