= Sandžak, Donji Vakuf =

Sandžak
- Village
- Location within Bosnia and Herzegovina
- Coordinates: 44.197888°N 17.3526778°E
- Country: Bosnia and Herzegovina
- Entity: Federation of Bosnia and Herzegovina
- Canton: Central Bosnia
- Municipality: Donji Vakuf

Area
  - Total: 1.60 sq mi (4.14 km^{2})

Population (2013)
  - Total: 33
  - Density: 21/sq mi (8.0/km^{2})
- Time zone: UTC+1 (CET)
  - Summer (DST): UTC+2 (CEST)

Sandžak is a village in the municipality of Donji Vakuf, Bosnia and Herzegovina.

== Demographics ==
According to the 2013 census, its population was 33.

Ethnicity in 2013
Ethnicity	Number	Percentage
Bosniaks	30	90.9%
other/undeclared	3	9.1%
Total	33	100%
