= Blagaj, Donji Vakuf =

Blagaj
- Village
- Location within Bosnia and Herzegovina
- Coordinates: 44°09′51″N 17°25′32″E
- Country: Bosnia and Herzegovina
- Entity: Federation of Bosnia and Herzegovina
- Canton: Central Bosnia
- Municipality: Donji Vakuf

Area
  - Total: 3.03 sq mi (7.86 km^{2})

Population (2013)
  - Total: 50
  - Density: 16/sq mi (6.4/km^{2})
- Time zone: UTC+1 (CET)
  - Summer (DST): UTC+2 (CEST)

Blagaj is a village in the municipality of Donji Vakuf, Bosnia and Herzegovina.

== Demographics ==
According to the 2013 census, its population was 50.

Ethnicity in 2013
Ethnicity	Number	Percentage
Bosniaks	44	88.0%
Serbs	6	12.0%
Total	50	100%
