= Kutanja, Bosnia and Herzegovina =

Kutanja Кутања
- Village
- Location within Bosnia and Herzegovina
- Coordinates: 44.1366142°N 17.3675984°E
- Country: Bosnia and Herzegovina
- Entity: Federation of Bosnia and Herzegovina
- Canton: Central Bosnia
- Municipality: Donji Vakuf

Area
  - Total: 1.57 sq mi (4.06 km^{2})

Population (2013)
  - Total: 310
  - Density: 200/sq mi (76/km^{2})
- Time zone: UTC+1 (CET)
  - Summer (DST): UTC+2 (CEST)

Kutanja (Cyrillic: Кутања) is a village in the municipality of Donji Vakuf, Bosnia and Herzegovina.

== Demographics ==
According to the 2013 census, its population was 310.

Ethnicity in 2013
Ethnicity	Number	Percentage
Bosniaks	286	92.3%
Serbs	5	1.6%
other/undeclared	19	6.1%
Total	310	100%
