= Brezičani, Donji Vakuf =

Brezičani
- Village
- Location within Bosnia and Herzegovina
- Coordinates: 44°08′00″N 17°27′19″E
- Country: Bosnia and Herzegovina
- Entity: Federation of Bosnia and Herzegovina
- Canton: Central Bosnia
- Municipality: Donji Vakuf

Area
  - Total: 0.98 sq mi (2.54 km^{2})

Population (2013)
  - Total: 27
  - Density: 28/sq mi (11/km^{2})
- Time zone: UTC+1 (CET)
  - Summer (DST): UTC+2 (CEST)

Brezičani is a village in the municipality of Donji Vakuf, Bosnia and Herzegovina.

== Demographics ==
According to the 2013 census, its population was 27.

Ethnicity in 2013
Ethnicity	Number	Percentage
Bosniaks	26	96.3%
other/undeclared	1	3.7%
Total	27	100%
