= Ćemalovići =

Ćemalovići Ћемаловићи
- Village
- Location within Bosnia and Herzegovina
- Country: Bosnia and Herzegovina
- Entity: Federation of Bosnia and Herzegovina
- Canton: Central Bosnia
- Municipality: Donji Vakuf

Area
  - Total: 0.16 sq mi (0.41 km^{2})

Population (2013)
  - Total: 32
  - Density: 200/sq mi (78/km^{2})
- Time zone: UTC+1 (CET)
  - Summer (DST): UTC+2 (CEST)

Ćemalovići (Cyrillic: Ћемаловићи) is a village in the municipality of Donji Vakuf, Bosnia and Herzegovina.

== Demographics ==
According to the 2013 census, its population was 32, all of them Bosniaks.
