= Novo Selo, Donji Vakuf =

Novo Selo
- Village
- Location within Bosnia and Herzegovina
- Coordinates: 44°09′17″N 17°22′56″E
- Country: Bosnia and Herzegovina
- Entity: Federation of Bosnia and Herzegovina
- Canton: Central Bosnia
- Municipality: Donji Vakuf

Area
  - Total: 0.95 sq mi (2.46 km^{2})

Population (2013)
  - Total: 18
  - Density: 19/sq mi (7.3/km^{2})
- Time zone: UTC+1 (CET)
  - Summer (DST): UTC+2 (CEST)

Novo Selo is a village in the municipality of Donji Vakuf, Bosnia and Herzegovina. The etymology of the village comes from Slavic languages meaning new village, Novo Selo.

== Demographics ==
According to the 2013 census, its population was 18.

Ethnicity in 2013
Ethnicity	Number	Percentage
Bosniaks	17	94.4%
other/undeclared	1	5.6%
Total	18	100%
