= Krivače, Donji Vakuf =

Krivače
- Village
- Location within Bosnia and Herzegovina
- Coordinates: 44.2005349°N 17.3306545°E
- Country: Bosnia and Herzegovina
- Entity: Federation of Bosnia and Herzegovina
- Canton: Central Bosnia
- Municipality: Donji Vakuf

Area
  - Total: 1.24 sq mi (3.20 km^{2})

Population (2013)
  - Total: 85
  - Density: 69/sq mi (27/km^{2})
- Time zone: UTC+1 (CET)
  - Summer (DST): UTC+2 (CEST)

Krivače is a village in the municipality of Donji Vakuf, Bosnia and Herzegovina.

== Demographics ==
According to the 2013 census, its population was 85.

Ethnicity in 2013
Ethnicity	Number	Percentage
Bosniaks	84	98.8%
other/undeclared	1	1.2%
Total	85	100%
