= Jemanlići =

- Village
- Location within Bosnia and Herzegovina
- Coordinates: 44°08′N 17°26′E
- Country: Bosnia and Herzegovina
- Entity: Federation of Bosnia and Herzegovina
- Canton: Central Bosnia
- Municipality: Donji Vakuf

Area
  - Total: 1.12 sq mi (2.90 km^{2})

Population (2013)
  - Total: 209
  - Density: 187/sq mi (72.1/km^{2})
- Time zone: UTC+1 (CET)
  - Summer (DST): UTC+2 (CEST)

Jemanlići is a village in the municipality of Donji Vakuf, Bosnia and Herzegovina.

== Demographics ==
According to the 2013 census, its population was 209.

Ethnicity in 2013
Ethnicity	Number	Percentage
Bosniaks	195	93.3%
Croats	5	2.4%
other/undeclared	9	4.3%
Total	209	100%
