= Ponjavići =

- Village
- Location within Bosnia and Herzegovina
- Coordinates: 44°07′56″N 17°22′48″E
- Country: Bosnia and Herzegovina
- Entity: Federation of Bosnia and Herzegovina
- Canton: Central Bosnia
- Municipality: Donji Vakuf

Area
  - Total: 0.69 sq mi (1.80 km^{2})

Population (2013)
  - Total: 331
  - Density: 476/sq mi (184/km^{2})
- Time zone: UTC+1 (CET)
  - Summer (DST): UTC+2 (CEST)

Ponjavići is a village in the municipality of Donji Vakuf, Bosnia and Herzegovina.

== Demographics ==
According to the 2013 census, its population was 331, all Bosniaks.
