= Ajvatovica =

Religious and cultural event in Bosnia and Herzegovina

Coordinates: 44°06′N 17°23′E

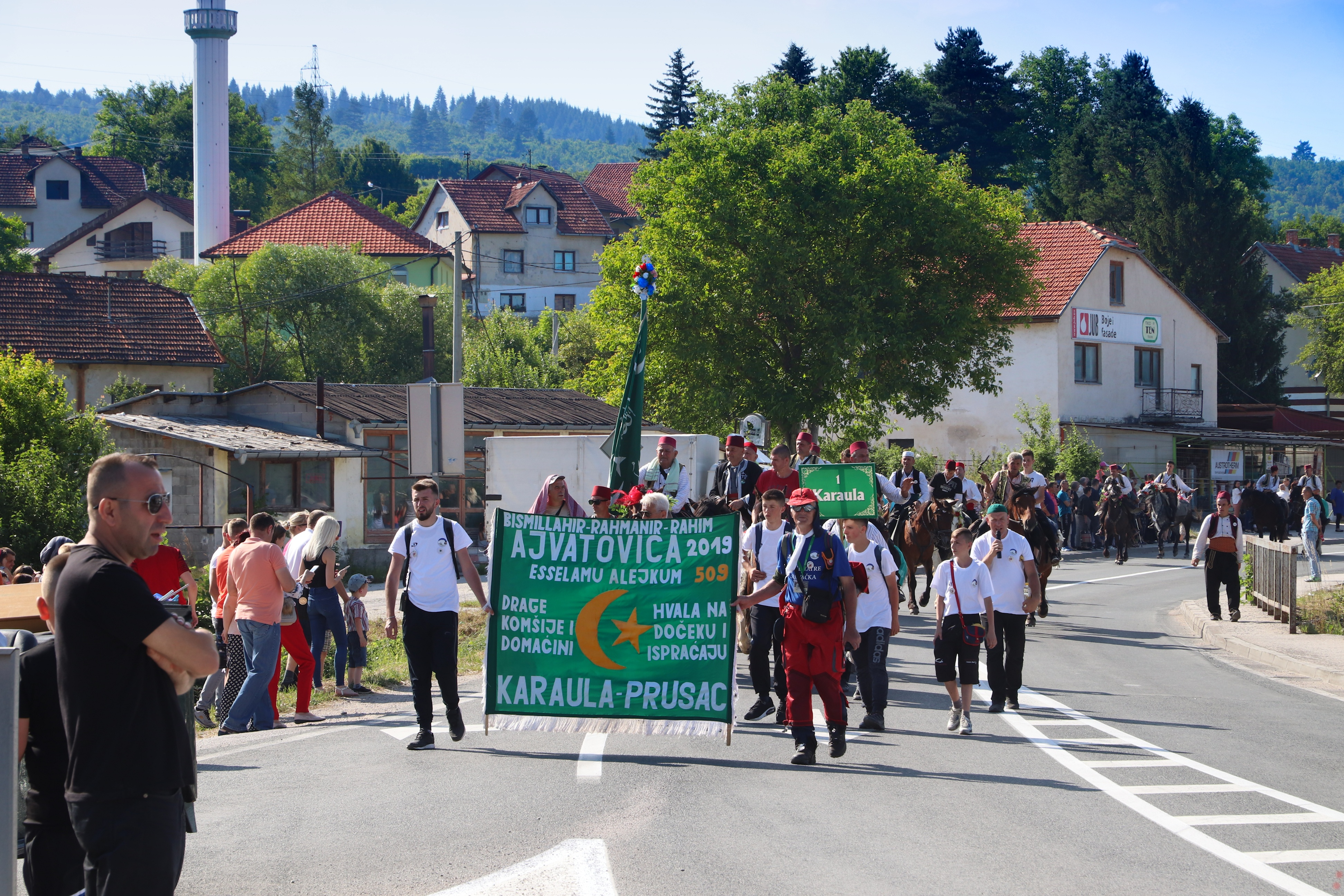
Ajvatovica procession passing through Donji Vakuf (2019)

Ajvatovica is the largest Islamic traditional, religious and cultural event in Europe. It is located near Prusac, Bosnia and Herzegovina. It was named after Ajvaz-dedo (Grandfather Ajvaz), a pious Muslim working to enlighten the population and achieve progress in the area.

== History of the Holy Site of Ajvatovica ==
Ajvaz-dedo was a Sufi dervish who arrived in Akhisar (known today as Prusac, Bosnia and Herzegovina) with the conquering Ottoman armies in 1463.

The story of the rock dividing dates back to the legend of Ajvaz-dedo, an elderly man who prayed for water during a long period of drought that threatened the small mountain hamlet of Prusac in 1510, during Ottoman rule. However, Ajvaz Dede found a powerful spring of water near the village on the mountain Šuljaga. The spring had been shut off by a rock 74 metres long and 30 metres wide, which obstructed the construction of a running water system. Ajvaz-dedo spent 40 days beseeching Allah to split the rock. On the fortieth morning, following his prayers, Ajvaz Dede dreamt that two white rams collided and split the rock. When he awoke, he saw the rock split in half. Wooden pipes were placed along the newly formed canyon to take water into Prusac. Seeing it as a sign of God's miracle and blessing, people began going on pilgrimages to the place where the rock had split.

In 1947, during the early years of communist Yugoslavia, thirteen people were convicted by the district court in Travnik for "participating in the unauthorized procession on the occasion of the religious holiday Ajvatovica, opposing state officials and violating the ban on flying religious flags." The thirteen individuals were also accused of assaulting two policemen who tried to break up the procession and threatening them with knives while on horseback. Following this incident, maintenance of the religious site was forbidden by the communist Yugoslav government until the tradition was renewed in June 1990. There are annual celebrations in Prusac to commemorate the event. It has become a large tourist and religious attraction called the "Days of Ajvatovica". The 500th anniversary of the event was commemorated in June 2010.
