= Silajdževina =

Silajdževina Силајџевина
- Village
- Location within Bosnia and Herzegovina
- Coordinates: 44°13′18″N 17°22′31″E
- Country: Bosnia and Herzegovina
- Entity: Federation of Bosnia and Herzegovina
- Canton: Central Bosnia
- Municipality: Donji Vakuf

Area
  - Total: 1.91 sq mi (4.94 km^{2})

Population (2013)
  - Total: 8
  - Density: 4.2/sq mi (1.6/km^{2})
- Time zone: UTC+1 (CET)
  - Summer (DST): UTC+2 (CEST)

Silajdževina (Cyrillic: Силајџевина) is a village in the municipality of Donji Vakuf, Bosnia and Herzegovina.

== Demographics ==
According to the 2013 census, its population was 8, all Bosniaks.
