= Doganovci =

Doganovci Догановци
- Village
- Location within Bosnia and Herzegovina
- Coordinates: 44°14′N 17°18′E
- Country: Bosnia and Herzegovina
- Entity: Federation of Bosnia and Herzegovina
- Canton: Central Bosnia
- Municipality: Donji Vakuf

Area
  - Total: 1.12 sq mi (2.91 km^{2})

Population (2013)
  - Total: 196
  - Density: 174/sq mi (67.4/km^{2})
- Time zone: UTC+1 (CET)
  - Summer (DST): UTC+2 (CEST)

Doganovci (Cyrillic: Догановци) is a village in the municipality of Donji Vakuf, Bosnia and Herzegovina.

== Demographics ==
According to the 2013 census, its population was 196, all Bosniaks.
