= Urija =

- Village
- Location within Bosnia and Herzegovina
- Coordinates: 44.1129831°N 17.3834129°E
- Country: Bosnia and Herzegovina
- Entity: Federation of Bosnia and Herzegovina
- Canton: Central Bosnia
- Municipality: Donji Vakuf

Area
  - Total: 1.46 sq mi (3.78 km^{2})

Population (2013)
  - Total: 190
  - Density: 130/sq mi (50/km^{2})
- Time zone: UTC+1 (CET)
  - Summer (DST): UTC+2 (CEST)

Urija is a village in the municipality of Donji Vakuf, Bosnia and Herzegovina.

== Demographics ==
According to the 2013 census, its population was 190.

Ethnicity in 2013
Ethnicity	Number	Percentage
Bosniaks	186	97.9%
Serbs	4	2.1%
Total	190	100%
