= Orahovljani, Donji Vakuf =

Orahovljani
- Village
- Location within Bosnia and Herzegovina
- Coordinates: 44.1794944°N 17.3565033°E
- Country: Bosnia and Herzegovina
- Entity: Federation of Bosnia and Herzegovina
- Canton: Central Bosnia
- Municipality: Donji Vakuf

Area
  - Total: 1.80 sq mi (4.66 km^{2})

Population (2013)
  - Total: 16
  - Density: 8.9/sq mi (3.4/km^{2})
- Time zone: UTC+1 (CET)
  - Summer (DST): UTC+2 (CEST)

Orahovljani is a village in the municipality of Donji Vakuf, Bosnia and Herzegovina.

== Demographics ==
According to the 2013 census, its population was 16, all Bosniaks.
