= Ruska Pilana =

- Village
- Location within Bosnia and Herzegovina
- Coordinates: 44°09′N 17°22′E
- Country: Bosnia and Herzegovina
- Entity: Federation of Bosnia and Herzegovina
- Canton: Central Bosnia
- Municipality: Donji Vakuf

Area
  - Total: 0.32 sq mi (0.84 km^{2})

Population (2013)
  - Total: 10
  - Density: 31/sq mi (12/km^{2})
- Time zone: UTC+1 (CET)
  - Summer (DST): UTC+2 (CEST)

Ruska Pilana (eng. Russian Sawmill) is a village in the municipality of Donji Vakuf, Bosnia and Herzegovina.

== Demographics ==
According to the 2013 census, its population was 10.

Ethnicity in 2013
Ethnicity	Number	Percentage
Serbs	8	80.0%
Bosniaks	2	20.0%
Total	10	100%
