= Faletići =

- Village
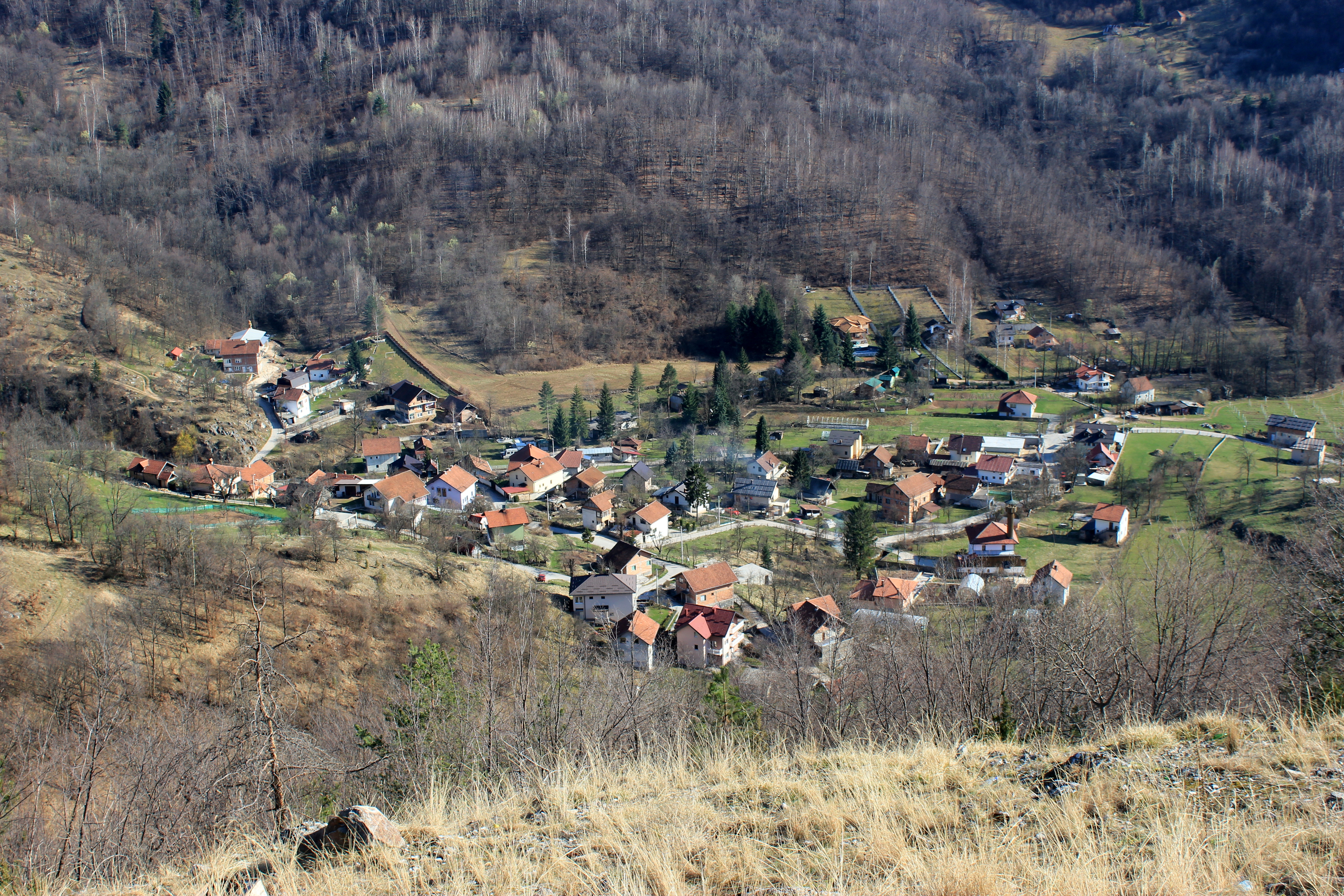

- Location within Bosnia and Herzegovina
- Coordinates: 43°52′58″N 18°28′20″E
- Country: Bosnia and Herzegovina
- Entity: Republika Srpska; Federation of Bosnia and Herzegovina
- Region Canton: Sarajevo; Sarajevo
- Municipality: Istočni Stari Grad; Stari Grad Sarajevo

Area
  - Total: 1.06 sq mi (2.75 km^{2})

Population (2013)
  - Total: 297
  - Density: 280/sq mi (108/km^{2})
- Time zone: UTC+1 (CET)
  - Summer (DST): UTC+2 (CEST)

Faletići is a village in the municipalities of Istočni Stari Grad (Republika Srpska) and Stari Grad Sarajevo, Bosnia and Herzegovina.

== Demographics ==
According to the 2013 census, its population was 297, with 35 of them living in the Republika Srpska part and 262 living in the Federation part.

Ethnicity in 2013
Ethnicity	Number	Percentage
Bosniaks	262	88.2%
Serbs	28	9.4%
other/undeclared	7	2.4%
Total	297	100%
