= Dolovi, Visoko =

Dolovi
- Village
- Location within Bosnia and Herzegovina
- Coordinates: 44.0899419°N 18.2305396°E
- Country: Bosnia and Herzegovina
- Entity: Federation of Bosnia and Herzegovina
- Canton: Zenica-Doboj
- Municipality: Visoko

Area
  - Total: 0.82 sq mi (2.12 km^{2})

Population (2013)
  - Total: 187
  - Density: 228/sq mi (88.2/km^{2})
- Time zone: UTC+1 (CET)
  - Summer (DST): UTC+2 (CEST)

Dolovi is a village in the municipality of Visoko, Bosnia and Herzegovina.

== Demographics ==
According to the 2013 census, its population was 187.

Ethnicity in 2013
Ethnicity	Number	Percentage
Bosniaks	186	99.5%
other/undeclared	1	0.5%
Total	187	100%
