= Šipovik =

- Village
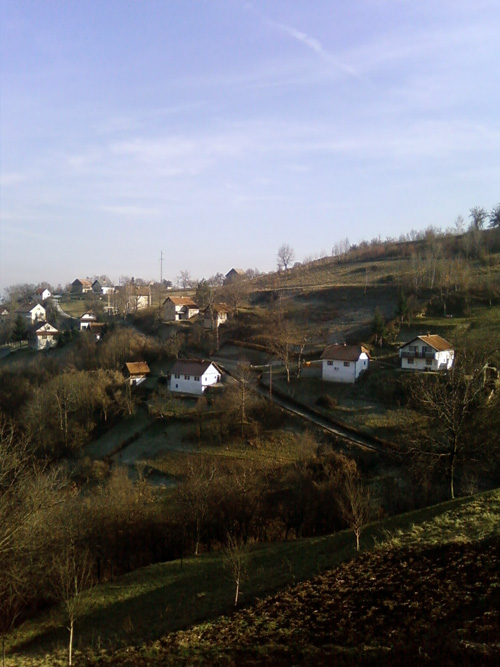

- Location within Bosnia and Herzegovina
- Coordinates: 44.225323°N 17.6253904°E
- Country: Bosnia and Herzegovina
- Entity: Federation of Bosnia and Herzegovina
- Canton: Central Bosnia
- Municipality: Travnik

Area
  - Total: 1.44 sq mi (3.74 km^{2})

Population (2013)
  - Total: 202
  - Density: 140/sq mi (54.0/km^{2})
- Time zone: UTC+1 (CET)
  - Summer (DST): UTC+2 (CEST)

Šipovik is a village in the municipality of Travnik, Bosnia and Herzegovina.

== Demographics ==
According to the 2013 census, its population was 202.

Ethnicity in 2013
Ethnicity	Number	Percentage
Croats	197	97.5%
Bosniaks	2	1.0%
Serbs	1	0.5%
other/undeclared	2	1.0%
Total	202	100%
