= Dolovi, Olovo =

Village in Olovo, Bosnia and Herzegovina

Dolovi
- Village
- Location within Bosnia and Herzegovina
- Coordinates: 44.1108289°N 18.5666547°E
- Country: Bosnia and Herzegovina
- Entity: Federation of Bosnia and Herzegovina
- Canton: Zenica-Doboj
- Municipality: Olovo

Area
  - Total: 1.48 sq mi (3.83 km^{2})

Population (2013)
  - Total: 156
  - Density: 105/sq mi (40.7/km^{2})
- Time zone: UTC+1 (CET)
  - Summer (DST): UTC+2 (CEST)

Dolovi is a village in the municipality of Olovo, Bosnia and Herzegovina.

== Demographics ==
According to the 2013 census, its population was 156.

Ethnicity in 2013
Ethnicity	Number	Percentage
Bosniaks	155	99.4%
other/undeclared	1	0.6%
Total	156	100%
