= Brdo, Donji Vakuf =

Brdo
- Village
- Location within Bosnia and Herzegovina
- Country: Bosnia and Herzegovina
- Entity: Federation of Bosnia and Herzegovina
- Canton: Central Bosnia
- Municipality: Donji Vakuf

Area
  - Total: 0.49 sq mi (1.27 km^{2})

Population (2013)
  - Total: 2
  - Density: 4.1/sq mi (1.6/km^{2})
- Time zone: UTC+1 (CET)
  - Summer (DST): UTC+2 (CEST)

Brdo is a village in the municipality of Donji Vakuf, Bosnia and Herzegovina.

The name of the village means "hill" in Croatian.

== Demographics ==
According to the 2013 census, its population was 2, all Bosniaks.
