= Dolovi (Trebinje) =

Dolovi Долови
- Village
- Location within Bosnia and Herzegovina
- Coordinates: 42°42′08″N 18°23′33″E
- Country: Bosnia and Herzegovina
- Entity: Republika Srpska
- Municipality: Trebinje
- Time zone: UTC+1 (CET)
  - Summer (DST): UTC+2 (CEST)

Dolovi (Serbian Cyrillic: Долови) is a village in the municipality of Trebinje, Bosnia and Herzegovina.
