= Dolovi, Konjic =

Dolovi Долови
- Village
- Location within Bosnia and Herzegovina
- Coordinates: 43°33′24″N 18°02′16″E
- Country: Bosnia and Herzegovina
- Entity: Federation of Bosnia and Herzegovina
- Canton: Herzegovina-Neretva
- Municipality: Konjic

Area
  - Total: 3.34 sq mi (8.66 km^{2})

Population (2013)
  - Total: 0
  - Density: 0.0/sq mi (0.0/km^{2})
- Time zone: UTC+1 (CET)
  - Summer (DST): UTC+2 (CEST)

Dolovi (Cyrillic: Долови) is a village in the municipality of Konjic, Bosnia and Herzegovina.

== Demographics ==
According to the 2013 census, its population was nil, down from 73 inhabitants (all Serbs) in 1991.
