= Rastičevo, Donji Vakuf =

Rastičevo
- Village
- Location within Bosnia and Herzegovina
- Coordinates: 44.1758585°N 17.3813292°E
- Country: Bosnia and Herzegovina
- Entity: Federation of Bosnia and Herzegovina
- Canton: Central Bosnia
- Municipality: Donji Vakuf

Area
  - Total: 2.51 sq mi (6.49 km^{2})

Population (2013)
  - Total: 51
  - Density: 20/sq mi (7.9/km^{2})
- Time zone: UTC+1 (CET)
  - Summer (DST): UTC+2 (CEST)

Rastičevo is a village in the municipality of Donji Vakuf, Bosnia and Herzegovina.

== Demographics ==
According to the 2013 census, its population was 51.

Ethnicity in 2013
Ethnicity	Number	Percentage
Bosniaks	50	98.0%
other/undeclared	1	2.0%
Total	51	100%
