= Mrđanovci, Kupres, Republika Srpska =

Mrđanovci Мрђановци
- Village
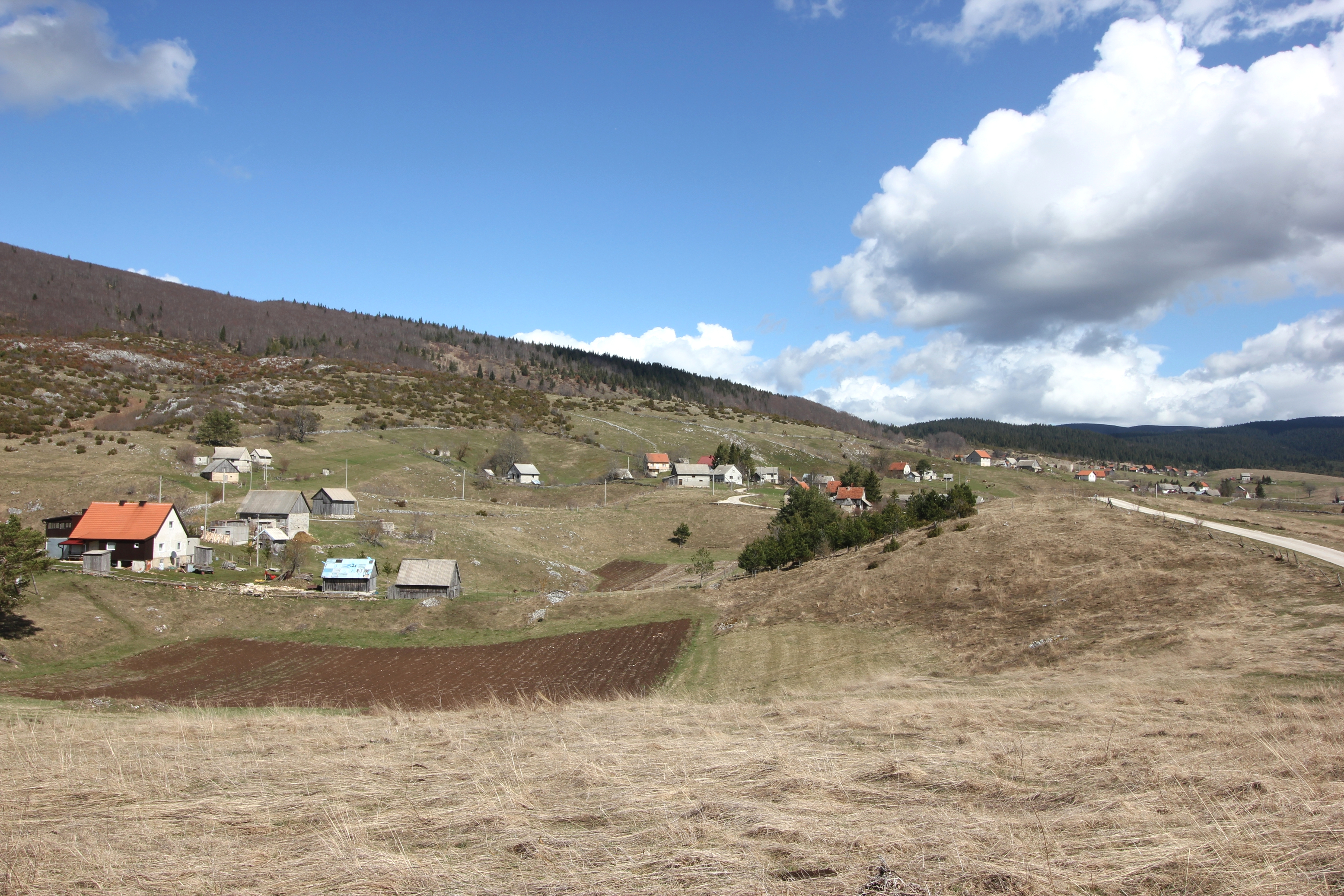

- Location within Bosnia and Herzegovina
- Coordinates: 44°04′N 17°11′E
- Country: Bosnia and Herzegovina
- Entity: Republika Srpska
- Municipality: Kupres

Area
  - Total: 17.47 km^{2} (6.75 sq mi)

Population (2013)
  - Total: 97
  - Density: 5.6/km^{2} (14/sq mi)
- Time zone: UTC+1 (CET)
  - Summer (DST): UTC+2 (CEST)

Mrđanovci (Serbian Cyrillic: Мрђановци) is a village in the municipality of Kupres, Republika Srpska, Bosnia and Herzegovina.

It forms the larger part of Mrđanovci, the smaller part being situated south of the Inter-Entity Boundary Line in the Federation, see Mrđanovci, Kupres, Canton 10.

== Demographics ==
According to the 2013 census, its population was 84.
