= Šunji =

Šunji Шуњи
- Village
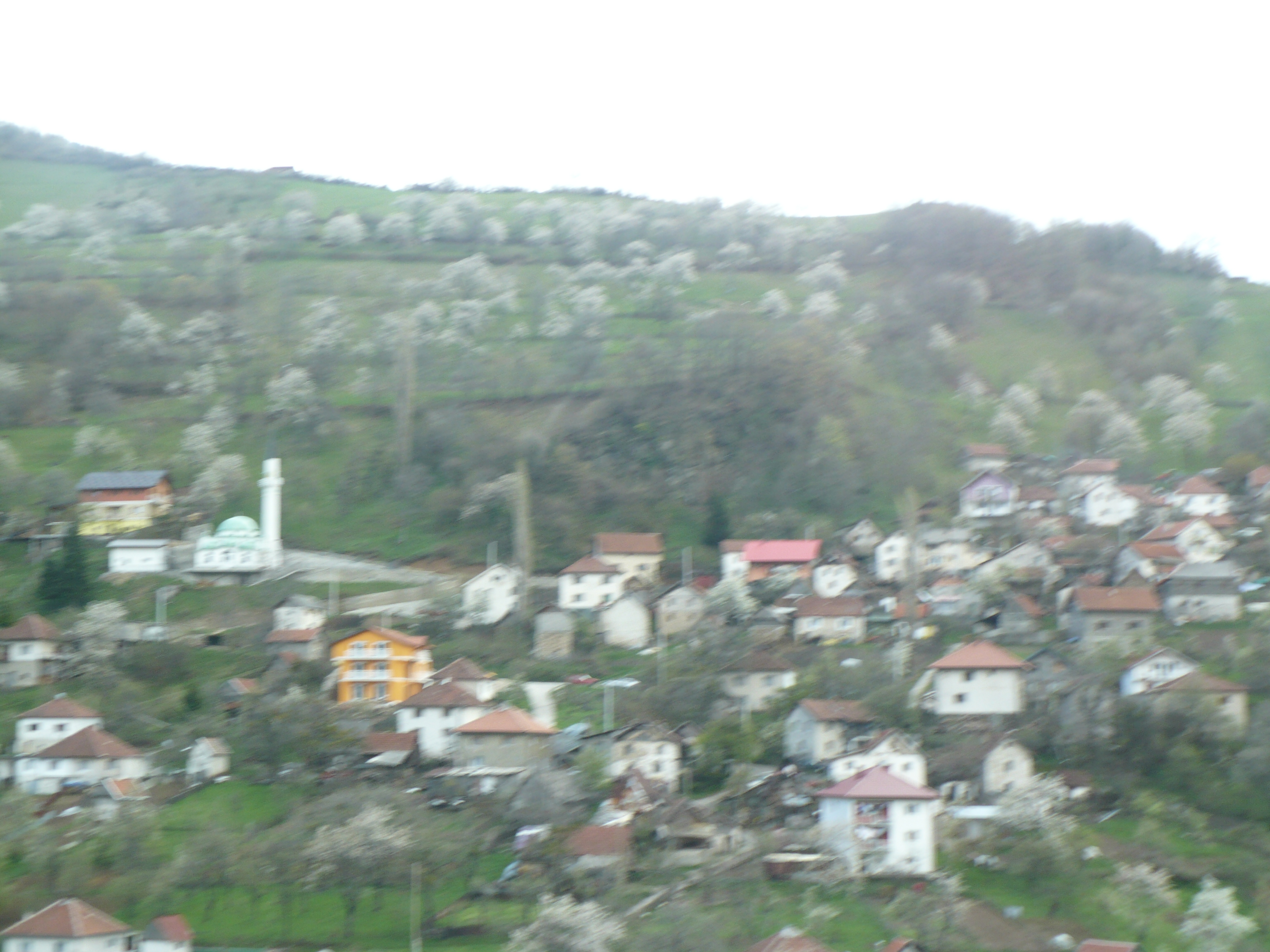

- Location within Bosnia and Herzegovina
- Coordinates: 43°43′N 18°00′E
- Country: Bosnia and Herzegovina
- Entity: Federation of Bosnia and Herzegovina
- Canton: Herzegovina-Neretva
- Municipality: Konjic

Area
  - Total: 1.25 sq mi (3.24 km^{2})

Population (2013)
  - Total: 217
  - Density: 173/sq mi (67.0/km^{2})
- Time zone: UTC+1 (CET)
  - Summer (DST): UTC+2 (CEST)

Šunji (Cyrillic: Шуњи) is a village in the municipality of Konjic, Bosnia and Herzegovina.

== Demographics ==
According to the 2013 census, its population was 217, all Bosniaks.
