= Rudina, Kardzhali Province =

Rudina Рудина
- Village
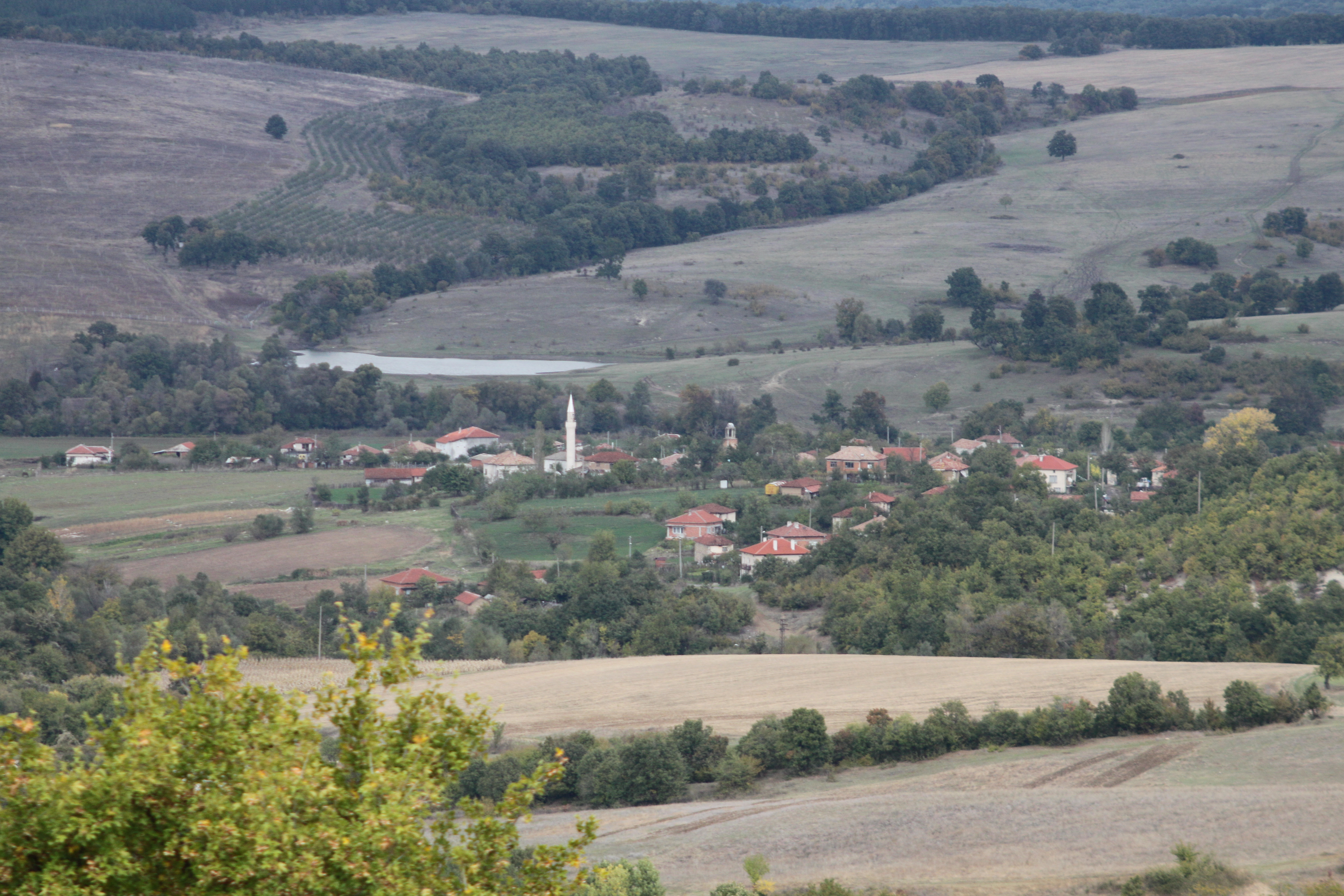
- Rudina, 2011

- Location within Bulgaria
- Coordinates: 41.7167°N 25.6000°E
- Country: Bulgaria
- Province: Kardzhali Province
- Municipality: Kardzhali
- Time zone: UTC+2 (EET)
  - Summer (DST): UTC+3 (EEST)

Rudina is a village in Kardzhali Municipality, Kardzhali Province, southern Bulgaria.
