= Rastičevo, Kupres, Republika Srpska =

Rastičevo Растичево
- Village
- Location within Bosnia and Herzegovina
- Coordinates: 44°02′47″N 17°13′05″E
- Country: Bosnia and Herzegovina
- Entity: Republika Srpska
- Municipality: Kupres

Area
  - Total: 19.48 km^{2} (7.52 sq mi)

Population (2013)
  - Total: 10
  - Density: 0.51/km^{2} (1.3/sq mi)
- Time zone: UTC+1 (CET)
  - Summer (DST): UTC+2 (CEST)

Rastičevo is a village in the municipality of Kupres, Republika Srpska, Bosnia and Herzegovina.

== Demographics ==
According to the 2013 census, the village was uninhabited.
