= Šešići =

- Village
- Location within Bosnia and Herzegovina
- Coordinates: 44.2687202°N 17.522283°E
- Country: Bosnia and Herzegovina
- Entity: Federation of Bosnia and Herzegovina
- Canton: Central Bosnia
- Municipality: Travnik

Area
  - Total: 0.75 sq mi (1.94 km^{2})

Population (2013)
  - Total: 191
  - Density: 255/sq mi (98.5/km^{2})
- Time zone: UTC+1 (CET)
  - Summer (DST): UTC+2 (CEST)

Šešići is a village in the municipality of Travnik, Bosnia and Herzegovina.

== Demographics ==
According to the 2013 census, its population was 191.

Ethnicity in 2013
Ethnicity	Number	Percentage
Bosniaks	182	95.3%
Croats	8	4.2%
other/undeclared	1	0.5%
Total	191	100%
