= Rudina, Donji Vakuf =

Rudina
- Village
- Location within Bosnia and Herzegovina
- Coordinates: 44°12′N 17°20′E
- Country: Bosnia and Herzegovina
- Entity: Federation of Bosnia and Herzegovina
- Canton: Central Bosnia
- Municipality: Donji Vakuf

Area
  - Total: 1.68 sq mi (4.34 km^{2})

Population (2013)
  - Total: 64
  - Density: 38/sq mi (15/km^{2})
- Time zone: UTC+1 (CET)
  - Summer (DST): UTC+2 (CEST)

Rudina is a village in the municipality of Donji Vakuf, Bosnia and Herzegovina.

== Demographics ==
According to the 2013 census, its population was 64.

Ethnicity in 2013
Ethnicity	Number	Percentage
Bosniaks	56	87.5%
other/undeclared	8	12.5%
Total	64	100%
