= Ferizovići =

Ferizovići Феризовићи
- Village
- Location within Bosnia and Herzegovina
- Coordinates: 43°48′07″N 18°57′56″E
- Country: Bosnia and Herzegovina
- Entity: Republika Srpska
- Municipality: Rogatica
- Time zone: UTC+1 (CET)
  - Summer (DST): UTC+2 (CEST)

Ferizovići (Serbian Cyrillic: Феризовићи) is a village in the Republika Srpska, Bosnia and Herzegovina. According to the 1991 census, the village is located in the municipality of Rogatica.
