= Dobro Brdo =

Dobro Brdo Добро Брдо
- Village
- Location within Bosnia and Herzegovina
- Coordinates: 44°15′N 17°20′E
- Country: Bosnia and Herzegovina
- Entity: Federation of Bosnia and Herzegovina
- Canton: Central Bosnia
- Municipality: Donji Vakuf

Area
  - Total: 0.88 sq mi (2.29 km^{2})

Population (2013)
  - Total: 13
  - Density: 15/sq mi (5.7/km^{2})
- Time zone: UTC+1 (CET)
  - Summer (DST): UTC+2 (CEST)

Dobro Brdo (Cyrillic: Добро Брдо) is a village in the municipality of Donji Vakuf, Bosnia and Herzegovina.

== Demographics ==
According to the 2013 census, its population was 13, all Bosniaks.
