= Šutkovići =

Šutkovići Шутковићи
- Village
- Location within Bosnia and Herzegovina
- Coordinates: 44°09′N 17°26′E
- Country: Bosnia and Herzegovina
- Entity: Federation of Bosnia and Herzegovina
- Canton: Central Bosnia
- Municipality: Donji Vakuf

Area
  - Total: 0.26 sq mi (0.67 km^{2})

Population (2013)
  - Total: 0
  - Density: 0.0/sq mi (0.0/km^{2})
- Time zone: UTC+1 (CET)
  - Summer (DST): UTC+2 (CEST)

Šutkovići (Cyrillic: Шутковићи) is a village in the municipality of Donji Vakuf, Bosnia and Herzegovina.

== Demographics ==
According to the 2013 census, the population of Šutkovići was nil, a decrease from the 78 recorded in 1991.
