= Brdo, Vitez =

Brdo
- Village
- Location within Bosnia and Herzegovina
- Coordinates: 44.1956806°N 17.7759217°E
- Country: Bosnia and Herzegovina
- Entity: Federation of Bosnia and Herzegovina
- Canton: Central Bosnia
- Municipality: Vitez

Area
  - Total: 1.37 sq mi (3.55 km^{2})

Population (2013)
  - Total: 49
  - Density: 36/sq mi (14/km^{2})
- Time zone: UTC+1 (CET)
  - Summer (DST): UTC+2 (CEST)

Brdo ("Hill" in Croatian) is a village in the municipality of Vitez, Bosnia and Herzegovina.

== Demographics ==
According to the 2013 census, its population was 49, all Croats.
