= Semin, Donji Vakuf =

Semin
- Village
- Location within Bosnia and Herzegovina
- Coordinates: 44.1547469°N 17.3523306°E
- Country: Bosnia and Herzegovina
- Entity: Federation of Bosnia and Herzegovina
- Canton: Central Bosnia
- Municipality: Donji Vakuf

Area
  - Total: 1.43 sq mi (3.71 km^{2})

Population (2013)
  - Total: 14
  - Density: 9.8/sq mi (3.8/km^{2})
- Time zone: UTC+1 (CET)
  - Summer (DST): UTC+2 (CEST)

Semin is a village in the municipality of Donji Vakuf, Bosnia and Herzegovina.

== Demographics ==
According to the 2013 census, its population was 14.

Ethnicity in 2013
Ethnicity	Number	Percentage
Bosniaks	12	85.7%
Serbs	2	14.3%
Total	14	100%
