= Šeherdžik =

- Village
- Location within Bosnia and Herzegovina
- Coordinates: 44°12′31″N 17°25′09″E
- Country: Bosnia and Herzegovina
- Entity: Federation of Bosnia and Herzegovina
- Canton: Central Bosnia
- Municipality: Donji Vakuf

Area
  - Total: 0.39 sq mi (1.00 km^{2})

Population (2013)
  - Total: 261
  - Density: 676/sq mi (261/km^{2})
- Time zone: UTC+1 (CET)
  - Summer (DST): UTC+2 (CEST)

Šeherdžik (Serbian Cyrillic: Шехерџик) is a village in the municipality of Donji Vakuf, Bosnia and Herzegovina.

== Demographics ==
According to the 2013 census, its population was 261, all Bosniaks.
