= Dolovi, Velika Kladuša =

Dolovi
- Village
- Location within Bosnia and Herzegovina
- Coordinates: 45.155355°N 15.980512°E
- Country: Bosnia and Herzegovina
- Entity: Federation of Bosnia and Herzegovina
- Canton: Una-Sana
- Municipality: Velika Kladuša

Area
  - Total: 2.07 sq mi (5.35 km^{2})

Population (2013)
  - Total: 887
  - Density: 429/sq mi (166/km^{2})
- Time zone: UTC+1 (CET)
  - Summer (DST): UTC+2 (CEST)

Dolovi is a village in the municipality of Velika Kladuša, Bosnia and Herzegovina.

== Demographics ==
According to the 2013 census, its population was 887.

Ethnicity in 2013
Ethnicity	Number	Percentage
Bosniaks	707	79.7%
Croats	3	0.3%
Serbs	2	0.2%
other/undeclared	175	19.7%
Total	887	100%
