= Fakići =

Fakići Факићи
- Village
- Location within Bosnia and Herzegovina
- Coordinates: 44°05′N 17°24′E
- Country: Bosnia and Herzegovina
- Entity: Federation of Bosnia and Herzegovina
- Canton: Central Bosnia
- Municipality: Donji Vakuf

Area
  - Total: 0.96 sq mi (2.49 km^{2})

Population (2013)
  - Total: 10
  - Density: 10/sq mi (4.0/km^{2})
- Time zone: UTC+1 (CET)
  - Summer (DST): UTC+2 (CEST)

Fakići (Cyrillic: Факићи) is a village in the municipality of Donji Vakuf, Bosnia and Herzegovina.

== Demographics ==
According to the 2013 census, its population was 10, all Croats.
