= Mrđanovci, Kupres, Canton 10 =

Mrđanovci
- Village
- Location within Bosnia and Herzegovina
- Coordinates: 44°04′N 17°11′E
- Country: Bosnia and Herzegovina
- Entity: Federation of Bosnia and Herzegovina
- Canton: Canton 10
- Municipality: Kupres

Area
  - Total: 17.47 km^{2} (6.75 sq mi)

Population (2013)
  - Total: 97
  - Density: 5.6/km^{2} (14/sq mi)
- Time zone: UTC+1 (CET)
  - Summer (DST): UTC+2 (CEST)

Mrđanovci is a village in the Municipality of Kupres in Canton 10 of the Federation of Bosnia and Herzegovina, an entity of Bosnia and Herzegovina.

It forms the smaller part of Mrđanovci village, the larger part being situated north of the Inter-Entity Boundary Line in the RS, see Mrđanovci, Kupres, Republika Srpska.

== Demographics ==
According to the 2013 census, its population was 13, all Serbs.

== Bibliography ==
- Ethnicity/National Affiliation, Religion and Mother Tongue (PDF). Sarajevo: Agency for Statistics of Bosnia and Herzegovina. 2019.
