= Đakovići (Goražde) =

- Village
- Location within Bosnia and Herzegovina
- Coordinates: 43.6450°N 19.0969°E
- Country: Bosnia and Herzegovina
- Entity: Federation of Bosnia and Herzegovina
- Canton: Bosnian-Podrinje Goražde
- Municipality: Goražde

Area
  - Total: 0.27 sq mi (0.69 km^{2})
- Elevation: 2,064 ft (629 m)

Population (2013)
  - Total: 98
  - Density: 370/sq mi (140/km^{2})
- Time zone: UTC+1 (CET)
  - Summer (DST): UTC+2 (CEST)
- Postal code: 058

Đakovići is a village in the municipality of Goražde, Bosnia and Herzegovina.

== Demographics ==
According to the 2013 census, its population was 98, all Bosniaks.
