= Dmitri Semin =

Russian ice hockey player

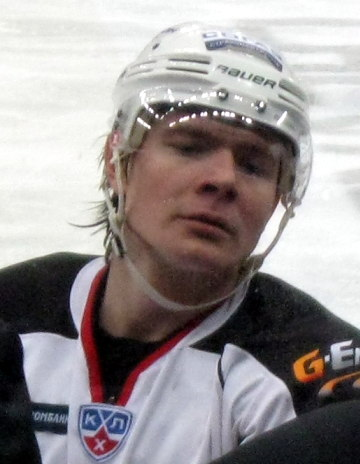
- Born: August 14, 1983 (age 42) Moscow, Russian SFSR, Soviet Union
- Height: 5 ft 10 in (178 cm)
- Weight: 176 lb (80 kg; 12 st 8 lb)
- Position: Centre
- Shot: Left
- KHL team Former teams: Free Agent; Spartak Moscow; Lokomotiv Yaroslavl; Atlant Moscow Oblast; Avangard Omsk; Salavat Yulaev Ufa; Torpedo Nizhny Novgorod; HC Vityaz
- NHL draft: 159th overall, 2001; St. Louis Blues
- Playing career: 2001–2019

Dmitri Semin (Russian: Дмитрий Сёмин, born August 14, 1983) is a Russian professional ice hockey centre who is currently an unrestricted free agent. He most recently played for Torpedo Nizhny Novgorod of the Kontinental Hockey League (KHL). He was selected by the St. Louis Blues in the 5th round (159th overall) of the 2001 NHL entry draft.

== Career statistics ==
=== Regular season and playoffs ===
			Regular season					Playoffs
Season	Team	League	GP	G	A	Pts	PIM	GP	G	A	Pts	PIM
1999–2000	Spartak Moscow	RUS.2	1	0	0	0	0	—	—	—	—	—
1999–2000	Spartak–2 Moscow	RUS.3	27	9	10	19	10	—	—	—	—	—
2000–01	Spartak Moscow	RUS.2	21	6	3	9	4	11	2	3	5	2
2001–02	Spartak Moscow	RSL	44	2	6	8	14	—	—	—	—	—
2001–02	Spartak–2 Moscow	RUS.3	5	5	0	5	4	—	—	—	—	—
2002–03	Spartak Moscow	RSL	51	9	13	22	30	—	—	—	—	—
2003–04	Spartak Moscow	RUS.2	60	15	23	38	34	13	2	2	4	2
2004–05	Spartak Moscow	RSL	53	7	7	14	34	—	—	—	—	—
2004–05	Spartak–2 Moscow	RUS.3	3	2	0	2	0	—	—	—	—	—
2005–06	Spartak Moscow	RSL	51	12	14	26	38	3	0	1	1	0
2006–07	Lokomotiv Yaroslavl	RSL	41	13	13	26	30	7	3	2	5	2
2007–08	Lokomotiv Yaroslavl	RSL	54	9	14	23	46	16	1	2	3	10
2008–09	Lokomotiv Yaroslavl	KHL	53	7	13	20	28	16	4	5	9	33
2009–10	Atlant Moscow Oblast	KHL	55	5	21	26	46	4	1	0	1	4
2010–11	Avangard Omsk	KHL	54	9	8	17	42	14	2	5	7	8
2011–12	Avangard Omsk	KHL	53	6	13	19	24	21	2	2	4	8
2012–13	Avangard Omsk	KHL	52	16	11	27	26	12	3	0	3	4
2013–14	Avangard Omsk	KHL	50	8	12	20	28	—	—	—	—	—
2014–15	Salavat Yulaev Ufa	KHL	56	7	7	14	40	5	0	0	0	4
2015–16	Torpedo Nizhny Novgorod	KHL	58	11	20	31	28	10	1	5	6	4
2016–17	Torpedo Nizhny Novgorod	KHL	60	14	18	32	28	5	0	4	4	4
2017–18	HC Vityaz	KHL	46	5	10	15	38	—	—	—	—	—
2018–19	Torpedo Nizhny Novgorod	KHL	47	3	12	15	14	7	1	0	1	4
RSL totals			294	52	67	119	192	26	4	5	9	12
KHL totals			584	91	145	236	342	94	14	21	35	73

=== International ===
Year	Team	Event	GP	G	A	Pts	PIM
2001	Russia	WJC18	6	1	4	5	0
Junior totals			6	1	4	5	0
