= Šašići =

- Village
- Location within Bosnia and Herzegovina
- Coordinates: 43°40′11″N 18°51′41″E
- Country: Bosnia and Herzegovina
- Entity: Federation of Bosnia and Herzegovina
- Canton: Bosnian-Podrinje Goražde
- Municipality: Goražde

Area
  - Total: 0.41 sq mi (1.06 km^{2})

Population (2013)
  - Total: 15
  - Density: 37/sq mi (14/km^{2})
- Time zone: UTC+1 (CET)
  - Summer (DST): UTC+2 (CEST)

Šašići is a village in the municipality of Goražde, Bosnia and Herzegovina.

== Demographics ==
According to the 2013 census, its population was 15.

Ethnicity in 2013
Ethnicity	Number	Percentage
Bosniaks	10	66.7%
Serbs	5	33.3%
Total	15	100%
