= Donji Vakuf =

Donji Vakuf Доњи Вакуф
- Town and municipality
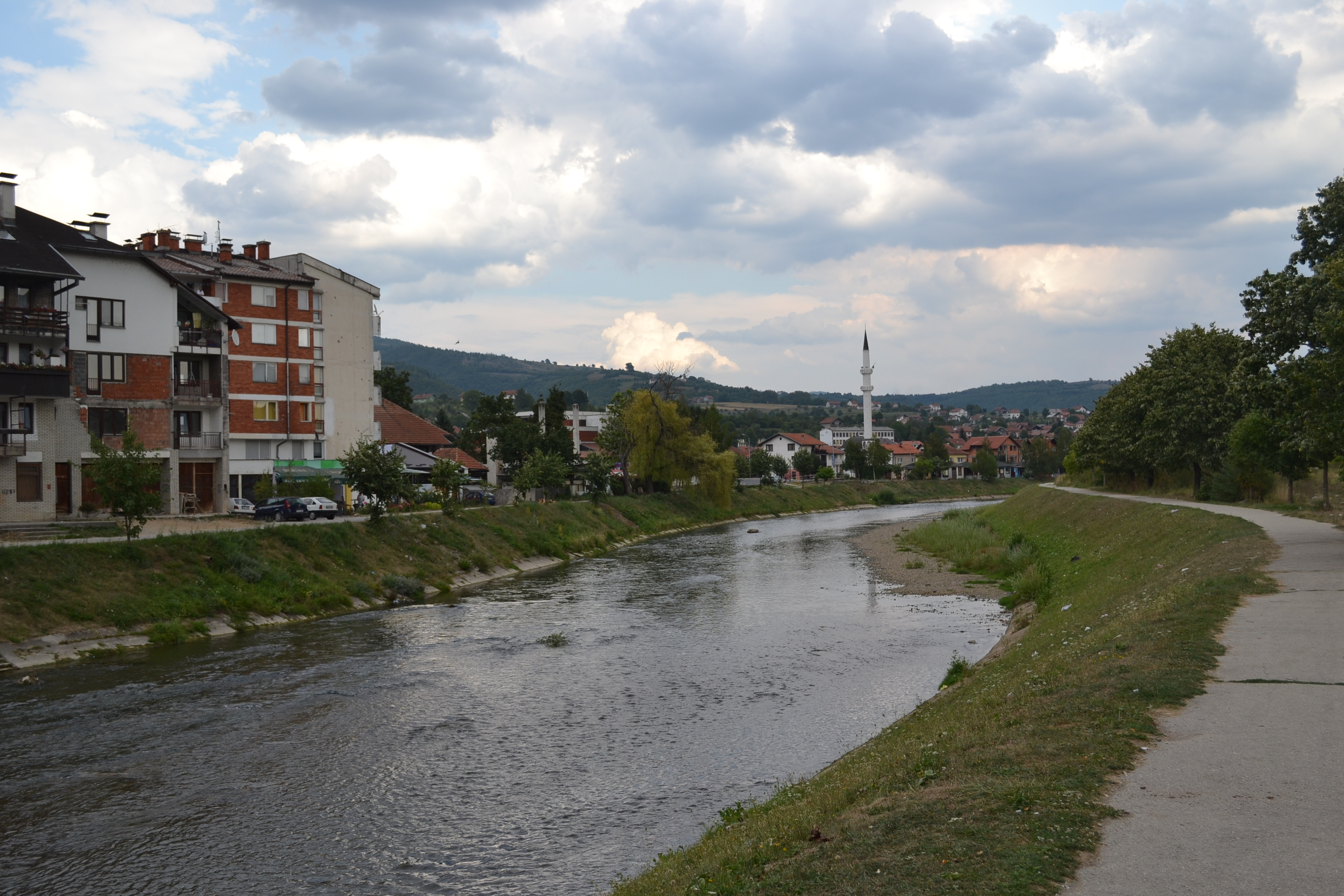

- Location of Donji Vakuf within Bosnia and Herzegovina.
- Coordinates: 44°09′N 17°24′E
- Country: Bosnia and Herzegovina
- Entity: Federation of Bosnia and Herzegovina
- Canton: Central Bosnia

Government
  - Municipal mayor: Senad Selimović (SDP BiH)

Area
  - Total: 320 km^{2} (120 sq mi)

Population (2013 census)
  - Total: 13,985
  - Density: 46/km^{2} (120/sq mi)
- Time zone: UTC+1 (CET)
  - Summer (DST): UTC+2 (CEST)
- Area code: +387 30
- Website: www.donji-vakuf.ba

Donji Vakuf (Serbian Cyrillic: Доњи Вакуф, pronounced [dɔ̂ːɲiː vǎkuf]) is a town and municipality located in the Central Bosnia Canton of the Federation of Bosnia and Herzegovina, an entity of Bosnia and Herzegovina.

It was founded by Malkoçoğlu İbrahim Bey (Bosnian: Ibrahim-beg Malkočević) in 1572 and was known as "Aşağı Vakıf" ("lower waqf", i.e. Islamic endowment in Turkish). Donji Vakuf is the Bosnian translation of "Aşağı Vakıf".

== Settlements ==
- Babin Potok
- Babino Selo
- Barice
- Blagaj
- Brda
- Brdo
- Brezičani
- Ćehajići
- Ćemalovići
- Daljan
- Dobro Brdo
- Doganovci
- Dolovi
- Donji Rasavci
- Donji Vakuf
- Đulovići
- Fakići
- Fonjge
- Galešići
- Grabantići
- Gredina
- Grič
- Guvna
- Hemići
- Jablan
- Jemanlići
- Karići
- Keže
- Komar
- Korenići
- Košćani
- Kovačevići
- Krivače
- Kutanja
- Ljuša
- Makitani
- Novo Selo
- Oborci
- Orahovljani
- Petkovići
- Piljužići
- Pobrđani
- Ponjavići
- Potkraj
- Pribraća
- Prisika
- Prusac
- Rasavci
- Rastičevo
- Rudina
- Ruska Pilana
- Sandžak
- Semin
- Silajdževina
- Slatina
- Sokolina
- Staro Selo
- Suhodol
- Sultanovići
- Suljići
- Šahmani
- Rahmani
- Šeherdžik
- Šutkovići
- Torlakovac
- Urija
- Vlađevići
- Vrljaj

== History ==
From 1929 to 1941, Donji Vakuf was part of the Vrbas Banovina of the Kingdom of Yugoslavia. From April 1993 to 14 September 1995 the town's name was Srbobran (Serbian Cyrillic: Србобран; meaning ‘Serb defender’) as it was occupied by Serb paramilitary forces. During that time the majority of Bosniaks were exiled to the neighboring town of Bugojno, and on 14 September 1995 Donji Vakuf was liberated by the Bosnian Army. The town then changed its name back to Donji Vakuf.

== Demographics ==
=== Population ===
Population of settlements – Donji Vakuf municipality
	Settlement	1961.	1971.	1981.	1991.	2013.
	Total	16,036	20,393	22,606	24,544	13,985
1	Ćehajići				321	311
2	Daljan				160	236
3	Donji Rasavci				339	204
4	Donji Vakuf		5,012	7,224	8,771	6,711
5	Jemanlići				337	209
6	Kutanja				433	310
7	Oborci				652	607
8	Ponjavići				285	331
9	Pribraća				715	426
10	Prusac				1,756	1,281
11	Šeherdžik				344	261
12	Torlakovac				766	592

=== Ethnic composition ===
Ethnic composition – Donji Vakuf town
	2013.	1991.	1981.	1971.
Total	6,711 (100,0%)	8,771 (100,0%)	7,224 (100,0%)	5,012 (100,0%)
Bosniaks	6,360 (94,77%)	5,327 (60,73%)	4,207 (58,24%)	3,723 (74,28%)
Others	276 (4,113%)	114 (1,300%)	58 (0,803%)	20 (0,399%)
Serbs	56 (0,834%)	2,616 (29,83%)	1,854 (25,66%)	882 (17,60%)
Croats	19 (0,283%)	191 (2,178%)	184 (2,547%)	278 (5,547%)
Yugoslavs		523 (5,963%)	900 (12,46%)	84 (1,676%)
Montenegrins			12 (0,166%)	5 (0,100%)
Slovenes			5 (0,069%)	3 (0,060%)
Albanians			2 (0,028%)	17 (0,339%)
Macedonians			1 (0,014%)	
Hungarians			1 (0,014%)	

Ethnic composition – Donji Vakuf municipality
	2013.	1991.	1981.	1971.	1961.
Total	13,985 (100,0%)	24,544 (100,0%)	22,606 (100,0%)	20,393 (100,0%)	16,036 (100,0%)
Bosniaks	13,376 (95,65%)	13,509 (55,04%)	11,600 (51,31%)	10,528 (51,63%)	6,289 (39.22%)
Others	444 (3,175%)	227 (0,925%)	177 (0,783%)	49 (0,240%)	51 (0.32%)
Serbs	107 (0,765%)	9,533 (38,84%)	8,574 (37,93%)	8,767 (42,99%)	7,870 (49.08%)
Croats	58 (0,415%)	682 (2,779%)	635 (2,809%)	924 (4,531%)	976 (6.09%)
Yugoslavs		593 (2,416%)	1 592 (7,042%)	90 (0,441%)	850 (5.30%)
Montenegrins			18 (0,080%)	12 (0,059%)	
Slovenes			5 (0,022%)	3 (0,015%)	
Macedonians			2 (0,009%)		
Albanians			2 (0,009%)	19 (0,093%)	
Hungarians			1 (0,004%)	1 (0,005%)	

== Tourism ==
The village of Prusac lies just outside Donji Vakuf. Bosniaks make a pilgrimage to the nearby holy site of Ajvatovica in June. It is one of the biggest events in Bosnia and Herzegovina.

== Twin towns – sister cities ==
Donji Vakuf is twinned with:

- Gömeç, Turkey, since 2002
- Hegyvidék, Hungary, since 2004
