= Battle of Kupres (1992) =

Part of the Bosnian War

Coordinates: 43.993061°N 17.276331°E

- Part of the Bosnian War
- Kupres and nearby towns on the map of Bosnia and Herzegovina
Date	3–11 April 1992
Location	Southwestern Bosnia and Herzegovina
Result	Yugoslav People's Army victory
Territorial changes	JNA captures the Kupres Plateau; territory transferred to Bosnian Serb control.

Belligerents
SFR Yugoslavia; Republika Srpska	Herzeg-Bosnia; Croatia; Bosnia and Herzegovina

Commanders and leaders
(Socialist Federal Republic of Yugoslavia) Momir Talić (Socialist Federal Republic of Yugoslavia) Stanislav Galić (Socialist Federal Republic of Yugoslavia) Slavko Lisica	(Croatian Republic of Herzeg-Bosnia) Robert Zadro † (Croatian Republic of Herzeg-Bosnia) Milivoj Petković (Croatia) Janko Bobetko

Units involved
Yugoslav People's Army; 30th Partisan Division; 13th Partisan Brigade; 19th Partisan Brigade; 9th Armoured Battalion; 11th Motorised Brigade; 5th Corps Volunteer Battalion; 5th Mixed Artillery Regiment; 5th Light AAD Regiment; Bosnian Serb TO	Croatian Defence Council; Kupres Battalion; Croatian Army; Zrinski Battalion; 204th Vukovar Brigade; 126th Sinj Home Guard Brigade; Croatian Defence Forces; 13th Battalion Jure Vitez Francetić; Prozor company; Territorial Defence Force of Bosnia and Herzegovina; Tomislavgrad TO; Posušje TO

Strength
20,000 troops	6,000 troops

Casualties and losses
85 killed 154 captured	160–177 killed 23 captured
- 38 civilians killed

The Battle of Kupres (Serbo-Croatian: Bitka za Kupres / Битка за Купрес) was a battle of the Bosnian War, fought between the Bosnian Croat Croatian Defence Forces (Hrvatske obrambene snage - HOS) supported by the Croatian Army (Hrvatska vojska – HV) troops on one side and the Yugoslav People's Army (Jugoslovenska narodna armija – JNA), augmented by the Bosnian Serb Territorial Defense Force, on the other. The battle took place at the Kupres Plateau from 3–11 April 1992. During the fighting on 8 April, the Bosnian Croat TO was reorganised as the Croatian Defence Council (Hrvatsko vijeće obrane – HVO). The objective of the battle was to control the strategic Kupres Plateau, a major supply route.

The opposing sides began bringing in reinforcements to the Kupres Plateau on 5 March to strengthen positions held around individual settlements populated by different ethnic groups, communications between those positions, and roads leading away from the plateau to the north and south. Different parts of the town of Kupres were controlled by the opposing forces, while the adjacent territory surrounding the town was controlled by the Bosnian Croat TO. In turn, that territory was surrounded by Bosnian Serb TO-held territory. By the end of the month, the bulk of the civilians living in the area were evacuated. On 2 April, negotiations to defuse the situation failed while the reinforcements continued to arrive. The battle commenced the next day. In Kupres itself, the Bosnian Croat TO achieved minor territorial gains on 4–5 April, before the JNA managed to advance to the outskirts of the town the next day. The JNA entered Kupres in the afternoon of 7 April and in the next few days, it successfully drove the Croatian forces from the plateau. The breakthrough came about after the infantry originally deployed to the battle was reinforced by an armoured battalion deployed from Knin.

Croatian forces were hampered by an inadequate command structure, poor coordination and lack heavy weapons. The battle resulted in more than 200 combat deaths, and established lines of control which would remain unchanged until 1994, when the plateau was recaptured by the HVO. In 2012, Republika Srpska authorities charged seven Croats with war crimes committed at the plateau against civilians and prisoners of war. The next year, Croatian authorities charged 21 former JNA members with war crimes against HVO prisoners captured at the Kupres Plateau.

== Background ==
As the Yugoslav People's Army (Jugoslovenska narodna armija – JNA) withdrew from Croatia following the implementation of the Vance plan, it was reorganised into a new Bosnian Serb army. This reorganisation followed the declaration of the Serbian Republic of Bosnia and Herzegovina on 9 January 1992, ahead of the 29 February – 1 March 1992 referendum on the independence of Bosnia and Herzegovina. This declaration was later cited by the Bosnian Serbs as a pretext for the Bosnian War. Bosnian Serbs began fortifying the capital, Sarajevo, and other areas on 1 March. On the following day, the first fatalities of the war were recorded in Sarajevo and Doboj. On 27 March, Bosnian Serb forces bombarded Bosanski Brod with artillery, drawing a border crossing by the Croatian Army (Hrvatska vojska – HV) 108th Brigade in response.

Control of the Kupres area was contested by Bosnian Serbs and Croats. Before the war, the former represented the majority of the population on the Kupres Plateau, comprising a total of 51 percent of its inhabitants, while Croats accounted for 39 percent. The JNA deployed an armoured unit based in Mostar to the plateau in May 1991. The bulk of the force moved to Knin three months later, while a tactical group of the 30th Partisan Division redeployed to the general area as it withdrew from Slovenia after the Ten-Day War. In September, the Bosnian Croats established the Territorial Defence Force (Teritorijalna obrana – TO) headquarters which set up armed volunteer units. By November, these units had been organised as the Kupres Battalion. The battalion consisted of five companies and an independent platoon. A Central Intelligence Agency report described the unit as a "barely organized collection of mostly local villagers and townspeople". The arming of the various forces was hampered by a UN arms embargo introduced in September 1991. In early 1992, the 30th Partisan Division was subordinated to the JNA 5th (Banja Luka) Corps and assigned Kupres as its area of responsibility (AOR). The division, likely comprising only 2,000 troops, was under the command of Colonel Stanislav Galić. As of 19 March, the 5th (Banja Luka) Corps was under command of Lieutenant General Momir Talić.

In April, the Bosnian Serbs were able to deploy 200,000 troops, hundreds of tanks, armoured personnel carriers (APCs) and artillery pieces. The Bosnian Croats could field approximately 25,000 soldiers and a handful of heavy weapons, while the Bosniaks were largely unprepared for combat with nearly 100,000 troops, but small arms for less than half of their number and virtually no heavy weapons.

== Prelude ==
On 5 March, the Bosnian Serb TO requested equipment for two companies mobilised in villages around Kupres—Malovan, Rilić and Ravno. The mobilisation was motivated by poor military intelligence provided by the 30th Partisan Division. It indicated the presence of thousands of HV and Bosnian Croat troops in the vicinity of Kupres, supported by Leopard 1 tanks drawn from a contingent of approximately 100 Leopards that the JNA believed had been delivered to Croatia. In response, the division was tasked to deploy its elements to Kupres, Ključ, Mrkonjić Grad, Šipovo, Jajce and the Mount Vlašić, take command of the Bosnian Serb TO and repel the expected Croatian attack. In order to achieve this, the division mobilised the 1st, 13th and 19th Partisan Brigades—assigning Kupres to the 19th Brigade as its AOR. By 23 March, the brigade received mobilised troops sufficient to set up three companies. Their immediate task was to block the Malovan and Kupreška Vrata mountain passes. The next day, the divisional commander toured the plateau and was informed that the Bosnian Croat forces were in control of the villages of Olovo, Osmanlije and Zlosela, in addition to Kupreška Vrata. On 26 March, the Bosnian Serb TO battalion based in Malovan was subordinated to the 19th Partisan Brigade. At this time, both sides had a relatively small portion of their force inside Kupres, while the Bosnian Croat TO held the area adjacently surrounding the town. The Bosnian Serb TO and the JNA completely controlled the areas surrounding the Bosnian Croat TO force.

The Malovan-based battalion set up its first roadblock on 26 March, and the Kupres Battalion established its own checkpoints in response the following day. On 27 March, an attempt to reach a negotiated settlement failed and the commanding officer of the 19th Partisan Brigade announced that armed combat might start at a moment's notice. The news prompted the evacuation of civilians of all ethnicities on 27–28 March. According to the daily report of the 30th Partisan Division of 29 March, the Kupres Plateau was deserted except for able bodied and armed men. The same report noted that the JNA could not deploy to Kupres itself without a fight. The JNA was convinced that the HV had intervened at Kupres to threaten the Bosnian Serbs. Kupres had a high strategic value, because it sat astride a road linking the towns of Bugojno and Tomislavgrad from the central Bosnia region to western Herzegovina and further on to Croatia.

=== Reinforcements ===
The initial phase of the Battle of Kupres

On 29 March, the 5th (Banja Luka) Corps of the JNA decided took the initiative around Kupres, redeploying elements of the 1st Battalion of the 13th Partisan Brigade to the Kupres Plateau, along with units drawn from the 9th (Knin) Corps, and the 293rd Engineer Regiment. A company of the 3rd Battalion of the 13th Partisan Brigade was also moved to the plateau on the following day, while the rest of the brigade was ordered to be ready to move to Kupres. The Kupres Battalion of the Bosnian Croat TO mobilised an additional 200 troops in Kupres the same day. On 31 March, the strengthened 1st Motorised Battalion of the 11th Motorised Infantry Brigade, drawn from the 9th (Knin) Corps, arrived at the Kupres Plateau. The battalion was strengthened by the addition of a battery of five 120-millimetre (4.7 in) mortars, six 105-millimetre (4.1 in) howitzers, three 76-millimetre (3.0 in) ZiS-3 guns and a platoon of 82-millimetre (3.2 in) recoilless rifles.

In the afternoon of 2 April, a five-hour meeting of local political leaders took place in Kupres, at the request of JNA. The purpose of the meeting, attended by members of Presidency of Bosnia and Herzegovina, Biljana Plavšić and Franjo Boras, was to defuse the situation. While there was an agreement to establish an ethnically balanced police force in Kupres and remove the roadblocks, the opposing sides could not agree on the role of the JNA. The Bosnian Serbs wanted the JNA to deploy to Kupres itself to ensure their protection, while the Bosnian Croats and Bosniaks wanted it to leave. During that same day, the 30th Partisan Division ordered the forces under its command, as well as the recent reinforcements, to capture Kupres and Kupreška Vrata and then hold their ground against anticipated Croatian counterattacks. Bosnian Croat authorities ordered the mobilisation of TO units in the nearby towns of Tomislavgrad and Posušje, with an armoured force at their disposal consisting of two T-55 tanks, two M36 tank destroyers, and one BVP M-80 infantry fighting vehicle.

There were 100–200 HV troops in Kupres during the battle. Those included a group drawn from the 204th Brigade, led by Robert Zadro (son of late Blago Zadro, former commander of the 3rd Battalion of the brigade). During the fighting, elements of the Zrinski Battalion reached Kupres, while relatively small groups of soldiers drawn from the Frankopan Battalion and the 4th Guards Brigade arrived when the battle was nearly over. A company drawn from the 126th Infantry Brigade was deployed in Šuica, but it is unclear if it actively took part in the battle. There were also Croatian Defence Forces (Hrvatske obrambene snage – HOS) units raised in Tomislavgrad and Posušje, which were involved in the fighting around Kupres. At the time, overall command of the Bosnian Croat forces was held by Brigadier Milivoj Petković.

== Timeline ==
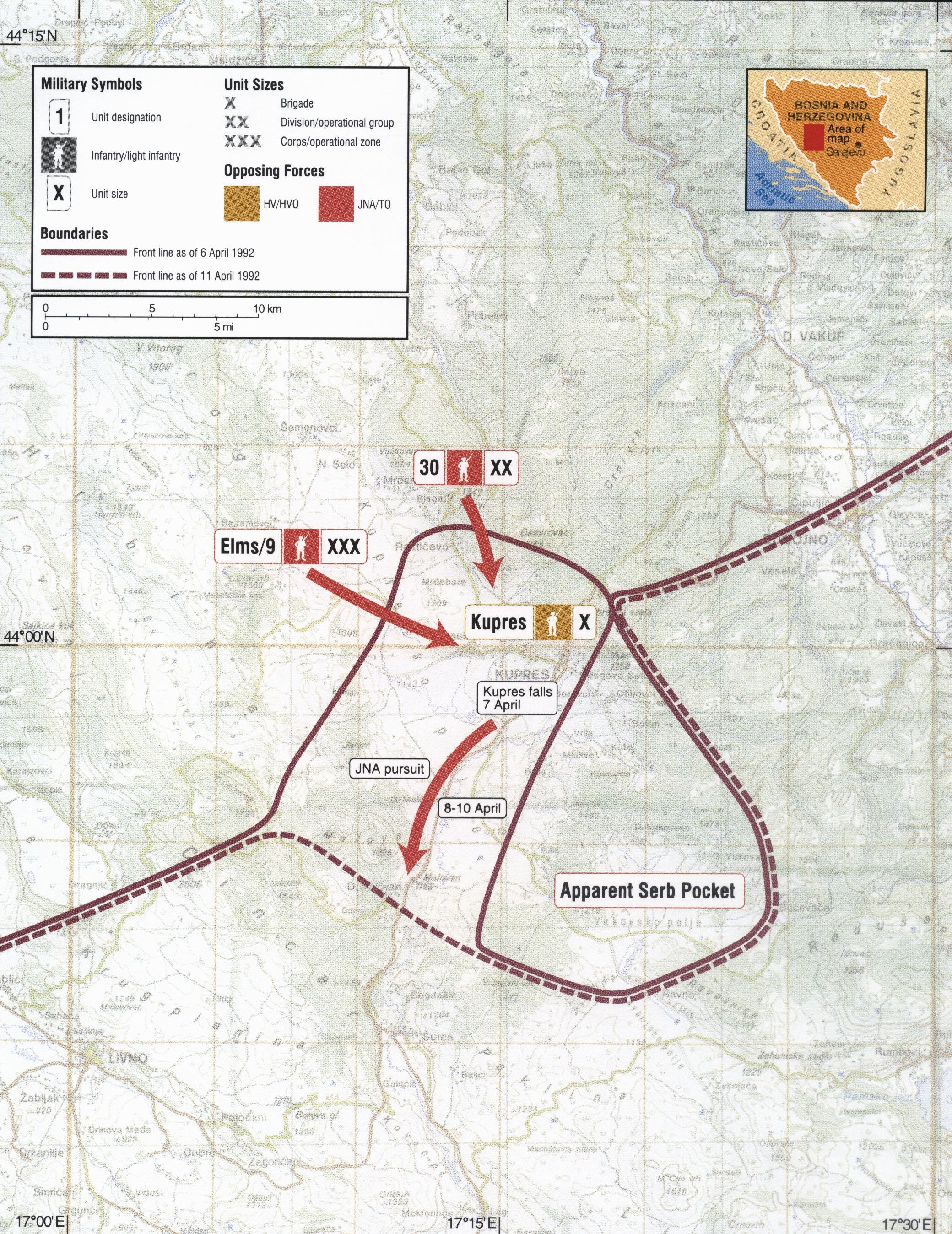
Map of the Battle of Kupres

=== 3 April ===
According to the JNA, the Bosnian Croat TO attacked in the morning of 3 April, reached the village of Donji Malovan and blockaded the Kupreška Vrata Tunnel by 7:30 a.m. The village was captured by Croats after three hours of combat, and the fighting shifted towards the village of Gornji Malovan and Kupres. By the end of the day, the Bosnian Serb TO force in Gornji Malovan was besieged. The JNA instructed the Yugoslav Air Force to attack after it received reports that 15 HV tanks had appeared on the battlefield. The 30th Partisan Division staff amended the plans formulated the previous day and advanced with elements of the 11th Motorised Brigade towards Kupres via Zlosela, against positions held by the Kupres Battalion at 1:15 p.m. The change of plans enabled elements of the 13th Partisan Brigade to catch up to them by 6:00 p.m. and caused the attack to fail.

Following news of the fighting, the 5th (Banja Luka) Corps called on its troops deployed in western Slavonia to reinforce the 30th Partisan Division. The corps felt it could weaken its positions in western Slavonia because the United Nations Protection Force (UNPROFOR) peacekeepers were expected to deploy there by the end of the month based on the Vance plan. Those troops consisted of the Volunteer Battalion of the 5th Corps, and they were augmented by the 2nd Howitzer Battalion of the 5th Mixed Artillery Regiment. The 1st Battery of the 5th Light Anti-Aircraft Defence Regiment was also added to the battalion.

=== 4–5 April ===
On 4 April, the Bosnian Croat TO captured Gornji Malovan. At the same time, the Bosnian Croat TO received reinforcements from Posušje, as well as a company from Bugojno and Uskoplje each. Fighting intensified as the JNA reinforcements arrived. A part of the Croatian reinforcements, which had just arrived from Bugojno and Uskoplje, fled after coming under attack near Zlosela. However, the JNA failed to achieve a breakthrough—even with five attack helicopters deployed in support of its advance towards Zlosela and Kupreška Vrata at 1:30 p.m.

The forces attacking towards Kupreška Vrata were redeployed the next day to assist in the advance towards Zlosela. In Kupres itself, the Bosnian Croat TO secure the western part of the town, as well as Gornji Malovan. Regardless, no significant territory changed hands. Although the 9th (Knin) Corps dispatched ten tanks to Kupres from its 9th Tank Company, commanded by Colonel Slavko Lisica, only four of them reached Kupres, as six broke down along the way. In the town of Kupres itself, the Bosnian Croat TO was reinforced by the arrival of a group drawn from the HV special forces Zrinski Battalion. The 30th Partisan Division lost contact with the JNA troops (1st Battalion of the 19th Partisan Brigade) in Kupres at 1:00 p.m.

=== 6 April ===
At dawn on 6 April, the JNA launched a fresh attack towards Kupres and Kupreška Vrata, leaving the bulk of the 13th Partisan Brigade in reserve and employing the rest of the force at the plateau. The artillery was used so intensely that the 30th Partisan Division had to request resupply of its depleted stocks. The most effective part of the advance was the 9th Tank Company, which quickly pushed through the defensive positions, bypassed Zlosela and reached Olovo. In contrast, the Bosnian Croat TO command in Kupres was overwhelmed by the complexity of the situation and could not track which units it had at its disposal—even losing track of units physically near the command post.

The JNA further reinforced its position at the Kupres Plateau by ordering the redeployment of the 9th Armoured Battalion of the 9th (Knin) Corps to the area. It also established the Operational Group 11 (OG-11) which was to take over the operation on 7 April, when the AOR of the 9th Corps was extended to the region. At the same time, the armoured and mechanised assets of the force were organised into the Tactical Group 1 (TG-1), commanded by Lisica. By the end of the day, the divisional reserve was committed to the battle, and the JNA claimed that they had captured Zlosela, Olovo and Osmanlije, as well as reaching the outskirts of Kupres. The Bosnian Croat TO captured the centre of Kupres and brought the 1st Battalion of the 19th Partisan Brigade into a difficult position, only to begin withdrawing towards Tomislavgrad after the main JNA force reached the town in the night of 6/7 April. Likewise, the Bosnian Croat TO started to pull back from Kupreška Vrata.

=== 7 April ===
On 7 April, the bulk of the 9th Armoured Battalion arrived on the battlefield, adding 17 T-55s, eight M-60 APCs and five BVP M-80s. The unit entered Kupres in the late afternoon, followed by two battalions of the 13th Partisan Brigade. A battalion of the 11th Motorised Brigade performed mopping up operations in the Zlosela area. A part of the Bosnian Croat TO force was retreating in disarray, while a portion of the force was trapped in Kupres and Zlosela, trying to break out. In the evening, as the mop-up of the Olovo and Osmanlije area was completed, the OG-11 ordered attacks against Gornji Malovan and Donji Malovan. The next day, the TG-1 received a commendation by the commander of the 9th (Knin) Corps, Major General Ratko Mladić.

=== Final operations ===
After it captured Kupres, the OG-11 turned south, in the direction of Gornji Malovan, Donji Malovan and Šuica. The attack, spearheaded by the 9th Armoured Battalion, reached Gornji Malovan on 10 April, the day Robert Zadro was killed. Fighting continued around Kupres until 11 April. Most of the Bosnian Croat TO troops, formally reorganised as the Croatian Defence Council (Hrvatsko vijeće obrane – HVO) on 8 April, withdrew from the Kupres Plateau towards Šuica, while a small portion of the troops was forced to retreat via the Mount Cincar towards Livno.

== Aftermath ==
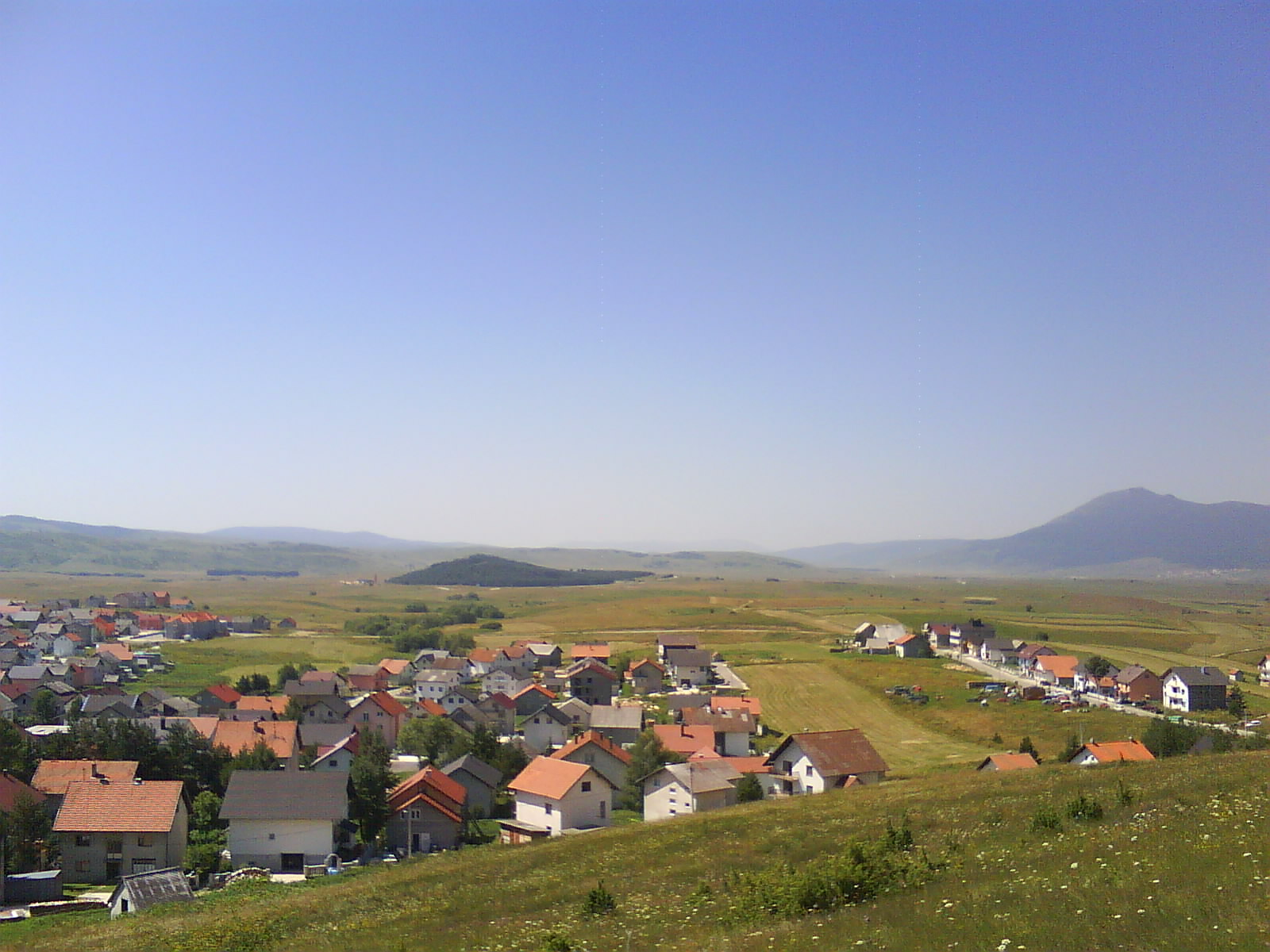
Kupres and a part of the plateau, seen in 2009

Sources disagree on the number of Bosnian Croat and HV casualties. Their number is variously reported as 160 or 177 killed. The Bosnian Serbs and the JNA sustained losses of 85 killed and 154 taken prisoner of war. The JNA also captured 23 Bosnian Croat TO troops. The figures are reported to include 19 civilian deaths on each side. Even though the Serbian media initially reported that the villages of Gornji Malovan and Donji Malovan had been torched and razed to the ground, the information proved to be incorrect—the settlements sustained relatively minor damage. Conversely, Croat- or Bosniak-inhabited villages were looted and torched. Zlosela suffered extensive damage—the village school was the only structure with a roof left in place.

Command and coordination of the Bosnian Croat forces had been particularly poor throughout the battle. HV General Janko Bobetko arrived in Tomislavgrad on 11 April to find that a company of the HV 126th Infantry Brigade, deployed to Šuica, had left its positions on its own accord. The move was followed by preparations for the evacuation of Šuica in expectation of a JNA advance south from Kupres. Bobetko managed to turn the 126th Brigade back to Šuica, persuading them to defend the town overnight in order to defend the entire region. It is not clear if the OG-11 intended to continue its advance towards Šuica though. Soon after the Battle of Kupres, a portion of the 9th Armoured Battalion was transferred to Glamoč to support the Bosnian Serb TO attack towards Livno there. The lines of control stabilised and would not shift in the area for more than two years, until the 1994 Battle of Kupres. By mid-May 1992, Bosnian Serb forces controlled approximately 60 percent of Bosnia and Herzegovina.

=== War crime charges ===
In 2012, Republika Srpska authorities charged seven Bosnian Croat officials and HVO officers with the killings of 19 Serb civilians and 20 members of the Bosnian Serb TO in the area of Kupres in 1992. The charges also pertained to the abuse of 18 prisoners of war captured in the Battle of Kupres. In 2013, Croatian authorities in Šibenik charged 21 former members of the JNA with the abuse of 23 HVO prisoners of war. The charges specify that the prisoners were detained and abused in Knin prison between 24 April and 14 May. The abuse is alleged to have caused the deaths of two of the prisoners and grave injuries to three others.
