= Battle of Kupres (1994) =

Battle of the Bosnian War

Coordinates: 43.992°N 17.277°E

- Part of the Bosnian War
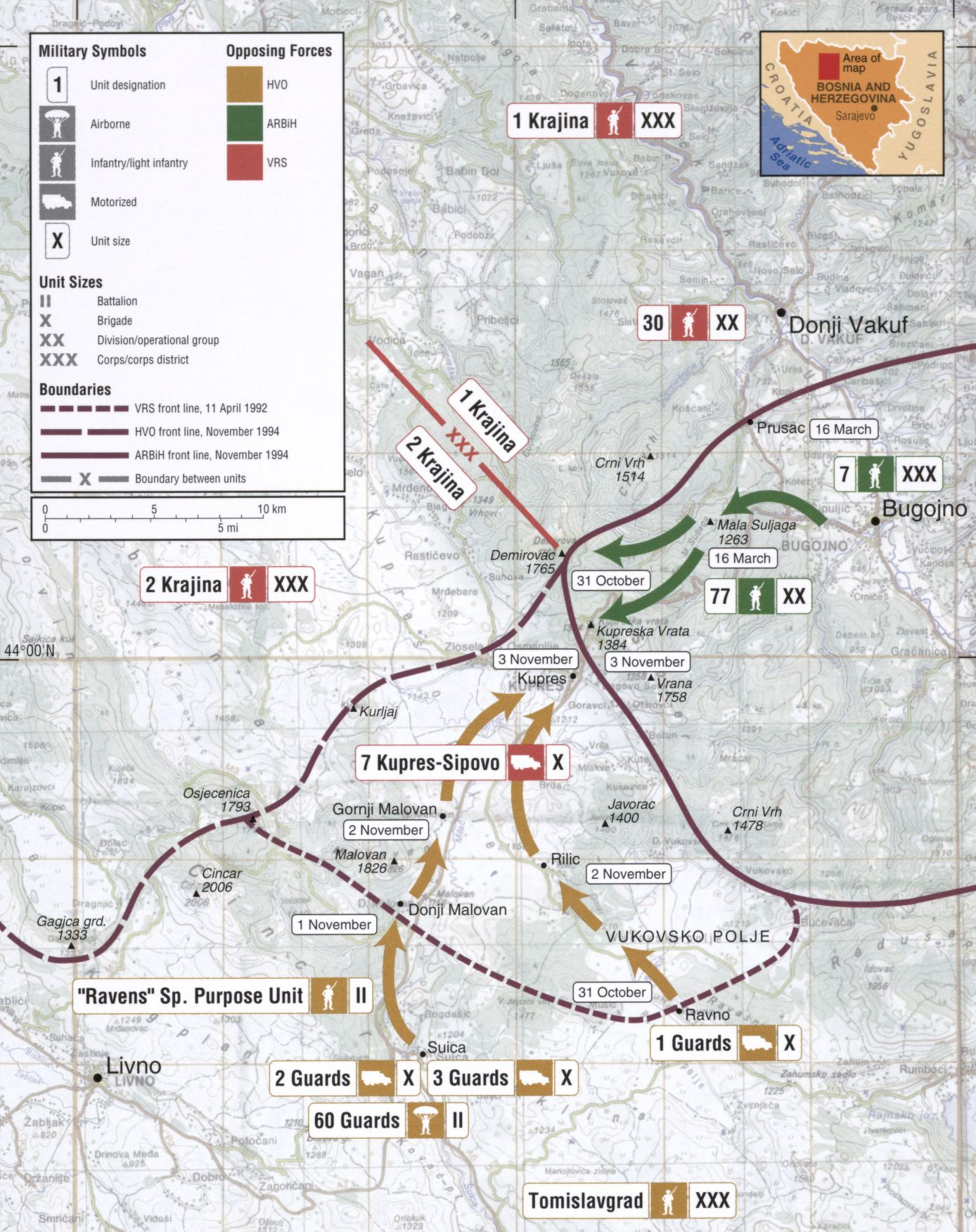
- Map of Operations Autumn-94 and Cincar
Date	20 October – 3 November 1994
Location	Southwestern Bosnia and Herzegovina
Result	ARBiH and HVO victory

Belligerents
Bosnia and Herzegovina; Herzeg-Bosnia; Croatia	Republika Srpska

Commanders and leaders
(Republic of Bosnia and Herzegovina) Rasim Delić (Republic of Bosnia and Herzegovina) Mehmed Alagić (Croatian Republic of Herzeg-Bosnia) Tihomir Blaškić (Croatian Republic of Herzeg-Bosnia) Ante Roso (Croatian Republic of Herzeg-Bosnia) Josip Černi	(Republika Srpska) Grujo Borić

Units involved
Army of the Republic of Bosnia and Herzegovina; Croatian Defence Council; Croatian Army	Army of Republika Srpska

Strength
3,130 soldiers (19 October); 8,500 soldiers (1 November); Unknown	(Republika Srpska) 2,700 soldiers (19 October) (Republika Srpska) 3,000 soldiers (1 November)

Casualties and losses
41 soldiers killed 162 soldiers wounded 4 soldiers killed 15 soldiers wounded	(Republika Srpska) Unknown

The Battle of Kupres (Bosnian, Croatian and Serbian: Bitka za Kupres) was a battle of the Bosnian War, fought between the Army of the Republic of Bosnia and Herzegovina (ARBiH) and the Croatian Defence Council (HVO) on one side and the Army of Republika Srpska (VRS) on the other from 20 October to 3 November 1994. It marks the first tangible evidence of the Bosniak–Croat alliance set out in the Washington Agreement of March 1994, brokered by the United States to end the Croat–Bosniak War fought between the ARBiH and the HVO in Bosnia and Herzegovina. The ARBiH and the HVO were not coordinated at first, rather they launched separate operations aimed at capture of Kupres.

The ARBiH offensive, codenamed Autumn-94 (Jesen-94), started on 20 October, with the primary aim of advancing from Bugojno towards VRS-held Donji Vakuf, supported by a secondary attack towards Kupres aimed at disruption of the VRS defences and threatening a supply route to Donji Vakuf. The primary attacking force soon ground to a halt, shifting the focus of the operation to Kupres, where substantial reinforcements were deployed to ensure a gradual advance of the ARBiH. On 29 October, the HVO decided to attack, as it considered the ARBiH had directly threatened the strategic Kupres plateau. The HVO launched its offensive, codenamed Operation Cincar (Operacija Cincar), on 1 November. Following a brief lull in the ARBiH advance, thought to be brought on by a variety of causes and a direct request by the President of Bosnia and Herzegovina Alija Izetbegović to the ARBiH to cooperate with the HVO, commanding officers of the two forces met to coordinate their operations for the first time since the Washington Agreement. Kupres itself was captured by the HVO on 3 November 1994.

Besides the political significance of the battle for future developments of the war in Bosnia, the battle was militarily significant for planning and execution of Operation Winter '94 by the Croatian Army (HV) and the HVO aimed at relieving the siege of Bihać in late November and December 1994. Territorial gains made by the HVO and the ARBiH in the Battle of Kupres safeguarded the right flank of Operation Winter '94.

== Background ==
The 1990 revolt of the Croatian Serbs was centered on the predominantly Serb-populated areas of the Dalmatian hinterland around the city of Knin, parts of Lika, Kordun, Banovina regions and in eastern Croatian settlements with significant Serb populations. These areas were subsequently named the Republic of Serbian Krajina (RSK). The RSK declared its intention of political integration with Serbia and was viewed by the Government of Croatia as a rebellion. By March 1991, the conflict escalated to war—the Croatian War of Independence. In June 1991, Croatia declared its independence as Yugoslavia disintegrated, followed by a three-month moratorium on the decision, thus the decision came into effect on 8 October. A campaign of ethnic cleansing was then initiated by the RSK against Croatian civilians and most non-Serbs were expelled by early 1993. By November 1993, less than 400 and 1,500–2,000 ethnic Croats remained in UN protected areas Sector South and Sector North respectively.

As the Yugoslav People's Army (JNA) increasingly supported the RSK and the Croatian police was unable to cope with the situation, the Croatian National Guard (ZNG) was formed in May 1991. The ZNG was renamed the Croatian Army (HV) in November. The establishment of the military of Croatia was hampered by a United Nations (UN) arms embargo introduced in September. The final months of 1991 saw the fiercest fighting of the war, culminating in the Battle of the barracks, the Siege of Dubrovnik, and the Battle of Vukovar.

In January 1992, the Sarajevo Agreement was signed by representatives of Croatia, the JNA and the UN, and fighting between the two sides paused. Ending the series of unsuccessful ceasefires, United Nations Protection Force (UNPROFOR) was deployed to Croatia to supervise and maintain the agreement. The conflict largely passed on to entrenched positions, and the JNA soon retreated from Croatia into Bosnia and Herzegovina, where a new conflict was anticipated, but Serbia continued to support the RSK. HV advances restored small areas to Croatian control—as the siege of Dubrovnik was lifted, and in Operation Maslenica. Croatian towns and villages were intermittently attacked by artillery, or missiles.

As the JNA disengaged in Croatia, its personnel prepared to set up a new Bosnian Serb army, as Bosnian Serbs declared the Serbian Republic of Bosnia and Herzegovina on 9 January 1992, ahead of 29 February – 1 March 1992 referendum on independence of Bosnia and Herzegovina—which would later be cited as a pretext for the Bosnian War. Bosnian Serbs set up barricades in the capital, Sarajevo and elsewhere on 1 March, and the next day the first fatalities of the war were recorded in Sarajevo and Doboj. In the final days of March, the Bosnian Serb army started artillery attacks on Bosanski Brod, and the HV 108th Brigade crossed the border adjacent to the town in reply. On 4 April, Serb artillery began shelling Sarajevo. Even though the war originally pitted Bosnian Serbs against non-Serbs in the country, it evolved into a three-sided conflict by the end of the year, as the Croat–Bosniak War started. By that time, the Bosnian Serb army—renamed Army of Republika Srpska (VRS) after the Republika Srpska state proclaimed in the Bosnian Serb-held territory—controlled about 70% of Bosnia and Herzegovina. That proportion would not change significantly over the next two years. Republika Srpska was involved in the Croatian War of Independence in a limited capacity, through military and other aid to the RSK, occasional air raids launched from Banja Luka, and most significantly through artillery attacks against urban centres.

== Prelude ==
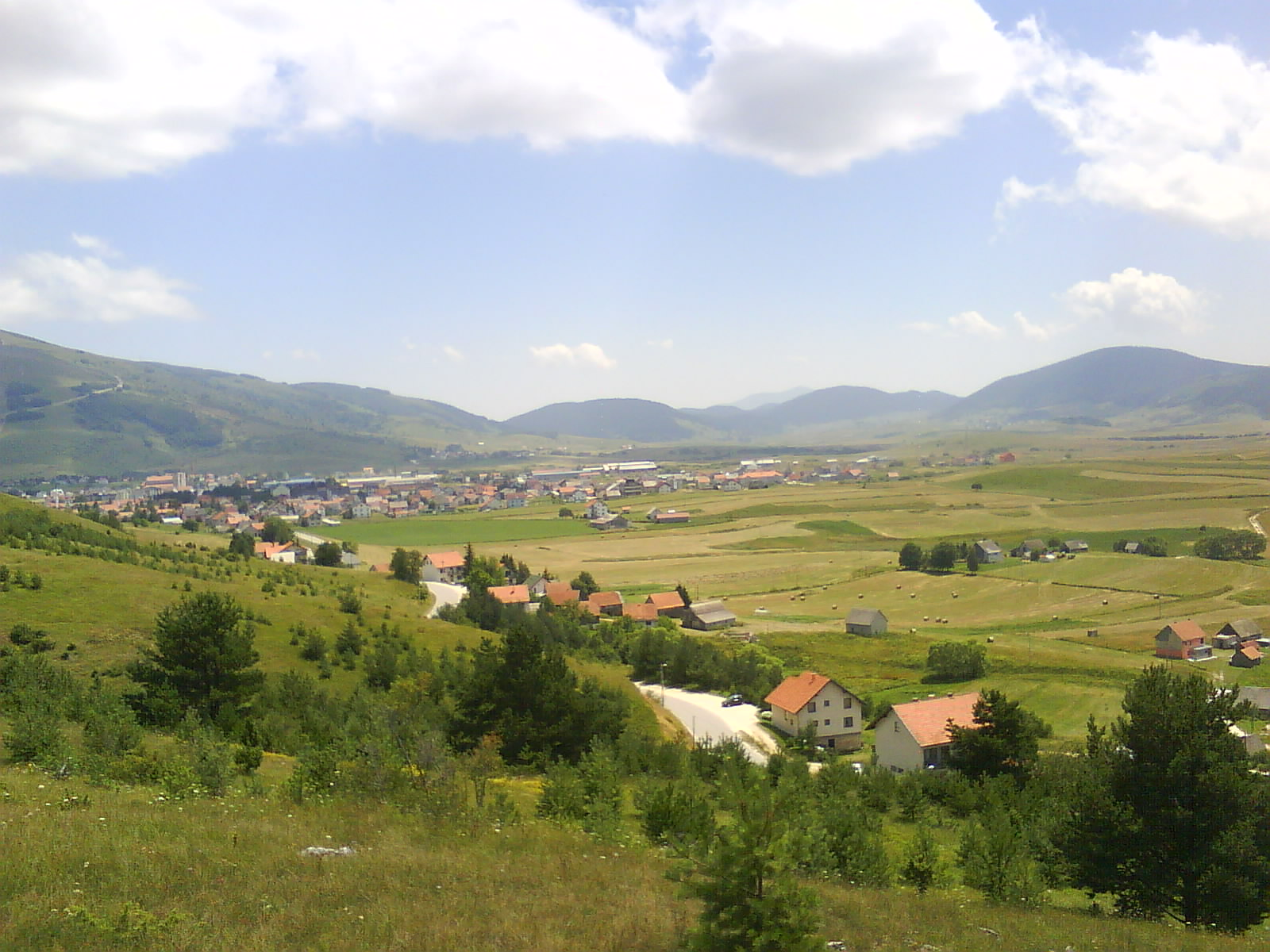
Kupres, objective of Operation Cincar and Autumn-94

Following a new military strategy of the United States endorsed by Bill Clinton since February 1993, the Washington Agreement was signed by Croatia and Bosnia and Herzegovina in March 1994. The agreement ended the Croat–Bosniak War and established the Federation of Bosnia and Herzegovina. The political settlement allowed the ARBiH and the HVO to deploy additional troops against the VRS in a series of small-scale attacks designed to wear down the Bosnian Serb military, but the attacks claimed no territorial gains before October. The ARBiH adopted an attrition warfare strategy relying on its numerical superiority compared to the VRS, which suffered from manpower shortages. This strategy aimed for limited advances, without support of heavy weapons and means of transport—unavailable to the ARBiH at the time.

In March–November 1994, the ARBiH conducted a series of attacks with relatively limited objectives, attacking the VRS at the Vlašić Mountain, the Stolice Peak of the Majevica Mountain and Donji Vakuf, as well as in the area between Tešanj and Teslić, near Brčko, Kladanj, Sarajevo, on the Bjelašnica and the Treskavica Mountain, Gračanica, Vareš, Konjic and Doboj. Further efforts were made, together with the HVO, against the VRS near Nevesinje in September–November, but most of the offensives made little or no gains. At the same time, VRS attacks north of Sarajevo were successfully repulsed. It was hoped by the ARBiH General Staff that the VRS could not muster sufficient reserves to hold off the simultaneous, relatively limited attacks. Little territory changed hands as a result of the ARBiH offensive by the end of October, but the VRS shortage of troops worsened.

Kupres was of interest to the ARBiH and the HVO, albeit for different reasons. The HVO sought to recapture the town, which had been lost in April 1992, and had been home to a significant Croat community before the war, and to gain control of the Tomislavgrad–Bugojno–Šipovo road. The ARBiH advance towards Kupres was planned as a secondary axis of its offensive towards Donji Vakuf, 20 kilometres (12 miles) to the northwest, codenamed Autumn-94. The ARBiH wanted to deny the VRS a supply route passing through Kupres in order to weaken VRS defences around Donji Vakuf.

It is not clear how the ARBiH and the HVO coordinated before their advance to Kupres. Most probably, the two forces' commands agreed on a simultaneous offensive against Kupres, without revealing actual battle plans to their counterparts. The HVO's contribution in the offensive, codenamed Operation Cincar, was planned jointly by the HVO and the HV.

== Order of battle ==
Initially, the ARBiH committed 3,130 troops to its secondary axis—the thrust towards Kupres. They were organized with the 370th Mountain Infantry Brigade on the right flank of the 14-kilometre (8.7 mi) front manned by the ARBiH 7th Corps southwest of Bugojno, and the 307th Mountain Infantry Brigade on the left flank of the ARBiH effort. In the primary attack axis zone, the ARBiH grouped about 5,600 additional troops, facing an estimated 4,800 VRS soldiers around Donji Vakuf. Kupres itself and the surrounding plateau were defended by approximately 2,700 VRS troops, assigned to the 7th Motorized Infantry Brigade of the 2nd Krajina Corps, supported by corps-level artillery and armour. The bulk of the HVO force consisted of troops contributed by the 1st, the 2nd and the 3rd Guards Brigades, supported by the Bosnian Croat special police and the 60th Guards Airborne Battalion "Ludvig Pavlović". Although participation of the HV in the battle was denied by Croatia, it is thought to have likely occurred. Specifically, the 1st Croatian Guards Brigade is thought to have taken part in the battle, and Bosnian Croat reports pertaining to the battle specify the Zrinski Battalion of the brigade as taking part in the operation. The ARBiH 7th Corps was commanded by Brigadier General Mehmed Alagić, while the HVO Tomislavgrad Corps, formally in control of Operation Cincar, was commanded by Colonel Josip Černi. The VRS 2nd Krajina Corps was under command of Colonel Radivoje Tomanić.

Army of the Republic of Bosnia and Herzegovina deployments in Operation Autumn-94
Corps	Unit	Note
7th Corps	307th Mountain Infantry Brigade	Initial deployment
7th Corps	370th Mountain Infantry Brigade	Initial deployment
7th Corps	317th Mountain Infantry Brigade	Added on 20 October
7th Corps	305th Mountain Infantry Brigade	Elements added on 21 October
7th Corps	37th Light Infantry Brigade	Added on 27 October
7th Corps	27th Mountain Infantry Brigade	Elements added on 27 October
7th Corps	1 battalion of the 7th Mountain Infantry Brigade	Conscript unit, added on 27 October
7th Corps	General Staff Guards Brigade	Added on 28 October

Croatian Defence Council deployments in Operation Cincar
Corps	Unit	Note
Tomislavgrad Corps	1st Guards Brigade "Ante Bruno Bušić"	
Tomislavgrad Corps	2nd Guards Brigade	
Tomislavgrad Corps	3rd Guards Brigade “Jastrebovi” (Hawks)	
Tomislavgrad Corps	Special Purpose Unit "Ludvig Pavlović"	
Tomislavgrad Corps	1st Home Guard Regiment	Elements only, HQ Posušje
Tomislavgrad Corps	79th Home Guard Regiment "King Tomislav"	Elements only, HQ Tomislavgrad
Tomislavgrad Corps	80th Home Guard Regiment "Petar Krešimir IV"	Elements only, HQ Livno
Tomislavgrad Corps	Special police	Bosnian Croat Ministry of Interior unit
Tomislavgrad Corps	1st Croatian Guards Brigade	(Croatian Army)

Army of Republika Srpska deployments in Operations Autumn-94 and Cincar
Corps	Unit	Note
2nd Krajina Corps	7th Motorized Infantry Brigade	
2nd Krajina Corps	Corps level artillery and armour	reinforcing the 7th Brigade

== Timeline ==
=== October ===
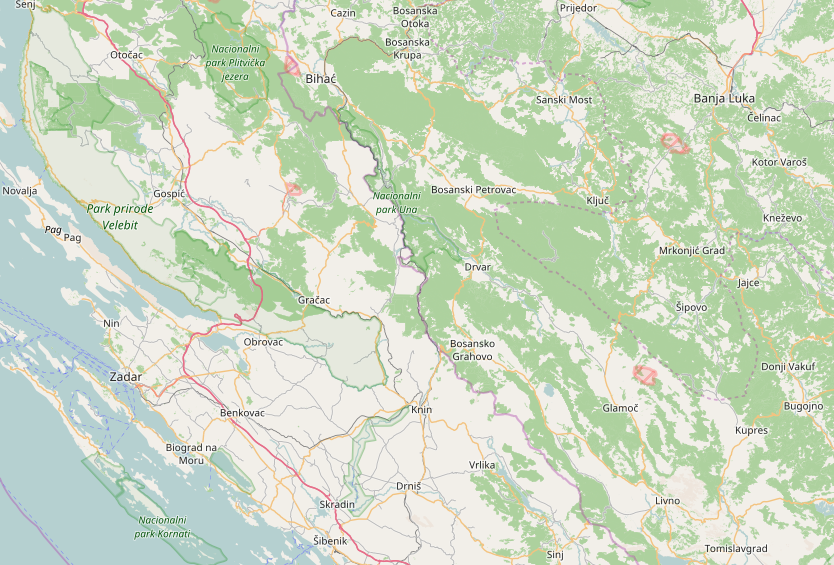
Bosnia and Herzegovina territory, before 20 October 1994:
HVO-controlled, ARBiH-controlled, VRS-controlled
Captured in Operations Cincar and Autumn-94 by HVO, ARBiH
Croatia: HV-controlled, RSK-controlled

The ARBiH launched the secondary axis of Operation Autumn-94—drive towards Kupres—at 2 am on 20 October, hours after the primary attacking force started moving against Donji Vakuf. As the primary effort of the ARBiH offensive bogged down the same day, Kupres became the main objective. The 317th Mountain Infantry Brigade was added to augment the ARBiH force that made initial advances towards Kupres. The next day, as the ARBiH gradually advanced, elements of the 305th Mountain Brigade were also sent as reinforcements to the attacking force. By 23 October, the ARBiH moved close enough to Kupres to direct heavy mortar fire against the town. On 25 October, the ARBiH 7th Corps requested a meeting with the HVO Tomislavgrad Corps representatives to coordinate further advances in the area, however the HVO postponed the meeting until after 28 October due to replacement of the Tomislavgrad Corps commanding officer. On 27 October, the ARBiH 37th Light Infantry Brigade was added to the attack, slowly progressing from one mountain ridge to the next. In addition, elements of the 27th Mountain Infantry Brigade and a battalion of the 7th Conscripted Mountain Infantry Brigade joined the ARBiH push. On 28 November, the ARBiH General Staff committed a guards brigade attached to the General Staff to the battle.

Since the beginning of the ARBiH offensive, the HVO had been assembling three of its four guards brigades under command of General Ante Roso, as well as other supporting units, including the 60th Guards Airborne Battalion. On 29 October, the Ministry of Defence of the Croatian Republic of Herzeg-Bosnia and the HVO General Staff met and decided to launch Operation Cincar to capture the town of Kupres. The decision was reportedly motivated by a desire to consolidate territory controlled by the HVO around Kupres and by the strategic importance of the Kupres plateau, which commanded the northern approaches to the HVO-held Livanjsko field. The operation was originally scheduled for 31 October at 4:30 am, only to be postponed by 24 hours, as the HVO needed more time to prepare. Delayed arrival of reconnaissance teams further postponed the HVO offensive until 8 am on 1 November 1994.

=== November ===
The HVO advanced north along two main axes of attack. The western axis advanced from Šuica along the main road towards Kupres, capturing the village of Donji Malovan on 1 November. The eastern axis of the HVO offensive moved from Ravno towards Rilić. Just as the HVO began to move north, the ARBiH suspended its westward advance. Various explanations for the pause were put forward, including fog, rain, need to secure territorial gains, wear of equipment and fatigue of personnel. Regardless, that day the President of Bosnia and Herzegovina Alija Izetbegović telephoned Alagić requesting an adequate level of cooperation and avoidance of any conflicts with the HVO. Finally, Alagić made a public call to the HVO to participate in the offensive against the VRS in Kupres. The same day, the VRS targeted Bugojno using two 9K52 Luna-M missiles.

On 2 November, the HVO captured Gornji Malovan and Rilić, while the Serb civilian population started to evacuate from Kupres. Alagić visited the HVO Tomislavgrad Corps headquarters to discuss cooperation, but refused to discuss the matter, citing inadequate officers present there, and proposed a new meeting at 11 pm that day at the ARBiH 317th Brigade headquarters in Gornji Vakuf. The Chief of the HVO General Staff, Major General Tihomir Blaškić made a written apology on behalf of the HVO claiming the HVO officers had to be elsewhere at the time. A new meeting took place as proposed by Alagić. The meeting concluded at 3 am, with an agreement between Alagić and Černi to withdraw some of the ARBiH troops on the right flank of the HVO thrust to allow the HVO to strike Kupres from that direction, and coordinate their further advances beyond Kupres. Although cooperation was established, there was no joint command of the ARBiH and the HVO.

The ARBiH pullback was completed by 11 am on 3 November, while the right flank of the ARBiH force pressed forward to capture the Kupreška Vrata Pass, 3 kilometres (1.9 miles) away from Kupres. The Bosnian Croat special police and the 60th Guards Airborne Battalion entered Kupres shortly after noon, and the HVO completed capture of the town by 1:30 pm. The HVO proceeded to capture nearly the entire Kupres plateau, bringing the 1st, the 79th and the 80th Home Guards Regiments of the HVO to hold defensive positions on the plateau. The VRS was unable to counter-attack in a timely manner, because it had no reserves in place for the task.

== Aftermath ==
The ARBiH significantly shortened its positions held opposite the VRS and captured 130 square kilometres (50 square miles) of territory, while the HVO captured nearly 400 square kilometres (150 square miles) of the area around Kupres. Battle losses of the ARBiH amounted to 41 killed in action and 162 wounded troops. By 3 November, 4 HVO troops were killed and 15 wounded, and further 3 soldiers died and 5 were wounded in a VRS counter-attack near Zlosela at 11 am on 4 November.

The Battle of Kupres was the first concrete result of the renewed Bosniak–Croat alliance in the Bosnian War, and the advance to Kupres was the first military effort coordinated between the ARBiH and the HVO since the Washington Agreement. Following the victory, morale of the ARBiH and the HVO soared. Further advantages for them were the recapture of initiative from the VRS and full control of the Split–Livno–Kupres–Bugojno road, allowing improved logistics of the ARBiH and the HVO in the area, as well as greater volume of transport of arms and ammunition, especially after the United States unilaterally ended the arms embargo against Bosnia and Herzegovina in November 1994. The move in effect allowed the HV to supply itself as the arms shipments flowed through Croatia. Finally, the outcome of the Battle of Kupres secured the right flank of the Livanjsko field, which became especially significant later that month when Operation Winter '94 was launched by the HV and the HVO northwest of Livno in order to draw off a part of the force besieging Bihać and prevent capture of Bihać by the VRS. The battle is considered to be a significant contribution to subsequent success of the HV in the Croatian War of Independence and the Bosnian War.
