= Kupres (disambiguation) =

Kupres can refer to:

- Kupres, a town in the Municipality of Kupres in Canton 10 of the Federation of Bosnia and Herzegovina, Bosnia and Herzegovina
- Kupres, Busovača, a village in Bosnia and Herzegovina
- Municipality of Kupres, a municipality in Canton 10 of the Federation of Bosnia and Herzegovina, Bosnia and Herzegovina
- Municipality of Kupres, Republika Srpska, a municipality in Republika Srpska, Bosnia and Herzegovina

== See also ==
- Battle of Kupres (disambiguation)
