= Battle of Kupres =

Battle of Kupres may refer to:

- Battle of Kupres (1942), a World War II battle of the Independent State of Croatia and the Yugoslav Partisans
- Battle of Kupres (1992), battle of the Bosnian War involving the Yugoslav People's Army and the Croatian Defence Council (HVO)
- Battle of Kupres (1994), battle of the Bosnian War involving the Army of the Republic of Bosnia and Herzegovina, the Army of Republika Srpska and the HVO

== See also ==
- Kupres (disambiguation)
