= Šemenovci =

Šemenovci may refer to the following places in Bosnia and Herzegovina :

- Šemenovci, Kupres, Canton 10
- Šemenovci, Kupres, Republika Srpska
