= Mlakva =

Mlakva may refer to:

- Mlakva, Kupres, a village in Bosnia and Herzegovina
- Mlakva, Perušić, a village in Croatia
