= Begovo Selo =

- Village
- Location within Bosnia and Herzegovina
- Coordinates: 43°59′N 17°17′E
- Country: Bosnia and Herzegovina
- Entity: Federation of Bosnia and Herzegovina
- Canton: Canton 10
- Municipality: Kupres

Area
  - Total: 6.56 km^{2} (2.53 sq mi)

Population (2013)
  - Total: 163
  - Density: 24.8/km^{2} (64.4/sq mi)
- Time zone: UTC+1 (CET)
  - Summer (DST): UTC+2 (CEST)

Begovo Selo is a village in the Municipality of Kupres in Canton 10 of the Federation of Bosnia and Herzegovina, an entity of Bosnia and Herzegovina.

== Demographics ==
According to the 2013 census, its population was 163.

Ethnicity in 2013
| Ethnicity | Number | Percentage |
|---|---|---|
| Croats | 161 | 98.8% |
| Serbs | 2 | 1.2% |
| Total | 163 | 100% |

== Bibliography ==
- Ethnicity/National Affiliation, Religion and Mother Tongue (PDF). Sarajevo: Agency for Statistics of Bosnia and Herzegovina. 2019.
