= Donje Vukovsko =

Donje Vukovsko Доње Вуковско
- Village
- Location within Bosnia and Herzegovina
- Coordinates: 43°55′00″N 17°20′37″E
- Country: Bosnia and Herzegovina
- Entity: Federation of Bosnia and Herzegovina
- Canton: Canton 10
- Municipality: Kupres

Area
  - Total: 31.07 km^{2} (12.00 sq mi)

Population (2013)
  - Total: 7
  - Density: 0.23/km^{2} (0.58/sq mi)
- Time zone: UTC+1 (CET)
  - Summer (DST): UTC+2 (CEST)

Donje Vukovsko (Serbian: Доње Вуковско) is a village in the Municipality of Kupres in Canton 10 of the Federation of Bosnia and Herzegovina, an entity of Bosnia and Herzegovina.

== Demographics ==
According to the 2013 census, its population was 7, all Serbs.

== Bibliography ==
- Ethnicity/National Affiliation, Religion and Mother Tongue (PDF). Sarajevo: Agency for Statistics of Bosnia and Herzegovina. 2019.
