= Kukavice, Kupres =

Kukavice
- Village
- Location within Bosnia and Herzegovina
- Coordinates: 43°57′00″N 17°19′18″E
- Country: Bosnia and Herzegovina
- Entity: Federation of Bosnia and Herzegovina
- Canton: Canton 10
- Municipality: Kupres

Area
  - Total: 3.87 km^{2} (1.49 sq mi)

Population (2013)
  - Total: 11
  - Density: 2.8/km^{2} (7.4/sq mi)
- Time zone: UTC+1 (CET)
  - Summer (DST): UTC+2 (CEST)

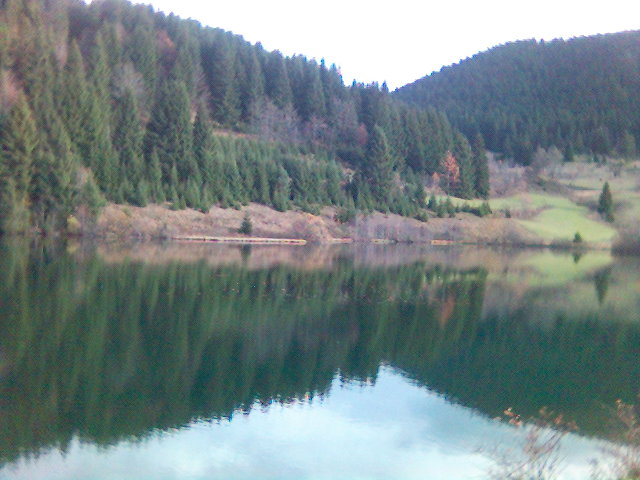
Kukavičko lake, Bosnia and Herzegovina

Kukavice is a village in the Municipality of Kupres in Canton 10 of the Federation of Bosnia and Herzegovina, an entity of Bosnia and Herzegovina.

== Demographics ==
According to the 2013 census, its population was 11, all Bosniaks.

== Bibliography ==
- Ethnicity/National Affiliation, Religion and Mother Tongue (PDF). Sarajevo: Agency for Statistics of Bosnia and Herzegovina. 2019.
