= Otinovci =

- Village
- Location within Bosnia and Herzegovina
- Coordinates: 43°59′N 17°18′E
- Country: Bosnia and Herzegovina
- Entity: Federation of Bosnia and Herzegovina
- Canton: Canton 10
- Municipality: Kupres

Area
  - Total: 9.42 km^{2} (3.64 sq mi)

Population (2013)
  - Total: 150
  - Density: 16/km^{2} (41/sq mi)
- Time zone: UTC+1 (CET)
  - Summer (DST): UTC+2 (CEST)

Otinovci is a village in the Municipality of Kupres in Canton 10 of the Federation of Bosnia and Herzegovina, an entity of Bosnia and Herzegovina.

== Demographics ==
According to the 2013 census, its population was 150.

Ethnicity in 2013
Ethnicity	Number	Percentage
Croats	142	94.7%
Bosniaks	7	4.7%
other/undeclared	1	0.7%
Total	150	100%

== Bibliography ==
- Ethnicity/National Affiliation, Religion and Mother Tongue (PDF). Sarajevo: Agency for Statistics of Bosnia and Herzegovina. 2019.
