= Mile Dedaković =

Soldier

- Born: 4 July 1951 (age 75); Nijemci, PR Croatia, FPR Yugoslavia (modern Croatia)
- Education: Yugoslav Military Academy
- Military career
- Allegiance: (Socialist Federal Republic of Yugoslavia) Yugoslavia; Croatia
- Branch: Yugoslav Air Force; Croatian National Guard
- Service years: 1991
- Rank: Lieutenant Colonel (JVO); Commander (ZNG)
- Nickname: Jastreb (Hawk)
- Commands: 204th Vukovar Brigade
- Conflicts: Croatian War of Independence: Battle of Vukovar

Mile Dedaković, also known by his nom de guerre Jastreb ("Hawk"), (born 4 July 1951) is a retired Croatian Army colonel. Dedaković is best known for commanding the 204th Vukovar Brigade and the city of Vukovar's defenses during the 1991 Battle of Vukovar in the early stages of the Croatian War of Independence.

== Biography ==
Originally from the village of Nijemci in Syrmia in eastern Croatia, Dedaković graduated from the Yugoslav People's Army (JNA) Air Force Academy and its Officer Academy before the events which led to the breakup of Yugoslavia began to unfold in 1990. Formerly a lieutenant colonel in command of a JNA military airbase near Zagreb, he joined the newly formed Croatian National Guard (ZNG) in the summer of 1991. Dedaković, an air force officer, was immediately posted to command the ZNG's brigade stationed in Vukovar, a town in eastern Croatia in his native region, which soon fell under a full-scale attack by the JNA and Serbian paramilitaries.

He assumed command of the 204th Vukovar Brigade upon its formation in September 1991. At the time of its founding, the brigade roster included 1,803 men, and was assigned to cover the area of the former municipality of Vukovar, which included the cities of Vukovar and Ilok as well as numerous surrounding villages. Dedaković commanded the brigade during the first phase of the siege of Vukovar until early October when he was reassigned to nearby Vinkovci and the command passed on to Branko Borković.

In mid-October Dedaković was put in charge of a breakthrough operation to relieve the siege of Vukovar. Although initially successful, the counter-offensive was called off by Croatian President Franjo Tuđman, reportedly under pressure from the European Community for a ceasefire. This enabled the JNA to retake the ground that it had lost and from then on the town was completely surrounded until it eventually fell on 18 November 1991.

Both Mile Dedaković and Branko Borković survived the battle and spoke out publicly against the Croatian Government's actions. In an apparent attempt to silence them, both men were briefly detained by Croatian military police, and the Croatian government suppressed an issue of the newspaper Slobodni tjednik that published a transcript of a telephone call from Vukovar, in which Dedaković had pleaded with an evasive Tuđman for military assistance. The revelations caused public outrage and reinforced perceptions that the defenders had been betrayed.

Dedaković was charged together with the leaders of the Croatian Party of Rights for an alleged preparation to attack Banski dvori, but the case was rejected at the Croatian Supreme Court.

In 1996, he published a book Bitka za Vukovar ("Battle of Vukovar"), co-authored with Radio Vukovar journalist Alenka Mirković Nađ.

In November 2005, Dedaković worked with the Ministry of Defence under Berislav Rončević to consolidate official records of the 204th Brigade. On September 25, 2006, Dedaković ceremonially reported in Vukovar, under the brigade's now-official banners, before the Commander-in-Chief President of Croatia Stjepan Mesić.

== Works ==
- Dedaković-Jastreb, Mile; Mirković-Nađ, Alenka; Runtić, Davor (2000). Bitka za Vukovar (2nd ed.). Vinkovci, Croatia: Neobična naklada. ISBN 953-6708-06-X.

== Sources ==
- Central Intelligence Agency Office of Russian and European Analysis (2000). Balkan Battlegrounds: A Military History of the Yugoslav Conflict, 1990–1995: Volume 1. Washington, D.C.: Central Intelligence Agency. ISBN 978-0-16-066472-4.
- Malović, Stjepan; Selnow, Gary W. (2001). The People, Press, and Politics of Croatia. Westport, Connecticut: Greenwood Publishing Group. ISBN 978-0-275-96543-3.
