= Novo Selo, Kupres, Canton 10 =

Novo Selo
- Village
- Novo Selo within Bosnia and Herzegovina
- Coordinates: 44°04′49″N 17°08′55″E
- Country: Bosnia and Herzegovina
- Entity: Federation of Bosnia and Herzegovina
- Canton: Canton 10
- Municipality: Kupres

Area
  - Total: 5.49 km^{2} (2.12 sq mi)

Population (2013)
  - Total: 0
  - Density: 0.0/km^{2} (0.0/sq mi)
- Time zone: UTC+1 (CET)
  - Summer (DST): UTC+2 (CEST)

Novo Selo is a village in the Municipality of Kupres in Canton 10 of the Federation of Bosnia and Herzegovina, an entity of Bosnia and Herzegovina. The etymology of the village comes from the Slavic languages, meaning "new village".

The settlement includes the uninhabited southern part of Novo Selo, while the inhabited parts are located in the Republika Srpska.

== Demographics ==
According to the 2013 census, the village was uninhabited.

== Bibliography ==
=== Books ===
- Ethnicity/National Affiliation, Religion and Mother Tongue (PDF). Sarajevo: Agency for Statistics of Bosnia and Herzegovina. 2019.
