= Odžak, Kupres =

Odžak
- Village
- Location within Bosnia and Herzegovina
- Coordinates: 43°59′37″N 17°17′14″E
- Country: Bosnia and Herzegovina
- Entity: Federation of Bosnia and Herzegovina
- Canton: Canton 10
- Municipality: Kupres

Area
  - Total: 0.86 km^{2} (0.33 sq mi)

Population (2013)
  - Total: 226
  - Density: 260/km^{2} (680/sq mi)
- Time zone: UTC+1 (CET)
  - Summer (DST): UTC+2 (CEST)

Odžak is a village in the Municipality of Kupres in Canton 10 of the Federation of Bosnia and Herzegovina, an entity of Bosnia and Herzegovina.

== Demographics ==
According to the 2013 census, its population was 226.

Ethnicity in 2013
Ethnicity	Number	Percentage
Croats	215	95.1%
Bosniaks	9	4.0%
other/undeclared	2	0.9%
Total	226	100%

== Bibliography ==
- Ethnicity/National Affiliation, Religion and Mother Tongue (PDF). Sarajevo: Agency for Statistics of Bosnia and Herzegovina. 2019.
