= Goravci =

- Village
- Location within Bosnia and Herzegovina
- Coordinates: 43°58′49″N 17°17′54″E
- Country: Bosnia and Herzegovina
- Entity: Federation of Bosnia and Herzegovina
- Canton: Canton 10
- Municipality: Kupres

Area
  - Total: 5.84 km^{2} (2.25 sq mi)

Population (2013)
  - Total: 152
  - Density: 26.0/km^{2} (67.4/sq mi)
- Time zone: UTC+1 (CET)
  - Summer (DST): UTC+2 (CEST)

Goravci is a village in the Municipality of Kupres in Canton 10 of the Federation of Bosnia and Herzegovina, an entity of Bosnia and Herzegovina.

== Demographics ==
According to the 2013 census, its population was 152.

Ethnicity in 2013
Ethnicity	Number	Percentage
Croats	140	92.1%
Bosniaks	12	7.9%
Total	152	100%

== Bibliography ==
- Ethnicity/National Affiliation, Religion and Mother Tongue (PDF). Sarajevo: Agency for Statistics of Bosnia and Herzegovina. 2019.
