= Kupres =

Kupres Купрес
- Town and municipality
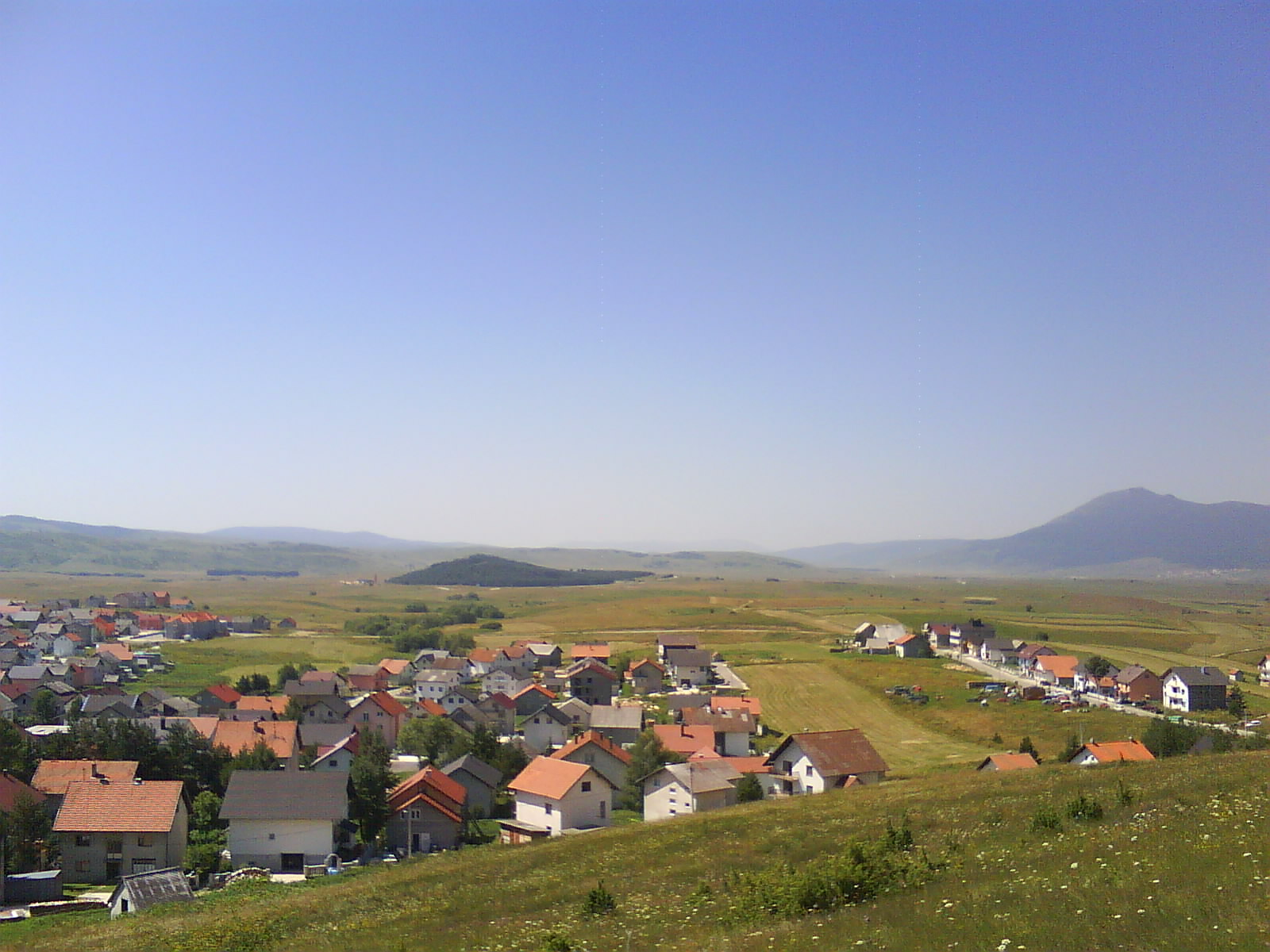
- Kupres

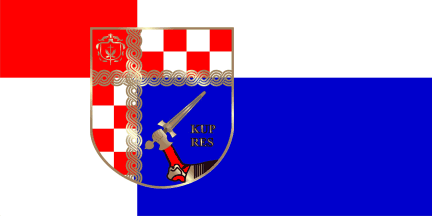
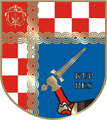
- Flag Coat of arms

- Location of Kupres within Bosnia and Herzegovina
- Coordinates: 43°59′26″N 17°16′46″E
- Country: Bosnia and Herzegovina
- Entity: Federation of Bosnia and Herzegovina
- Canton: Canton 10

Government
  - Municipal mayor: Danko Jurič (HDZ BiH)

Area
  - Total: 35.48 km^{2} (13.70 sq mi)

Population (2013 census)
  - Total: 2,883
  - Density: 81.26/km^{2} (210.5/sq mi)
- Time zone: UTC+1 (CET)
  - Summer (DST): UTC+2 (CEST)
- Area code: +387 34
- Website: opcinakupres.ba

Kupres (Serbian Cyrillic: Купрес) is a town and the seat of the Municipality of Kupres in Canton 10 of the Federation of Bosnia and Herzegovina, an entity of Bosnia and Herzegovina. As of 2013, the municipality has a population of 5,057 inhabitants, while the town of Kupres has a population of 2,883 inhabitants.

== Location ==
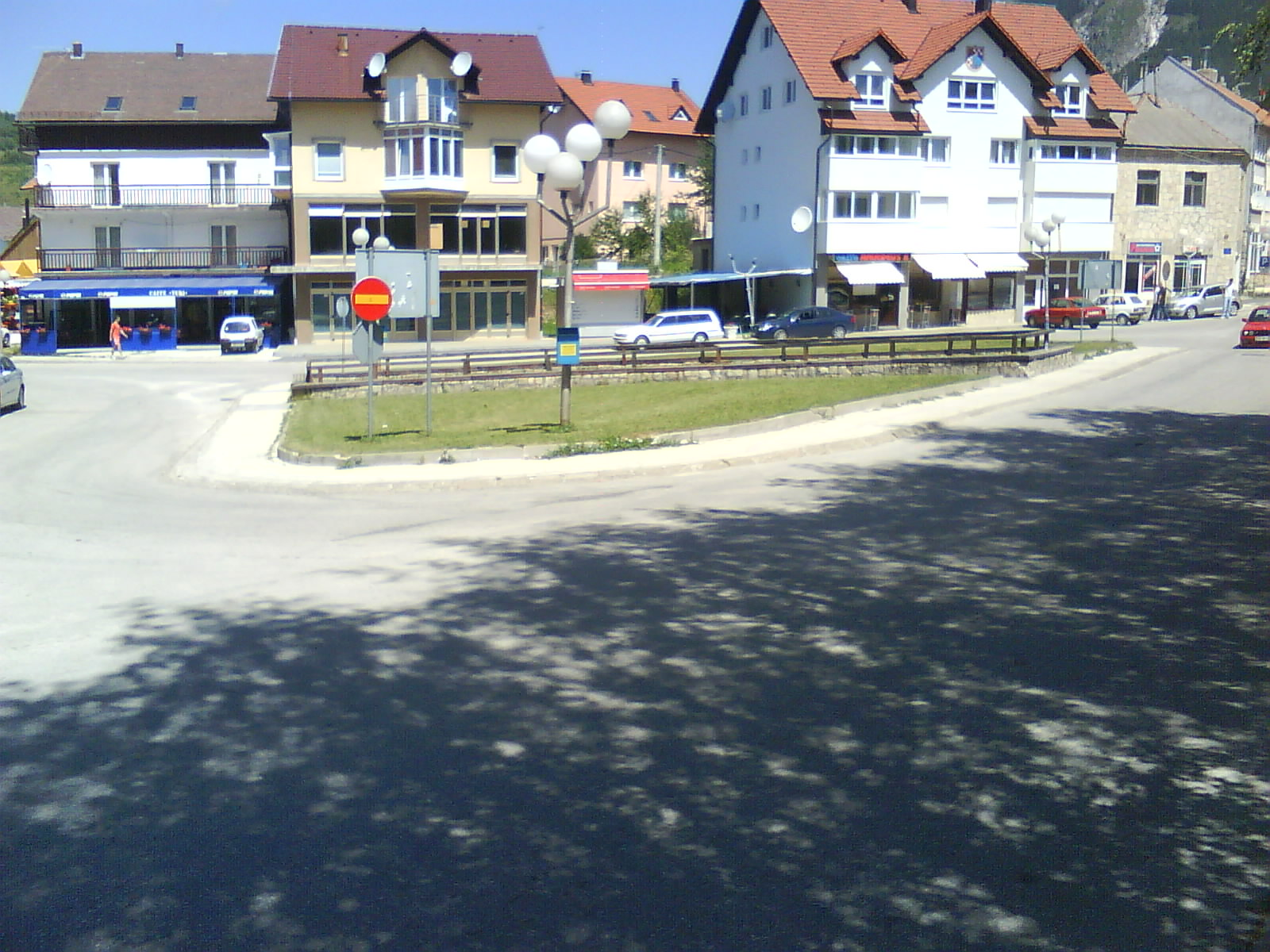
Main square

Kupres is located 43 km (27 mi) from Livno, 127 km (79 mi) from Mostar, 143 km from Sarajevo, 123 km from Banja Luka and 127 km (79 mi) from Split.

Kupres is located at an altitude between 1,120 and 1,250 m (3,675 and 4,101 ft) and averages 55 days a year of snowfall due to its advantageous location in the Dinaric Alps.

The town has good road network (state road M-16) and bus line heading towards Tomislavgrad, Livno and Mostar, and is connected to the nearby town of Bugojno in Bosnia Proper via a tunnel called the "Kupreška vrata" (en. the "Gates of Kupres"). It also has daily bus line towards the Croatian cities of Zagreb, Split and Osijek.

== History ==
The first traces of human settlement date back to prehistoric times, with a few archaeological findings supporting this. In the period between the Neolithic and the IV century B.C., the area of Kupres was inhabited by the Illyrians (Dalmatae tribe) along with the Celts, who were much more technologically advanced than the Illyrians. Both of these nations left the area or were assimilated following the Roman Conquest during the time of the first Roman Emperor Augustus. The Roman Empire governed these areas until its collapse in 476 A.D.

Kupres was first mentioned in documents from the Kingdom of Croatia, which was based in nearby Duvno (now called Tomislavgrad). During its history, Kupres was part of the Kingdom of Croatia, Bosnian Kingdom, Ottoman Empire and Austro-Hungarian monarchy, following the occupation and subsequent annexation of Bosnia. After World War I, Kupres found itself in the State of Slovenes, Croats and Serbs (SHS), and not long afterwards in the Kingdom of Yugoslavia (within the Vrbas Banovina and later the Banovina of Croatia). During World War II, Kupres was a strategically important town of the Independent State of Croatia defended by the notorious Black Legion and the place where the famous Battle of Kupres took place in 1942. After the collapse of Nazi Germany and its puppet state the NDH, Kupres became part of the newly founded Socialist Federal Republic of Yugoslavia within the SR Bosnia and Herzegovina and it remained in it until the proclamation of the Independence of Bosnia and Herzegovina in 1992 that led to the War in Bosnia and Herzegovina. During that time, Kupres was held by Serb forces from April 1992 and was part of the Republic of Srpska. Kupres was taken back by Croat forces in November 1994, when it became part of the Croat Republic of Herzeg-Bosnia and later, after its dissolution, part of the Federation of Bosnia and Herzegovina, remaining so to this day.

=== Strategic importance and battles during WW2 and Bosnian war ===
The town is situated in the middle of the Kupres Plain (Kupreško Polje), which has a high strategic importance because of its control of traffic communication between Dalmatia and Central Bosnia. That made Kupres important in previous wars, which is shown in a famous saying: "Whoever holds this high plain can negotiate with its enemies in any way he wishes."

When the German and Italian Zones of Influence were revised on 24 June 1942, Kupres fell in Zone III, administered civilly by Croatia and militarily by Croatia and Germany.

Kupres was the scene of the Battle of Kupres, fought in 1942 during World War 2 in the Independent State of Croatia between the forces of the Independent State of Croatia and the Yugoslav Partisans in and around the town of Kupres in western Bosnia.

Kupres saw fierce fighting in the recent War in Bosnia and Herzegovina in the 1990s, leaving the town extensively damaged and the local economy in ruins. Both are being restored the benefit of the community and the region, especially related to tourism infrastructure.

The first battle took place in 1992, when the town of Kupres fell into Serb control. The Battle was fought between the Bosnian Croat Territorial Defence Force (Teritorijalna obrana – TO) supported by the Croatian Army (Hrvatska vojska – HV) troops on one side and the Yugoslav People's Army (Jugoslovenska narodna armija – JNA), supported by the Bosnian Serb TO on the other at the Kupres Plateau, on 3–11 April 1992. Croatian forces were hampered by an inadequate command structure, poor coordination and lacking heavy weapons. The battle resulted in more than 200 combat deaths, and established lines of control which would remain unchanged until 1994, when the plateau was recaptured by Croat forces. In 2012, Republika Srpska authorities charged seven Croats with war crimes committed at the plateau against civilians and prisoners of war. The following year, Croatian authorities charged 21 former JNA members with war crimes against HVO prisoners captured at the Kupres Plateau.

The second battle during the Bosnian war took place in 1994 and was fought between the Army of the Republic of Bosnia and Herzegovina (ARBiH) and the Croatian Defence Council (HVO) on one side and the Army of Republika Srpska (VRS) on the other from 20 October to 3 November 1994. It marks the first tangible evidence of the Bosniak–Croat alliance set out in the Washington Agreement of March 1994, brokered by the United States to end the Croat–Bosniak War fought between the ARBiH and the HVO in Bosnia and Herzegovina. On 29 October, the HVO decided to attack, as it considered the ARBiH had directly threatened the strategic Kupres plateau. The HVO launched its offensive, codenamed Operation Cincar (Operacija Cincar), on 1 November. Following a brief lull in the ARBiH advance, thought to be brought on by a variety of causes and a direct request by the president of Bosnia and Herzegovina Alija Izetbegović to the ARBiH to cooperate with the HVO, commanding officers of the two forces met to coordinate their operations for the first time since the Washington Agreement. Kupres itself was captured by the HVO on 3 November 1994. Besides the political significance of the battle for future developments of the war in Bosnia, the battle was militarily significant for planning and executing of Operation Winter '94 by the Croatian Army (HV) and the HVO aimed at breaking the siege of Bihać in late November and December 1994. Territorial gains made by the HVO and the ARBiH in the Battle of Kupres safeguarded the right flank of Operation Winter '94.

=== 1995 Division of the pre-war municipality of Kupres ===
Following the Dayton Agreement, which split Bosnia and Herzegovina following the War in Bosnia and Herzegovina according to ethnic lines and war frontlines, the town has evolved into a Croat-dominated town. The ethnic Serb population had mostly left, forming their own municipality from the northernmost part of the pre-war municipality (called Kupres, Republika Srpska, which includes the village of Novo Selo) — nowadays a part of the Republika Srpska.

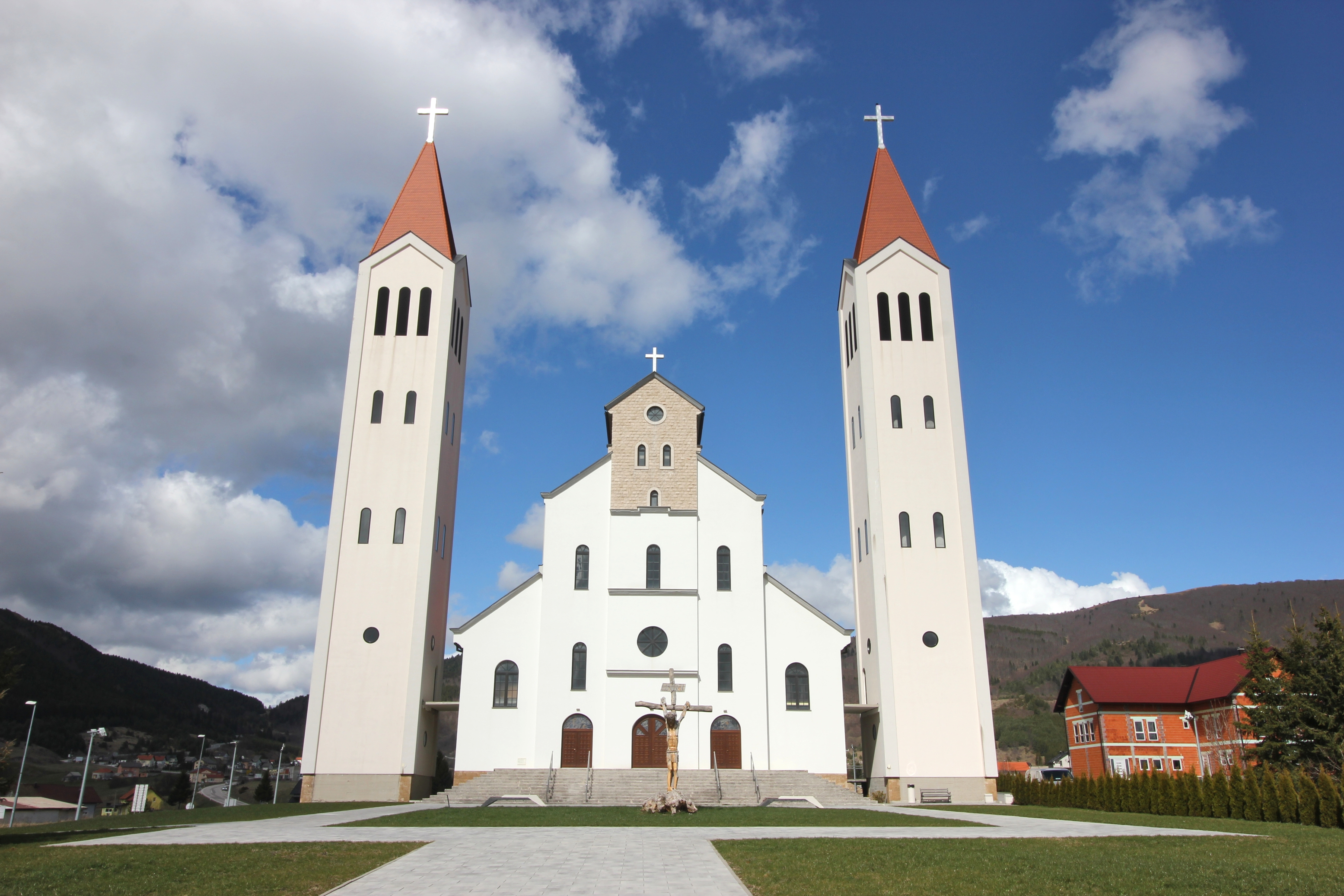
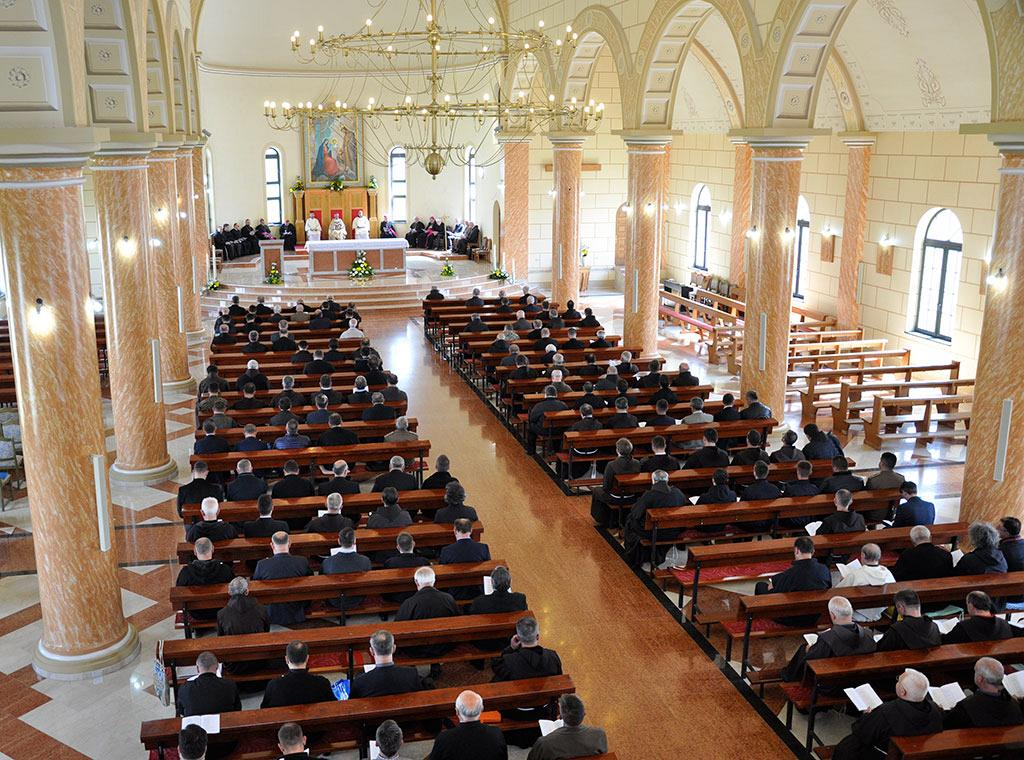
Roman Catholic Basilica of the Holy Family

== Demographics ==
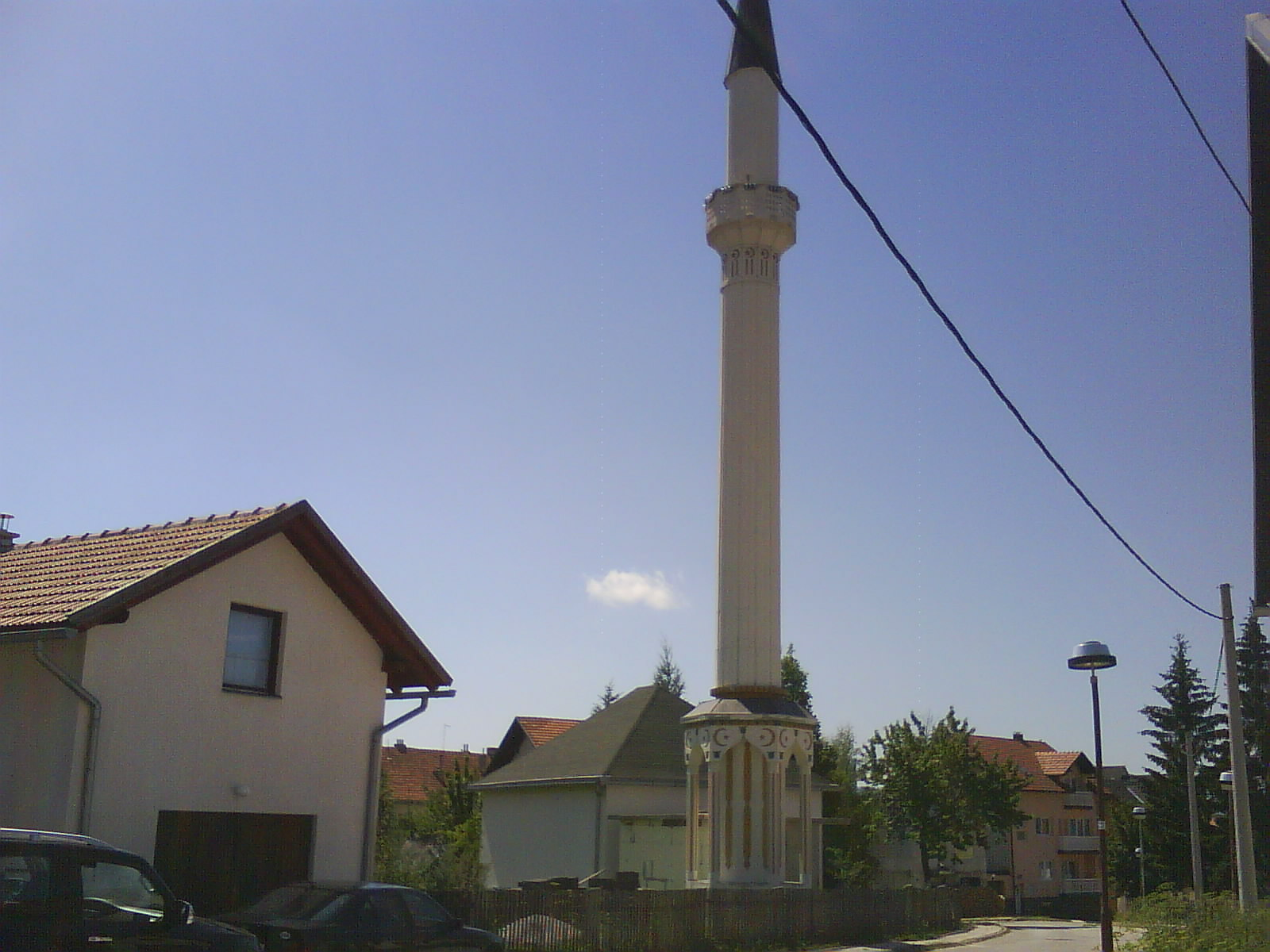
Mosque in the town center.

=== Ethnic composition ===
Ethnic composition —
	2013	1991	1981	1971
Total	2,883 (100,0%)	2,715 (100,0%)	1,693 (100,0%)	943 (100,0%)
Croats	2,737 (94,94%)	963 (35,47%)	609 (35,97%)	433 (45,92%)
Bosniaks	116 (4,024%)	357 (13,15%)	202 (11,93%)	125 (13,26%)
Serbs	23 (0,798%)	1,298 (47,81%)	727 (42,94%)	367 (38,92%)
Others	7 (0,243%)	33 (1,215%)	3 (0,177%)	3 (0,318%)
Yugoslavs		64 (2,357%)	146 (8,624%)	11 (1,166%)
Montenegrins			5 (0,295%)	4 (0,424%)
Slovenes			1 (0,059%)	

=== Religion ===
The town of Kupres has a Roman Catholic church in the parish of the Holy Family and the Ahmed Fazil Paša mosque. both the Roman Catholic church and mosque were destroyed by Serb forces after the Battle of Kupres in 1992.

== Culture ==
Kupres is famous for stećak tombstones. There is one large group of stećak tombstones called Ravanjska vrata and one in Rastičevo. Kupres is also famous for its tumuli—burial mounds. Archaeologists found a grave and a skeleton in one of them. They are believed to be more than 3000 years old and it is now kept in the Gorica museum in Livno.

There is an annual cultural and agricultural fair (the "Strljanica") held in Kupres every first Sunday of July.

The largest cultural institution in the town of Kupres is the Hrvatski dom Kupres ("Croatian house Kupres"), previously known as the "Dom Kulture" ("House of Culture").

=== UNESCO Intangible Cultural Heritage of Humanity ===
Since 2020, the custom of the grass mowing competition in Kupres ("Strljanica") is inscribed as a UNESCO Intangible Cultural Heritage of Humanity. It is the most important social event in the Kupres municipality, and takes place every July. The contest involves the manual mowing of grass using a scythe and is judged by the time, effort and amount mown, as cutting grass at that altitude requires strength and a special technique. The top three mowers are recognized, with the winner treated as a leader who ensures the successful mowing of all the fields to gather hay for the cattle; agriculture and cattle breeding are essential parts of the area’s economy. Men, starting from the age of eighteen, are traditionally the competitors, with the tradition being transmitted within families from father to son. Women rake the grass and prepare food for guests. Other elements linked to the competition include national costumes, the forging of scythes and the preparation of cattle for competitions. Individuals from all ethnic and religious groups in Kupres are free to participate, with the custom being considered as a foundation of the area’s cultural identity, regardless of the people’s background. The bearers themselves and the Kupres Mowers Association are most responsible for safeguarding the tradition.

=== Guinness World Record ===
The largest gathering of people with the same first name (Ivan) is 2,325, and was achieved by Kupreški kosci (Bosnia and Herzegovina) in Kupres, Bosnia and Herzegovina, on 30 July 2017.

== Education ==
Town of Kupres has one elementary school and two highschools.

== Tourism ==
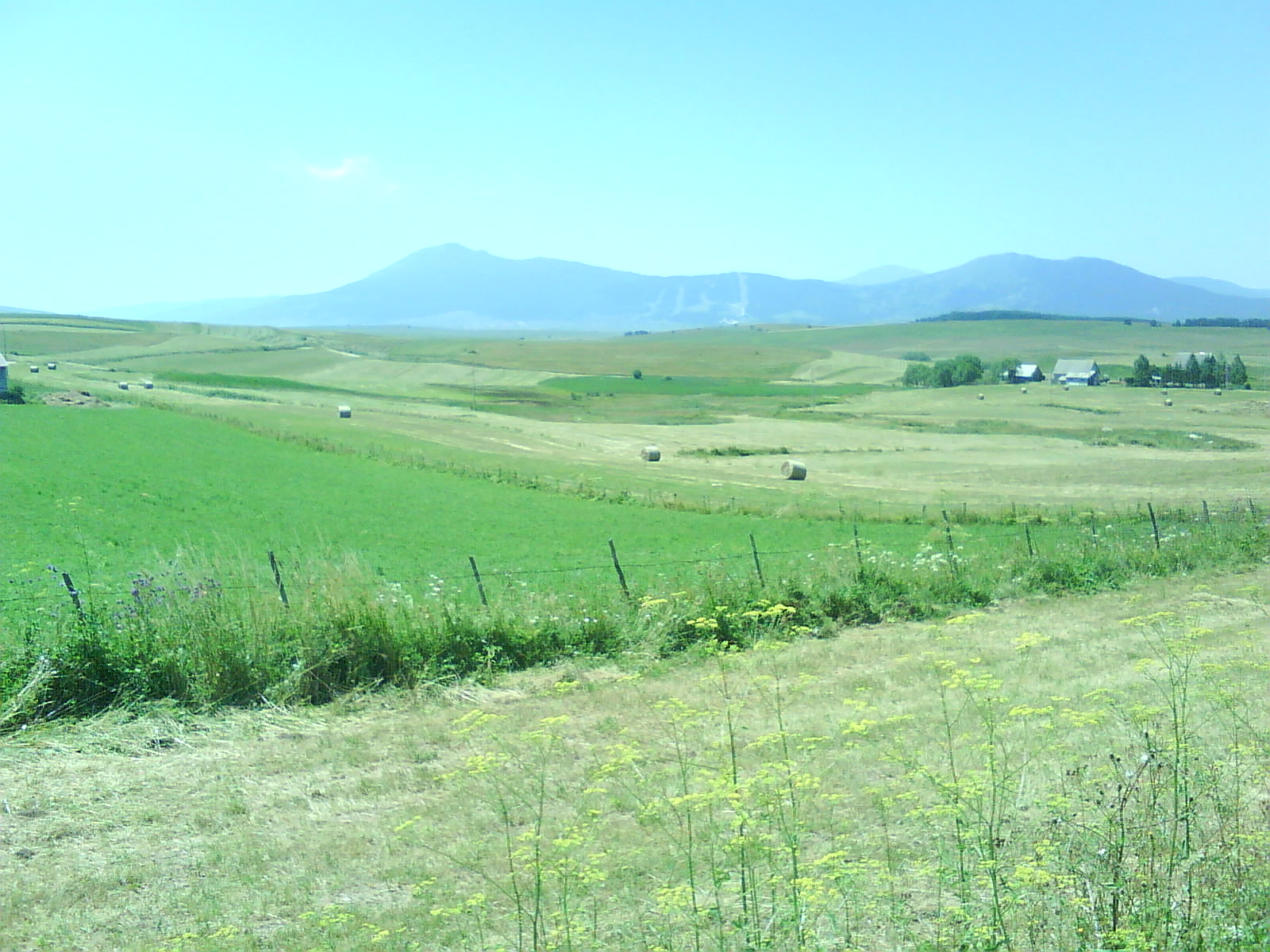
Landscape around city during summer

Kupres is a famous ski resort in Bosnia and Herzegovina, with the majority of visitors coming from Dalmatia and Herzegovina, mostly because of Kupres's proximity to those regions. There are three main ski centers located at the nearby mountains of Čajuša (ski center "Adria ski") and Stožer (ski center "Stožer" & ski center "Ski Ivan").

Kupres is also famous for its active tourism that doesn't include skiing, like motocross, paragliding, horse riding and off-road driving.

The town also has a large natural lake called the "Kukavičko jezero"

== Twin towns – sister cities ==
Kupres is twinned with:

- Baška Voda, Croatia
- Gospić, Croatia
- Kaštela, Croatia
- Valpovo, Croatia

== See also ==
- Tropolje

== Bibliography ==
- Trgo, Fabijan, ed. (1964). Zbornik dokumenata i podataka o Narodno-oslobodilačkom ratu Jugoslovenskih naroda. Vol. V, 32.
