= 204th Vukovar Brigade =

204th Brigade
- Active: September 1991 – June 1992
- Disbanded: 5 June 1992
- Country: Croatia
- Branch: Army
- Type: Infantry
- Nicknames: Vukovarska (The Vukovar Brigade)
- Engagements: Croatian War of Independence; Battle of Vukovar; Clashes in Bogdanovci; Bosnian war; Battle of Kupres

Commanders
- Notable commanders: Mile Dedaković; Branko Borković

The 204th Vukovar Brigade (Croatian: 204. vukovarska brigada) of the Croatian Army was a military unit of the Republic of Croatia that led the defence of the city of Vukovar during the 1991 Battle of Vukovar, in the Croatian War of Independence.

The first Croatian National Guard (Zbor narodne garde, ZNG) units that were active in Vukovar included elements of the 109th Brigade that was first mobilized in late June 1991, a part of the 1st "A" Brigade in July, and the 4th Battalion of the 3rd "A" Brigade formed in the city in August 1991. By the end of September, elements of the 109th stationed in Vukovar started to form the local 204th brigade.

The 204th brigade was formed on September 25, 1991, after having been promulgated by the September 23, 1991, order of general Karl Gorinšek, at the time the commander of the Osijek sector. At the time of its founding, the brigade roster included 1,803 men. It was assigned to cover the area of the former municipality of Vukovar, that included the city of Vukovar, Ilok as well as numerous surrounding villages. The command was also sent to the General Staff in Zagreb, which made some amendments, notably renaming it to the 124th Brigade, that were signed into an order of the Minister of Defence on September 26.

The brigade was not a trained military formation, but it included some trained soldiers and was led by trained officers, first by Mile Dedaković, nicknamed Jastreb ("hawk"), who was previously a lieutenant colonel of the Yugoslav People's Army. A notable commander was Blago Zadro who commanded the 3rd Battalion that defended the city from the northwest on the Trpinja road. Zadro was killed in combat on October 16, 1991. Also in mid-October, Dedaković was reassigned to Vinkovci and the command passed on to Branko Borković, nicknamed Mladi Jastreb ("young hawk"), who previously had the rank of captain.

At its peak it was composed of around 2,200 men, of which around 770 in active combat. A total of 921 soldiers died, 457 went missing in action, 770 were wounded, and 1527 were captured. A total of 5,497 soldiers were part of the brigade over the course of the entire war.

After the fall of Vukovar in late November 1991, the leftovers of the brigade moved to Vinkovci and elsewhere. The brigade commanders never signed an official surrender. The brigade was, however, officially disbanded on June 5, 1992, but its remaining personnel soon moved into the newly formed 5th Guards Brigade, founded on October 25, 1992. The two surviving commanders, Dedaković and Borković, were never promoted, and many of its members were never credited for their valor in combat. Only Blago Zadro was posthumously promoted to Major general.

The verification of the brigade rosters in the Ministry of Defence was delayed until long after the war was over, to the dismay of the brigade's former commanders.

The first lineup of the brigade survivors after the war happened on September 23, 2001, sponsored by a former member and then-Minister of Croatian Defenders Ivica Pančić, as well as the Ministry of Defence under Jozo Radoš.

In November 2005, the Ministry of Defence under Berislav Rončević finally confirmed that the official records were consolidated, which cleared the way for the official recognition of the brigade.

On September 25, 2006, the whole of the brigade was officially lined up at a ceremony in Vukovar under the brigade's now-official banners and before the Commander-in-Chief President of Croatia Stjepan Mesić.

The raw data of the Croatian Defender Registry (Registar hrvatskih branitelja) that was leaked in 2010 lists the names of over 3,300 soldiers from the 204th brigade over the course of the whole war.
