= Bajramovci, Kupres =

Bajramovci Бајрамовци
- Village
- Location within Bosnia and Herzegovina
- Coordinates: 44°03′04″N 17°06′50″E
- Country: Bosnia and Herzegovina
- Entity: Federation of Bosnia and Herzegovina
- Canton: Canton 10
- Municipality: Kupres

Area
  - Total: 18.21 km^{2} (7.03 sq mi)

Population (2013)
  - Total: 12
  - Density: 0.66/km^{2} (1.7/sq mi)
- Time zone: UTC+1 (CET)
  - Summer (DST): UTC+2 (CEST)

Bajramovci (Serbian: Бајрамовци) is a village in the Municipality of Kupres in Canton 10 of the Federation of Bosnia and Herzegovina, an entity of Bosnia and Herzegovina.

== Demographics ==
According to the 2013 census, its population was 12, all Serbs.

== Bibliography ==
- Ethnicity/National Affiliation, Religion and Mother Tongue (PDF). Sarajevo: Agency for Statistics of Bosnia and Herzegovina. 2019.
