= Šemenovci, Kupres, Republika Srpska =

Šemenovci Шеменовци
- Village
- Location within Bosnia and Herzegovina
- Coordinates: 44°05′N 17°08′E
- Country: Bosnia and Herzegovina
- Entity: Federation of Bosnia and Herzegovina
- Municipality: Kupres

Area
  - Total: 20.18 km^{2} (7.79 sq mi)

Population (2013)
  - Total: 106
  - Density: 5.25/km^{2} (13.6/sq mi)
- Time zone: UTC+1 (CET)
  - Summer (DST): UTC+2 (CEST)

Šemenovci (Serbian Cyrillic: Шеменовци) is a village in the Federation of Bosnia and Herzegovina, Bosnia and Herzegovina.

== Demographics ==
According to the 2013 census, its population was 93.
