= Rastičevo, Kupres, Canton 10 =

Rastičevo
- Village
- Location within Bosnia and Herzegovina
- Coordinates: 44°02′47″N 17°13′05″E
- Country: Bosnia and Herzegovina
- Entity: Federation of Bosnia and Herzegovina
- Canton: Canton 10
- Municipality: Kupres

Area
  - Total: 19.48 km^{2} (7.52 sq mi)

Population (2013)
  - Total: 10
  - Density: 0.51/km^{2} (1.3/sq mi)
- Time zone: UTC+1 (CET)
  - Summer (DST): UTC+2 (CEST)

Rastičevo is a village in the Municipality of Kupres in Canton 10 of the Federation of Bosnia and Herzegovina, an entity of Bosnia and Herzegovina.

== Demographics ==
According to the 2013 census, its population was 10.

Ethnicity in 2013
| Ethnicity | Number | Percentage |
|---|---|---|
| Croats | 5 | 50.0% |
| Serbs | 5 | 50.0% |
| Total | 10 | 100% |

== Bibliography ==
- Ethnicity/National Affiliation, Religion and Mother Tongue (PDF). Sarajevo: Agency for Statistics of Bosnia and Herzegovina. 2019.
