= Municipality of Kupres =

Municipality of Kupres Općina Kupres (Croatian)
- Municipality
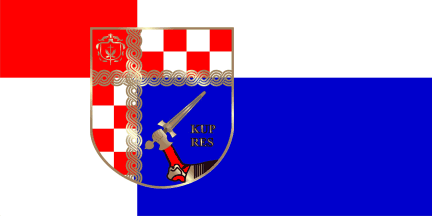
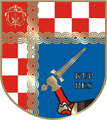
- Flag Coat of arms

- Location of the Municipality of Kupres within Bosnia and Herzegovina
- Country: Bosnia and Herzegovina
- Entity: Federation of Bosnia and Herzegovina
- Canton: Canton 10
- Seat: Kupres

Government
  - Municipal president: Zdravko Mioč (HDZ BiH)

Area
  - Total: 569.8 km^{2} (220.0 sq mi)

Population (2013)
  - Total: 5,057
  - Density: 8.875/km^{2} (22.99/sq mi)
- Demonym: Kupresan
- Website: opcinakupres.ba

Municipality of Kupres (Croatian: Općina Kupres) is a municipality in Canton 10 of the Federation of Bosnia and Herzegovina, an entity of Bosnia and Herzegovina. Its seat is in Kupres. According to the 2013 census, it had a population of 5,057.

== Demographics ==
According to the 2013 census, the population of Kupres was 5,057.

Settlement	Nationality								Total
Settlement	Croats	%	Serbs	%	Bosniaks	%	Others	%	Total
Bajramovci	0	0	12	100	0	0	0	0	12
Begovo Selo	161	98.77	2	1.23	0	0	0	0	163
Bili Potok	36	100	0	0	0	0	0	0	36
Blagaj	0	0	48	100	0	0	0	0	48
Botun	23	85.19	0	0	4	14.81	0	0	27
Brda	0	0	0	0	10	100	0	0	10
Bućovača	0	0	23	100	0	0	0	0	23
Donje Ravno	0	0	43	58.90	30	41.10	0	0	73
Donje Vukovsko	0	0	7	100	0	0	0	0	7
Donji Malovan	1	1.82	54	98.18	0	0	0	0	55
Goravci	140	92.11	0	0	12	7.89	0	0	152
Gornje Ravno	0	0	27	100	0	0	0	0	27
Gornje Vukovsko	0	0	1	100	0	0	0	0	1
Gornji Malovan	12	37.50	30	62.50	0	0	0	0	42
Kudilji	0	0	0	0	0	0	0	0	0
Kukavice	0	0	0	0	11	100	0	0	11
Kupres	2,737	94.94	23	0.80	116	4.02	7	0.24	2,883
Kute	0	0	0	0	51	100	0	0	51
Mlakva	0	0	0	0	0	0	0	0	0
Mrđanovci	0	0	13	100	0	0	0	0	13
Mrđebare	0	0	0	0	0	0	0	0	0
Mušić	0	0	23	100	0	0	0	0	23
Novo Selo	0	0	0	0	0	0	0	0	0
Odžak	215	95.13	0	0	9	3.98	2	0.88	226
Olovo	78	100	0	0	0	0	0	0	78
Osmanlije	375	100	0	0	0	0	0	0	375
Otinovci	142	94.67	0	0	7	4.67	1	0.67	150
Rastičevo	5	50.00	5	50.00	0	0	0	0	10
Rilić	0	0	12	70.59	5	29.41	0	0	17
Šemenovci	0	0	13	100	0	0	0	0	13
Stražbenica	15	100	0	0	0	0	0	0	15
Suhova	2	100	0	0	0	0	0	0	2
Vrila	0	0	0	0	0	0	0	0	0
Zanaglina	0	0	0	0	0	0	0	0	0
Zlosela	392	100	0	0	0	0	0	0	392
Zvirnjača	132	100	0	0	0	0	0	0	132
Municipality	4,474	88.47	318	6.29	255	5.04	10	0.20	5,057

== Bibliography ==
- Ethnicity/National Affiliation, Religion and Mother Tongue (PDF). Sarajevo: Agency for Statistics of Bosnia and Herzegovina. 2019.
