= Šemenovci, Kupres, Canton 10 =

Šemenovci Шеменовци
- Village
- Location within Bosnia and Herzegovina
- Coordinates: 44°05′N 17°08′E
- Country: Bosnia and Herzegovina
- Entity: Federation of Bosnia and Herzegovina
- Canton: Canton 10
- Municipality: Kupres

Area
  - Total: 20.18 km^{2} (7.79 sq mi)

Population (2013)
  - Total: 106
  - Density: 5.25/km^{2} (13.6/sq mi)
- Time zone: UTC+1 (CET)
  - Summer (DST): UTC+2 (CEST)

Šemenovci is a village in the Municipality of Kupres in Canton 10 of the Federation of Bosnia and Herzegovina, an entity of Bosnia and Herzegovina.

== Demographics ==
According to the 2013 census, its population was 13, all Serbs.

== Bibliography ==
- Ethnicity/National Affiliation, Religion and Mother Tongue (PDF). Sarajevo: Agency for Statistics of Bosnia and Herzegovina. 2019.
