= Rilić, Kupres =

Rilić Рилић
- Village
- Location within Bosnia and Herzegovina
- Coordinates: 43°55′N 17°16′E
- Country: Bosnia and Herzegovina
- Entity: Federation of Bosnia and Herzegovina
- Canton: Canton 10
- Municipality: Kupres

Area
  - Total: 20.65 km^{2} (7.97 sq mi)

Population (2013)
  - Total: 17
  - Density: 0.82/km^{2} (2.1/sq mi)
- Time zone: UTC+1 (CET)
  - Summer (DST): UTC+2 (CEST)

Rilić is a village in the Municipality of Kupres in Canton 10 of the Federation of Bosnia and Herzegovina, an entity of Bosnia and Herzegovina.

== Demographics ==
According to the 2013 census, its population was 17.

Ethnicity in 2013
Ethnicity	Number	Percentage
Serbs	12	70.6%
Bosniaks	5	29.4%
Total	17	100%

== Bibliography ==
- Ethnicity/National Affiliation, Religion and Mother Tongue (PDF). Sarajevo: Agency for Statistics of Bosnia and Herzegovina. 2019.
