= Gornji Malovan =

- Village
- Location within Bosnia and Herzegovina
- Coordinates: 43°56′N 17°12′E
- Country: Bosnia and Herzegovina
- Entity: Federation of Bosnia and Herzegovina
- Canton: Canton 10
- Municipality: Kupres

Area
  - Total: 27.92 km^{2} (10.78 sq mi)

Population (2013)
  - Total: 32
  - Density: 1.1/km^{2} (3.0/sq mi)
- Time zone: UTC+1 (CET)
  - Summer (DST): UTC+2 (CEST)

Gornji Malovan is a village in the Municipality of Kupres in Canton 10 of the Federation of Bosnia and Herzegovina, an entity of Bosnia and Herzegovina.

== Demographics ==
According to the 2013 census, its population was 32.

Ethnicity in 2013
Ethnicity	Number	Percentage
Croats	20	62.5%
Serbs	12	37.5%
Total	32	100%

== Bibliography ==
- Ethnicity/National Affiliation, Religion and Mother Tongue (PDF). Sarajevo: Agency for Statistics of Bosnia and Herzegovina. 2019.
