= Donji Malovan =

- Village
- Location within Bosnia and Herzegovina
- Coordinates: 43°54′N 17°12′E
- Country: Bosnia and Herzegovina
- Entity: Federation of Bosnia and Herzegovina
- Canton: Canton 10
- Municipality: Kupres

Area
  - Total: 38.92 km^{2} (15.03 sq mi)

Population (2013)
  - Total: 55
  - Density: 1.4/km^{2} (3.7/sq mi)
- Time zone: UTC+1 (CET)
  - Summer (DST): UTC+2 (CEST)

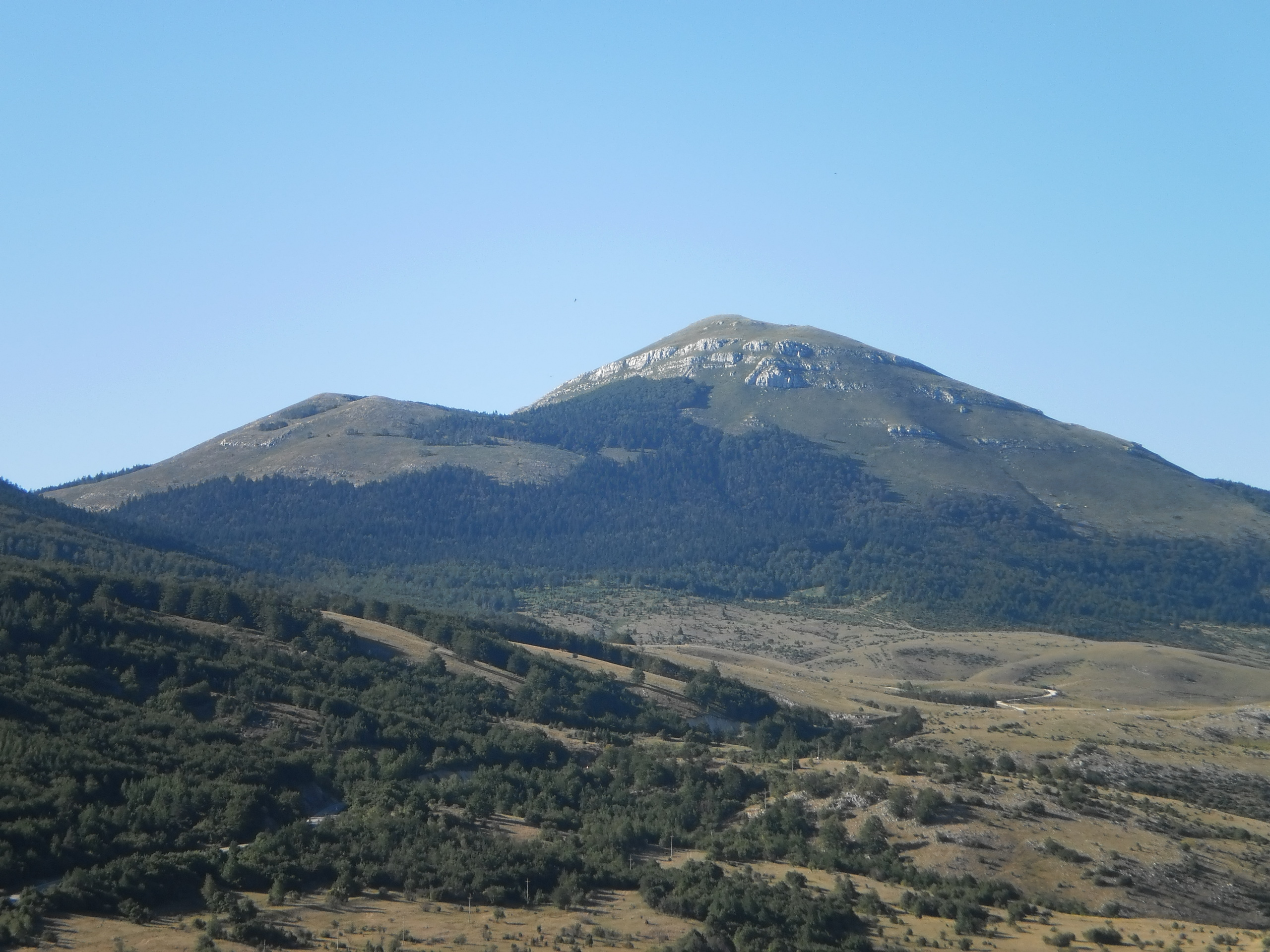
Malovan mountain

Donji Malovan is a village in the Municipality of Kupres in Canton 10 of the Federation of Bosnia and Herzegovina, an entity of Bosnia and Herzegovina.

== Demographics ==
According to the 2013 census, its population was 55.

Ethnicity in 2013
Ethnicity	Number	Percentage
Serbs	54	98.2%
Croats	1	1.8%
Total	55	100%

== Bibliography ==
- Ethnicity/National Affiliation, Religion and Mother Tongue (PDF). Sarajevo: Agency for Statistics of Bosnia and Herzegovina. 2019.
