= Republika Srpska =

Political entity of Bosnia and Herzegovina

Republika Srpska Република Српска
- Entity of Bosnia and Herzegovina
- Flag Emblem
- Anthem: Моја Република; Moja Republika "My Republic"
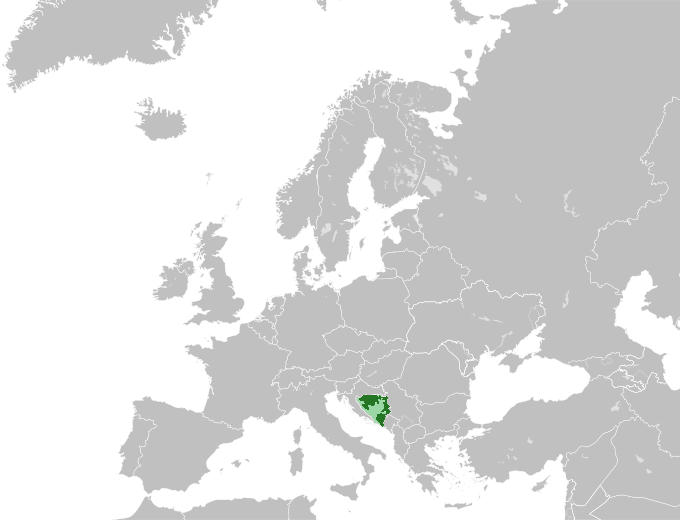
- Republika Srpska within Europe Rest of Bosnia and Herzegovina

- Republika Srpska within Bosnia and Herzegovina, with the Brčko District (dashed) between the two parts
- Country: Bosnia and Herzegovina
- Proclaimed: 9 January 1992
- Recognised as part of Bosnia and Herzegovina: 14 December 1995
- Capital: Sarajevo (de jure); Banja Luka (de facto)
- Largest city: Banja Luka
- Official languages: Serbian; Bosnian; Croatian^{a}
- Ethnic groups: 83.0% Serbs; 12.7% Bosniaks; 2.3% Croats; 2.1% others
- Religion: 82.8% Eastern Orthodoxy; 12.8% Islam; 2.2% Catholicism; 2.1% others
- Government: Unitary parliamentary republic (Note: In contrast with the federal Federation of Bosnia and Herzegovina, Republica Srpska acts as a unitary state void of federalism, with high centralisation in the government.)
  - President: Savo Minić
  - Prime Minister: Anđelka Kuzmić (acting)
  - Speaker of the National Assembly: Nenad Stevandić
- Legislature: National Assembly

Area
  - Total: 24,641 km^{2} (9,514 sq mi)

Population
  - 2025 estimate: ▼1,105,496
  - 2013 census: ▼1,170,342
  - Density: 45.2/km^{2} (117.1/sq mi)
- GDP (nominal): 2025 estimate
  - Total: ▲$10.779 billion
  - Per capita: ▲$9,751
- HDI (2023): ▲0.801 very high
- Currency: Convertible mark (BAM)
- Time zone: UTC+02:00 (+01:00)
- Date format: dd/mm/yyyy
- Driving side: Right
- Calling code: +387
- ISO 3166 code: BA-SRP
- ^{a}The Constitution of Republika Srpska avoids naming "Serbian, Bosnian, and Croatian", instead listing them as "the language of the Serb people, the language of the Bosniak people and the language of the Croat people" due to the ongoing debate over the separation of these languages.

Republika Srpska (Serbian Cyrillic: Република Српска [repǔblika sr̩̂pskaː]; lit. 'Serb Republic'), or the Republic of Srpska, is one of the two political entities of Bosnia and Herzegovina, the other being the Federation of Bosnia and Herzegovina. Situated in the northern and eastern regions of the country, it recorded a population of 1,228,423 in the 2013 census. Its administrative centre and largest city is Banja Luka, located on the banks of the Vrbas River.

Republika Srpska was established in 1992 at the onset of the Bosnian War with the stated purpose of safeguarding the interests of the Serbs of Bosnia and Herzegovina. During the conflict, a majority of Croats and Bosniaks were expelled from territories controlled by Republika Srpska, while the majority of Serbs were displaced or expelled from the present-day Federation of Bosnia and Herzegovina to Republika Srpska. The 1995 Dayton Agreement created Republika Srpska as one of Bosnia and Herzegovina's two constituent entities. Today, it is inhabited by most of the Serb population of the country.

Republika Srpska enjoys one of the broadest sets of prerogatives and competencies of any subnational entity in Europe, with powers that in many respects resemble those of a sovereign state rather than a purely subnational entity. It operates under a parliamentary system, with legislative power vested in the National Assembly, which comprises 83 seats. Republika Srpska is administratively divided into 64 municipalities, known as opštine (singular: opština).

== Name ==
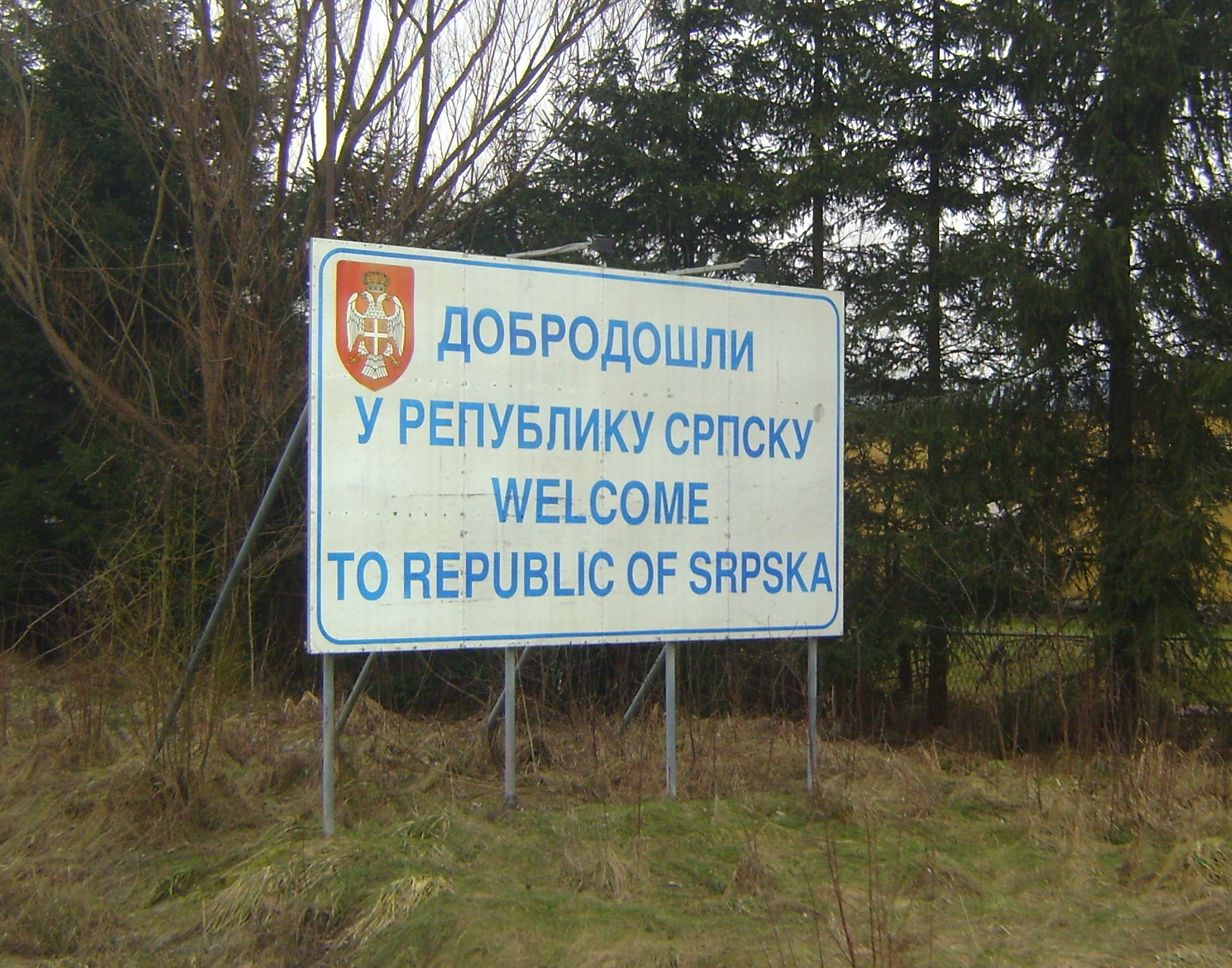
Welcome sign on the administrative line with the Federation of Bosnia and Herzegovina

In the name Republika Srpska, Srpska is a noun derived from the ethnonym of the Serbs with a different suffix from Srbija 'Serbia'. In Serbian, many names of countries are formed with the -sk- suffix (e.g. Bugarska 'Bulgaria', Danska 'Denmark', Finska 'Finland', Hrvatska 'Croatia', Irska 'Ireland', Turska 'Turkey'). An analogous English formation would be Serbland (used sporadically). The government uses the name "Republic of Srpska" in English.

Although Republika Srpska is variously glossed in English as "Serb Republic", "Bosnian Serb Republic", or "Republic of Srpska", the Constitution of Bosnia and Herzegovina and English-language news sources such as the BBC, The New York Times, and The Guardian generally refer to the entity by its transliteration.

According to Glas Srpske, a Banja Luka daily, the modern entity's name was created by its first minister of culture, Ljubomir Zuković.

== History ==
=== Early history ===
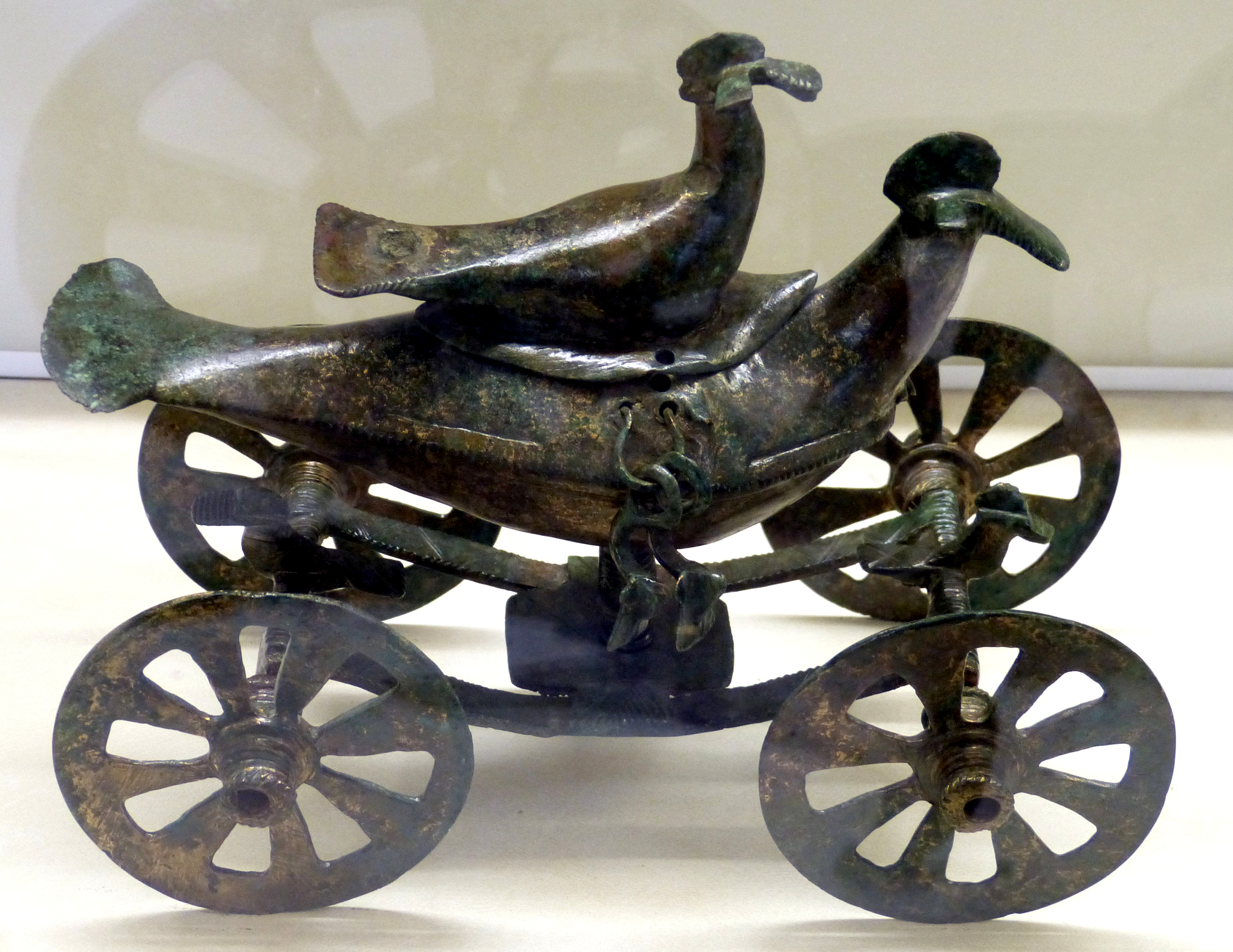
Iron Age cult carriage from Banjani near Sokolac

Archaeological evidence in Republika Srpska attest to pronounced human activity in the Paleolithic. Within the wider region of Herzegovina, the discoveries tie the region's early activities to Croatia and Montenegro.

More permanent settlement arose with the Neolithic, which occurred along the rivers of Bosnia and Herzegovina as farming spread from the southeast. The Butmir culture developed near present-day East Sarajevo on the river Bosna. A variety of idols, mostly of female characters, were found in the Butmir site, along with dugouts.

The Indo-European migrations of the Bronze Age contributed to the first use of metal tools in the region, along with the construction of burial mounds—tumuli, or kurgans. Remains of these mounds can be found in northwestern Bosnia near Prijedor, testament to not only denser settlement but also Bronze Age relics.

With the influx of the Iron Age, the Glasinac culture, developing near Sokolac in eastern Republika Srpska, was one of the most important of the country's long-standing Indo-European inhabitants, the Illyrians. Later, these Illyrians—the Autariatae—were influenced by the Celts after the Gallic invasion of the Balkans.

=== Roman period ===
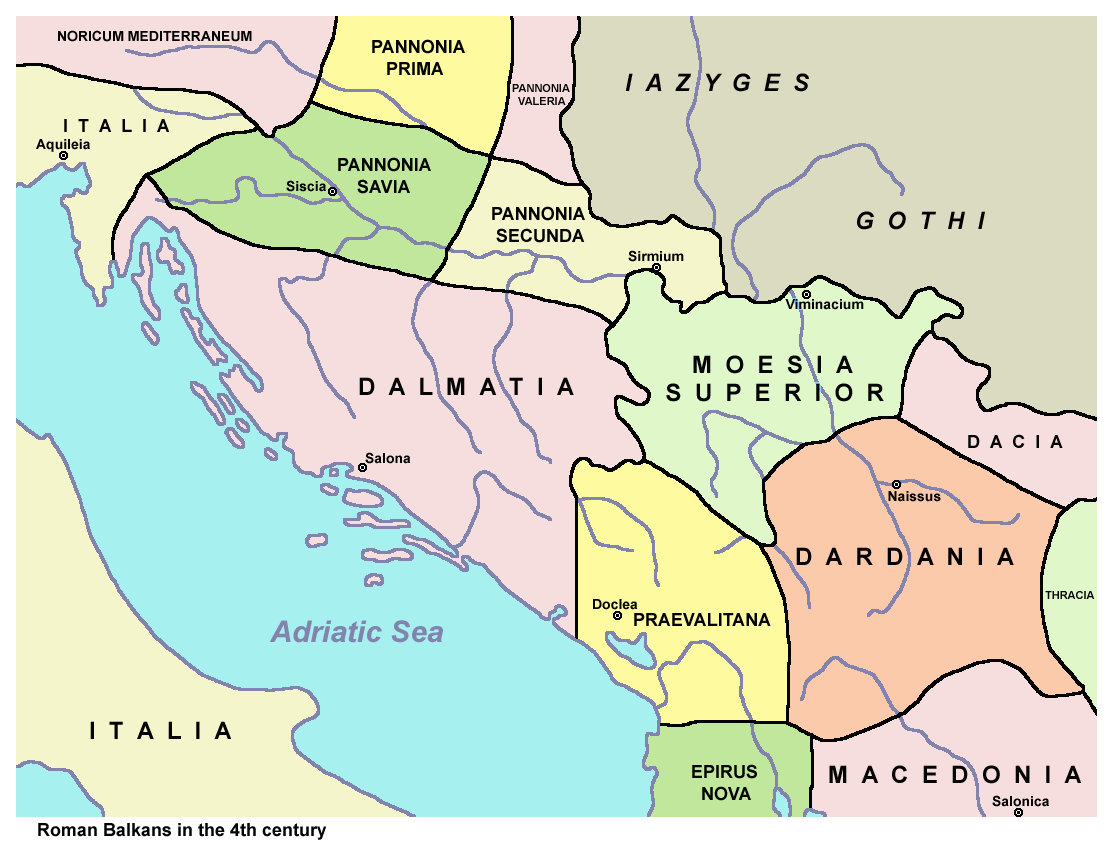
Territory of Republika Srpska within the Roman Empire, 4th century

With the end of the Illyrian Wars, most of Bosnia and Herzegovina came under Roman control within the province of Illyricum. In this period, the Romans consolidated the region through the construction of a dense road network and the Romanisation of the local population. Among these roads was the Via Argentaria, or 'Silver Way', which transported silver from the eastern mines of Bosnia to Roman population centres. Modern placenames, such as the Una and Sana rivers in the northwest, have Latin origins, meaning "the one" and "the healthy", respectively. This rule was not uninterrupted, however, with the suppression of the once-dominant Illyrian population came revolts such as the Bellum Batonianum. After 20 AD, however, the entire country was conquered by the Romans, and it was split between Pannonia and Dalmatia. The most prominent Roman city in Bosnia was the relatively small Servitium, near modern-day Gradiška in the northern part of the entity.

Christianity spread to the region relatively late at least partially due to the countryside's mountainous nature and its lack of large settlements. In the fourth century, however, the country began to be Christianised en masse. With the split of the Western and Eastern Roman Empires in 395, modern-day Republika Srpska fell under the Western Roman Empire. Testament to its and Bosnia and Herzegovina's later religious polarisation, it was conquered as a frontier of the Eastern Roman Empire, a harbinger of the religious division to come.

=== Middle Ages ===
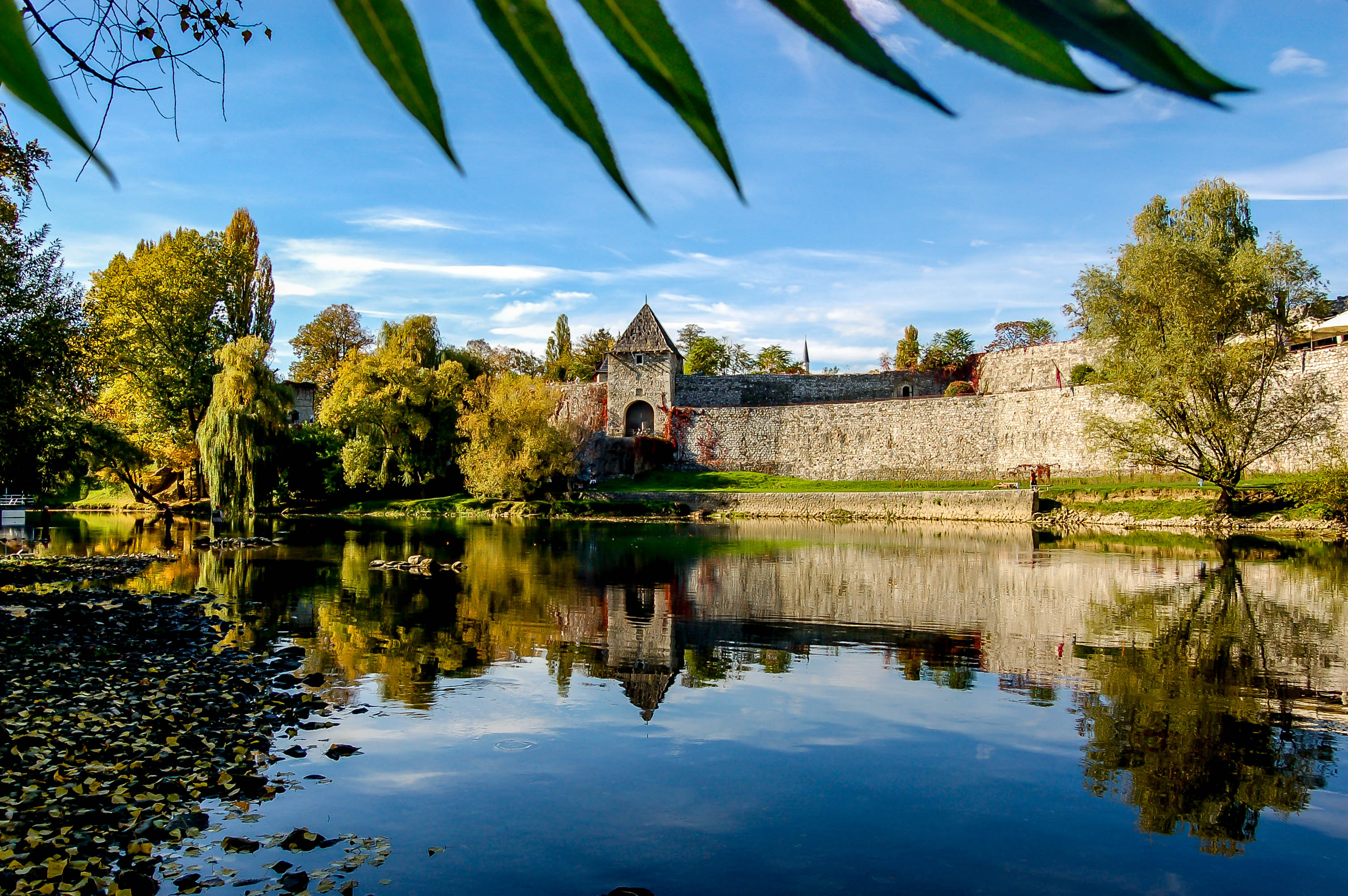
Kastel Fortress in Banja Luka, first appearing as an early Slavic hillfort or gradina

With the loosening of the Roman grip on the region came the Migration Period, which, given Republika Srpska's position in southeastern Europe, involved a wide variety of peoples. Among the first was the invasion of Germanic peoples from the east and north, and the territory became a part of the Ostrogothic Kingdom in 476.

By 535, the territory was taken once again by the Byzantine Empire. At this time, the Empire's grip was once again relatively loose, and Slavs invaded the surrounding area. Modern-day Republika Srpska was therefore split between the mediaeval Kingdom of Croatia and, according to De Administrando Imperio, mediaeval Serbian županije, including, Bosna, Zachlumia, Travunija, and Serbia, then including land in eastern Bosnia. Parts of present-day Srpska were locations of settlement of the original White Serb people.

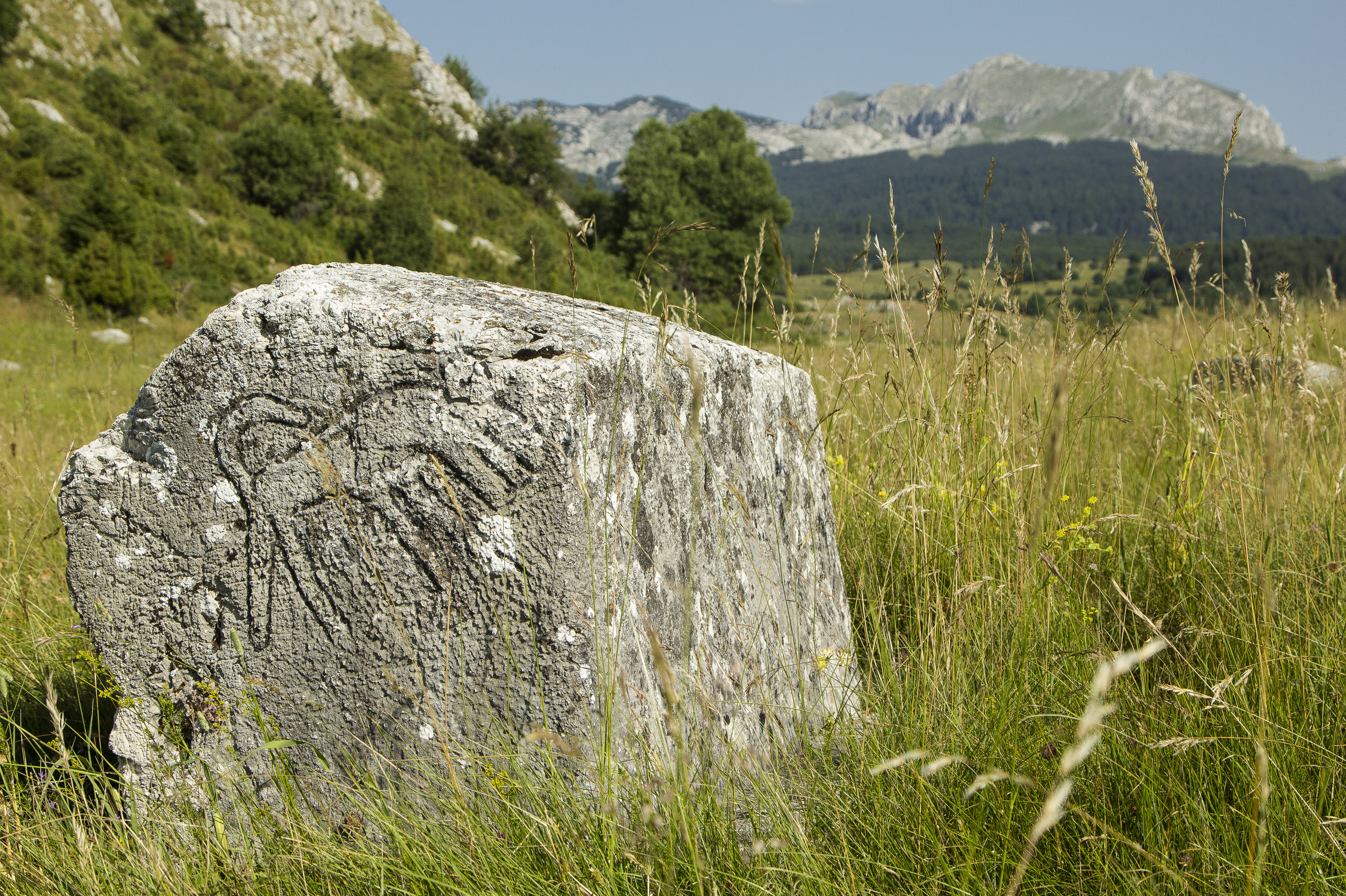
Stećak, a UNESCO World Heritage Site, on Treskavica mountain

By the end of the 11th century, the entirety of Bosnia became part of the Hungarian Crown Lands. Under Hungarian rule, the area was known as the Banate of Bosnia. Later, however, under the rule of Ban Kulin, regarded as the founder of Bosnia, the region became de facto independent. In 1377, the Banate of Bosnia became the medieval Kingdom of Bosnia, under Tvrtko I of House of Kotromanić. The capitals of the kingdom were all located in its centre, while the northern periphery remained under nominal Hungarian rule as the region of Usora. Architectural legacies from this period include Kastel Fortress in Banja Luka, the fortress of Doboj as well as castles, churches, and monasteries across the country.

With the growth of the Ottoman Empire, Stefan Tomašević, the last Kotromanić ruler, surrendered Bosnia and Serbia to Ottoman tributary status. A Catholic, he was unpopular among the Orthodox population of Serbia, as well as the members of the Bosnian Church. Refusing to pay tribute to Mehmed the Conqueror, King Stefan was executed and much of Bosnia fell under direct Ottoman rule in 1463 as the Eyalet of Bosnia. The entirety of the country fell in 1482, with the founding of the Sanjak of Herzegovina.

=== 16th to 19th centuries ===
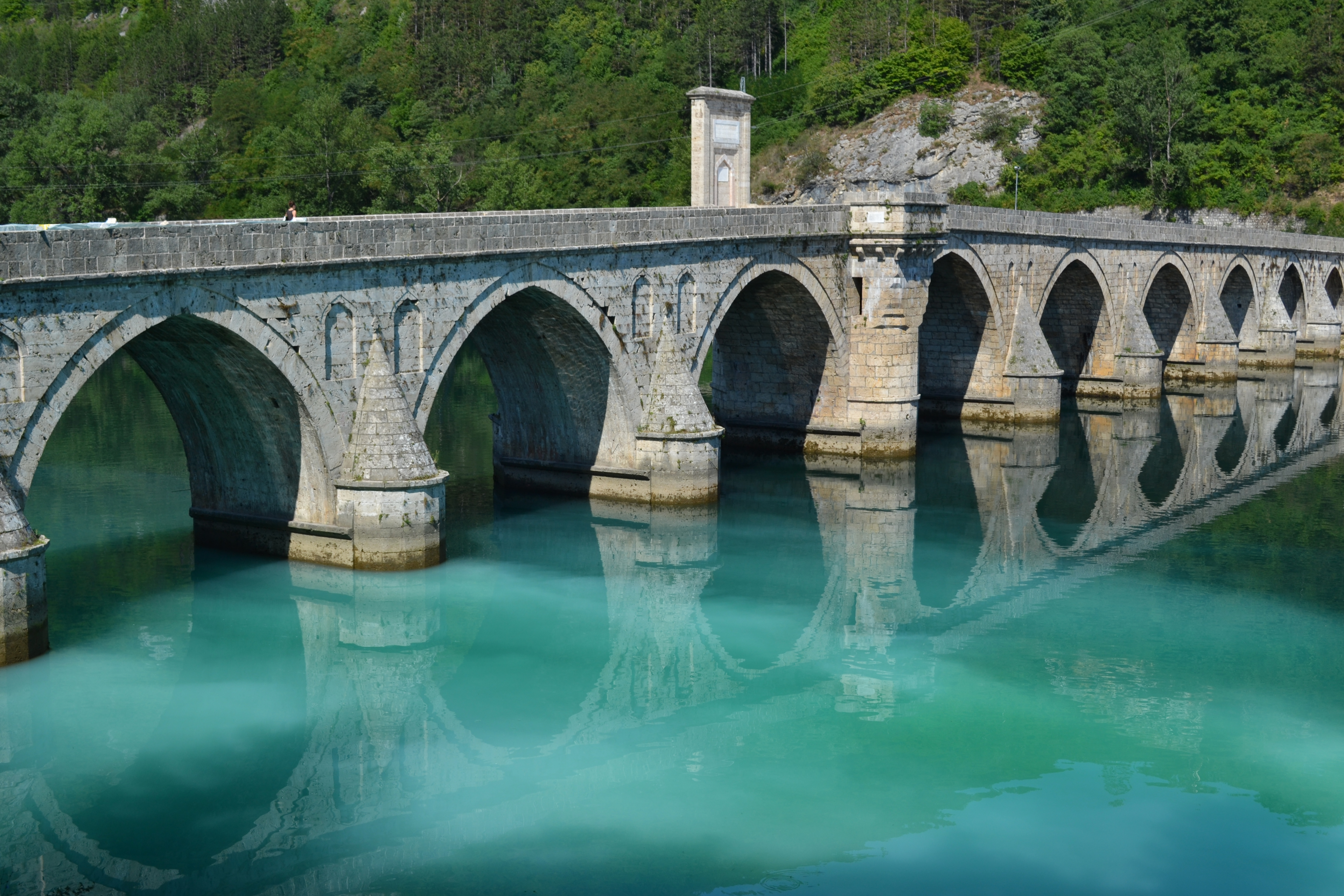
Mehmed Paša Sokolović Bridge, a UNESCO World Heritage Site, in Višegrad, founded by Ottoman Grand vizier of Serb origin Sokollu Mehmed Pasha

Ottoman rule in modern-day Republika Srpska saw another addition to its religious fabric—Islam. Members of the Bosnian Church, as well as many Orthodox and Catholic Bosnians, gradually converted to Islam. Ottoman rule left a profound architectural legacy in Bosnia and Herzegovina and Republika Srpska. The most famous mosque from this period is the Ferhadija mosque, located in Banja Luka. In addition, the subject of Ivo Andrić's book The Bridge on the Drina, Mehmed Paša Sokolović Bridge in Višegrad, was constructed by Mimar Sinan, the most famous Ottoman architect, in 1577, for Grand Vizier Sokollu Mehmed Pasha. Years earlier, the same Grand Vizier was born into an Orthodox family in a small town in Bosnia and taken from his parents as a child for upbringing as a janissary. His bridge is a symbol of the religious and cultural spans—and eventually conflict— that characterise Republika Srpska and Bosnia and Herzegovina.

With the Ottoman-Habsburg conflicts of the late 17th and 18th centuries, parts of northern Republika Srpska became a part of the Habsburg Empire for relatively short periods. The rule was more permanent following the Austro-Hungarian invasion in 1878. Characterised by economic and social development not seen in the by-then backwards Ottoman Empire, Austro-Hungarian rule was welcomed by many. However, many Muslims left Bosnia, leaving Serbs as the majority in the entirety of the Condominium.

=== 20th century ===
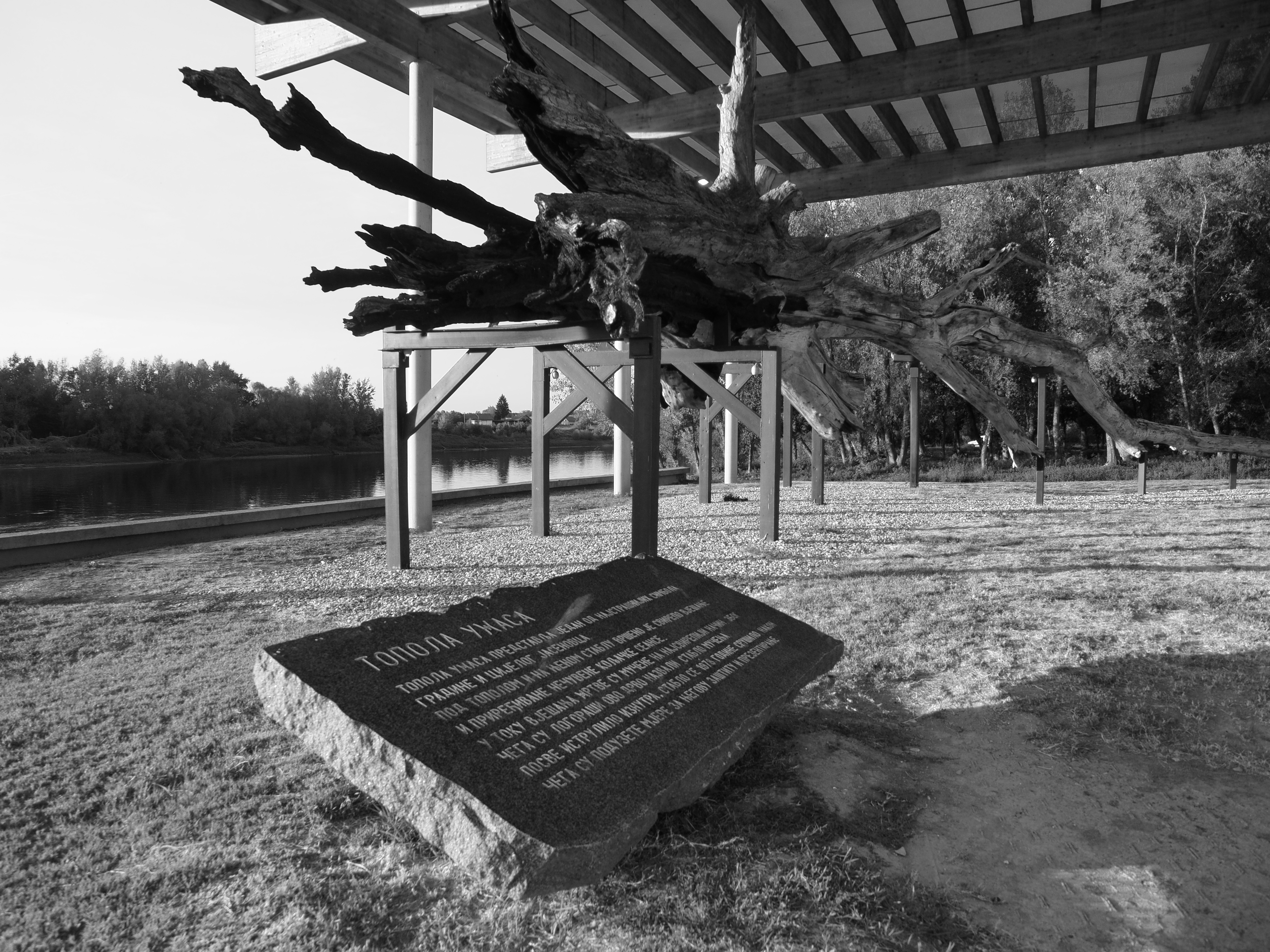
The Poplar of horror in the Jasenovac Memorial Site, one of the key sites in the Genocide of Serbs, in which tens of thousands of Bosnian Serb civilians were brutally killed

With the assassination of Archduke Franz Ferdinand of Austria, carried out by Bosnian Serb Gavrilo Princip, a member of the Yugoslavist Mlada Bosna, World War I broke out in 1914. Following the war, the territory of modern-day Republika Srpska was incorporated into the Vrbas, Drina, and Zeta banovinas of the Kingdom of Serbs, Croats, and Slovenes, renamed Yugoslavia in 1929.

Following the outbreak of World War II and the invasion of Yugoslavia in 1941, modern-day Republika Srpska fell under the rule of the Nazi puppet state, The Independent State of Croatia. Around 300,000 Serbs are estimated to have died under the Ustashe regime as a result of their genocide campaign; a slew of massacres, as well as the use of a variety of concentration and extermination camps, took place in Republika Srpska during the war. The Jasenovac concentration camp, located in modern-day Croatia, was the site of the deaths of some 100,000 people, about 47,000-52,000 of which were Serbs. Massacres also occurred at Garavice and Kruščica concentration camp in the eastern part of Bosnia. The regime systematically and brutally massacred Serbs in villages in the countryside, using a variety of tools. The scale of the violence meant that approximately every sixth Serb living in Bosnia-Herzegovina was the victim of a massacre and virtually every Serb had a family member that was killed in the war, mostly by the Ustaše. An estimated 209,000 Serbs or 16.9% of its Bosnia population were killed on the territory of Bosnia–Herzegovina during the war. Today, monuments honouring these victims can be found across Republika Srpska and Bosnia and Herzegovina.

The Yugoslav royalist and Serbian nationalist movement Chetniks, a guerilla force that engaged in tactical or selective collaboration with the occupying forces for almost all of the war, pursued genocide against Croats and Muslims, which included thousands of Croat and Muslim civilians killed on the territory of modern-day Republika Srpska. The Chetniks killed an estimated 50,000 to 68,000 Muslims and Croats. A December 1941 directive, attributed to Chetnik leader Draža Mihailović, explicitly ordered the ethnic cleansing of Muslims and Croats from Sandžak and Bosnia and Herzegovina. About 300 villages and small towns were destroyed, along with a large number of mosques and Catholic churches. The Chetniks were almost exclusively made up of Serbs except for a large number of Montenegrins who identified as Serbs.

During the entire course of World War II in Yugoslavia, 64.1% of all Bosnian Partisans were Serbs.

After World War II came a period of relative peace and economic development. Ljubija mine and companies like Agrokomerc played a vital role in much of the economic development of the Socialist Republic of Bosnia and Herzegovina. Literacy rates increased greatly, and the University of Banja Luka was founded in 1975.

=== Bosnian War ===
==== Bosnian War and the proclamation of the Republika Srpska ====
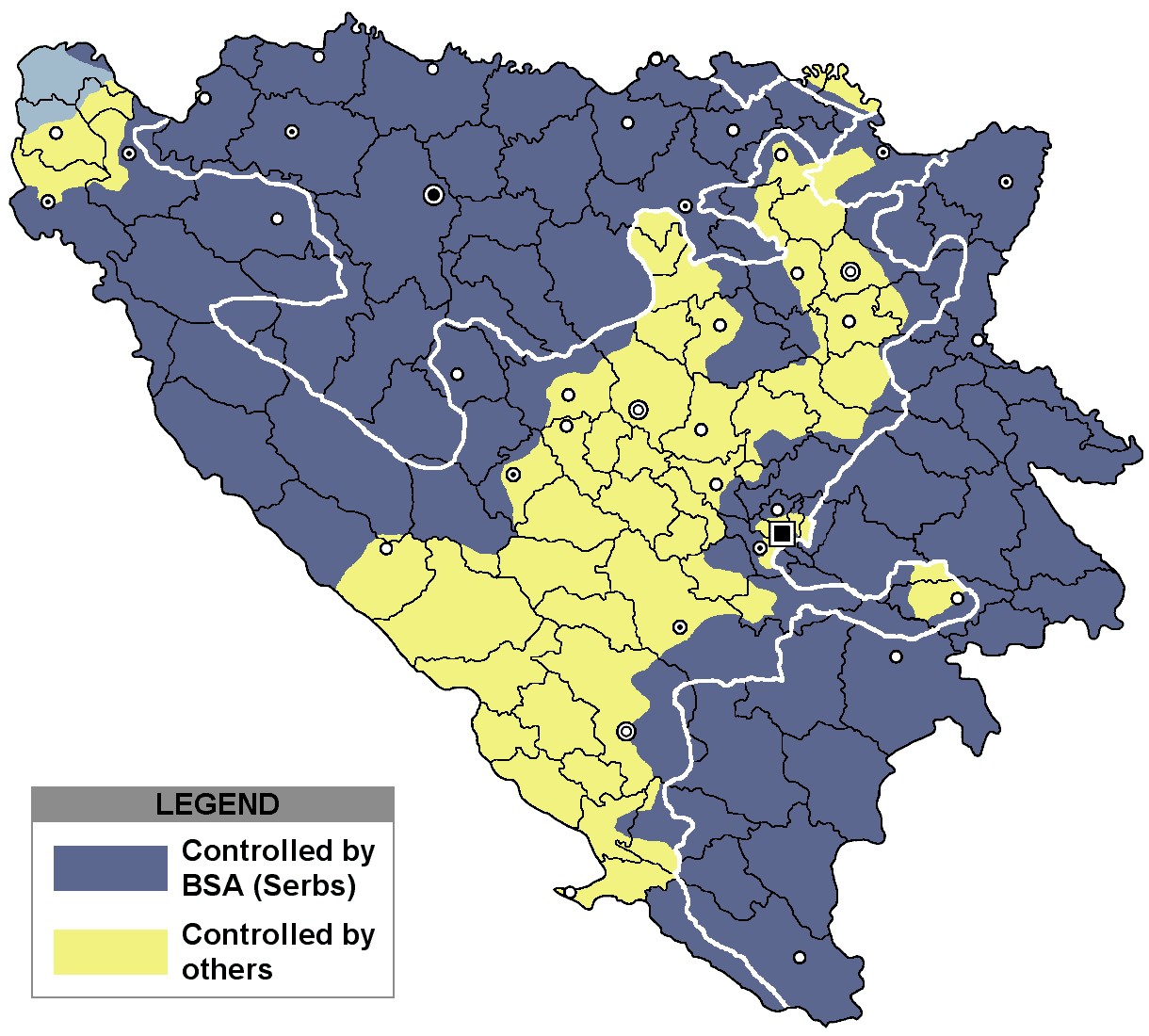
Territories which were controlled by Army of Republika Srpska during the war at its greatest extent (around 1993) compared with current borders.

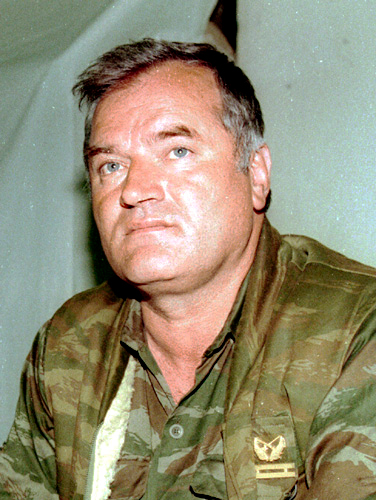
Biljana Plavšić, former president of Republika Srpska, and Ratko Mladić, former Commander of the Army of Republika Srpska. Mladić was found guilty of numerous atrocity crimes (including genocide) by the ICTY. Plavšić pleaded guilty at the ICTY to one count of persecution as a crime against humanity.

Representatives of main political parties and some other national organisations and institutions of Serb people in Bosnia and Herzegovina met on 13 October 1990 in Banja Luka and formed the 'Serbian National Council of Bosnia and Herzegovina' as a Serb political body. In a session on 14–15 October 1991, the People's Assembly of Bosnia and Herzegovina, then part of the Socialist Federal Republic of Yugoslavia, approved the 'Memorandum on Sovereignty', as had already been done by Slovenia and Croatia, as a way to proclaim independence from the rest of Yugoslavia. The memorandum was adopted despite opposition from 83 Serb deputies belonging to the Serb Democratic Party (most of the Serb parliamentary representatives) as well as the Serbian Renewal Movement and the Union of Reform Forces, who regarded the move as illegal.

On 24 October 1991, the Serb deputies formed the Assembly of the Serb People in Bosnia and Herzegovina (Skupština srpskog naroda u Bosni i Hercegovini) to be the highest representative and legislative body of the Bosnian Serb population, ending the tripartite coalition.

The Union of Reform Forces soon ceased to exist, but its members remained in the assembly as the Independent Members of Parliament Caucus. The assembly undertook to address the achievement of equality between the Serbs and other peoples and the protection of the Serbs' interests, which they contended had been jeopardised by decisions of the Bosnian parliament. On 9 January 1992, the assembly proclaimed the Republic of the Serb People of Bosnia and Herzegovina (Republika srpskoga naroda Bosne i Hercegovine), declaring it part of Yugoslavia.

On 28 February 1992, the assembly adopted the Constitution of the Serbian Republic of Bosnia and Herzegovina (the name adopted instead of the previous Republika srpskog naroda Bosne i Hercegovine), which would include districts, municipalities, and regions where Serbs were the majority and also those where they had allegedly become a minority because of persecution during World War II. The republic was part of Yugoslavia and could enter into union with political bodies representing other peoples of Bosnia and Herzegovina.

The Bosnian parliament, without its Serb deputies, held a referendum on the independence of Bosnia and Herzegovina on 29 February and 1 March 1992, but most Serbs boycotted it since the assembly had previously (9–10 November 1991) held a plebiscite in the Serb regions, 96% having opted for membership of the Yugoslav federation formed by Serbia and Montenegro. The referendum had a 64% turnout and 92.7% or 99% (according to different sources) voted for independence. On 6 March the Bosnian parliament promulgated the results of the referendum, proclaiming the republic's independence from Yugoslavia. The republic's independence was recognised by the European Community on 6 April 1992 and by the United States on 7 April. On the same day the Serbs' assembly in session in Banja Luka declared a severance of governmental ties with Bosnia and Herzegovina. The name Republika Srpska was adopted on 12 August 1992.

The political controversy escalated into the Bosnian War, which would last until the autumn of 1995.

The war was ended by the General Framework Agreement for Peace in Bosnia and Herzegovina, reached at Wright-Patterson Air Force Base near Dayton, Ohio, on 21 November and formally signed in Paris on 14 December 1995. Annex 4 of the Agreement is the current Constitution of Bosnia and Herzegovina, which recognises Republika Srpska as one of its two main political-territorial divisions and defines the governmental functions and powers of the two entities. The boundary lines between the entities were delineated in Annex 2 of the Agreement.

Between 1992 and 2008, the Constitution of Republika Srpska was amended 121 times. Article 1 states that Republika Srpska is a territorially unified, indivisible, and inalienable constitutional and legal entity that shall perform its constitutional, legislative, executive, and judicial functions independently.

=== Impact of war ===
The war in Bosnia and Herzegovina resulted in major changes in the country, some of which were quantified in a 1998 UNESCO report. Some two million people, about half the country's population, were displaced. In 1996, there were some 435,346 ethnic Serb refugees from the Federation in Republika Srpska, while another 197,925 had gone to Serbia. In 1991, 27% of the non-agricultural labour force was unemployed in Bosnia, and this number increased due to the war. By 2009, the unemployment rate in Bosnia and Herzegovina was estimated at 29%, according to the CIA's The World Factbook. Republika Srpska's population of Serbs had increased by 547,741 due to the influx of ethnic Serb refugees from the Federation of Bosnia and Herzegovina and the former unrecognised state of the Republic of Serbian Krajina in the new Republic of Croatia.

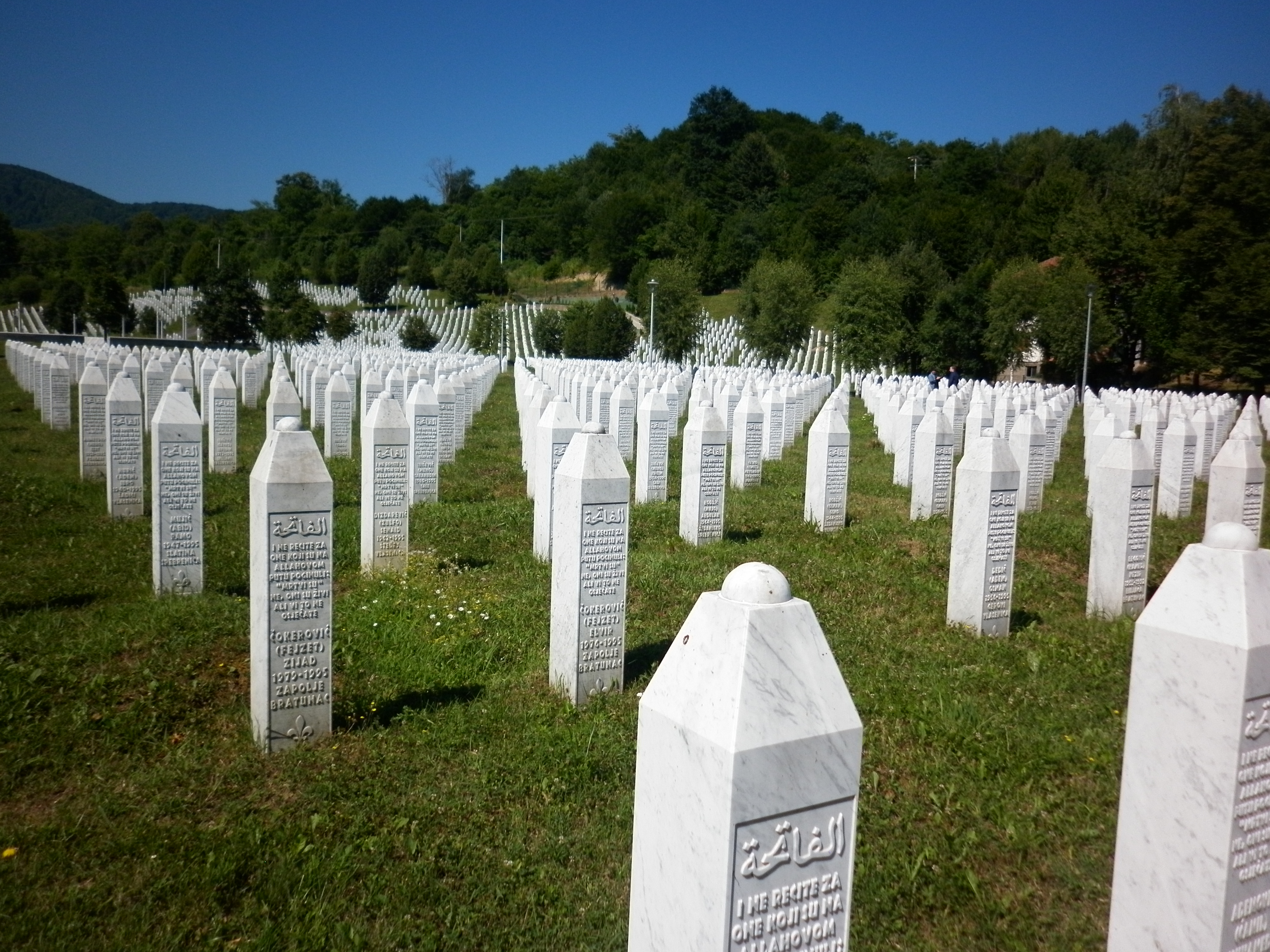
Srebrenica Genocide Memorial

In Eastern Bosnia, Bosnian Serbs besieged the town of Srebrenica, among others. Srebrenica was declared a UN 'Safe Area' in 1993, and it served as an enclave for Muslim refugees for the final years of the Bosnian War. In the middle of July 1995, more than 8,000 Muslim Bosniaks, mainly men and boys, in and around the town of Srebrenica, were killed in what became known as the Srebrenica massacre, which was subsequently designated as an act of genocide by the International Criminal Tribunal for the former Yugoslavia and the International Court of Justice.

Acts of ethnic cleansing against the non-Serb populations reduced the numbers of other groups. Serb police, soldiers, and irregulars attacked Muslims and Croats and burned and looted their homes. Some were killed on the spot; others were rounded up and killed elsewhere or forced to flee. The number of Croats was reduced by 114,593 (the majority of the Croatian pre-war population), and the number of Bosniaks by some 268,907. Some 136,000 of approximately 496,000 Bosniak refugees forced to flee the territory of what is now Republika Srpska have since returned home.

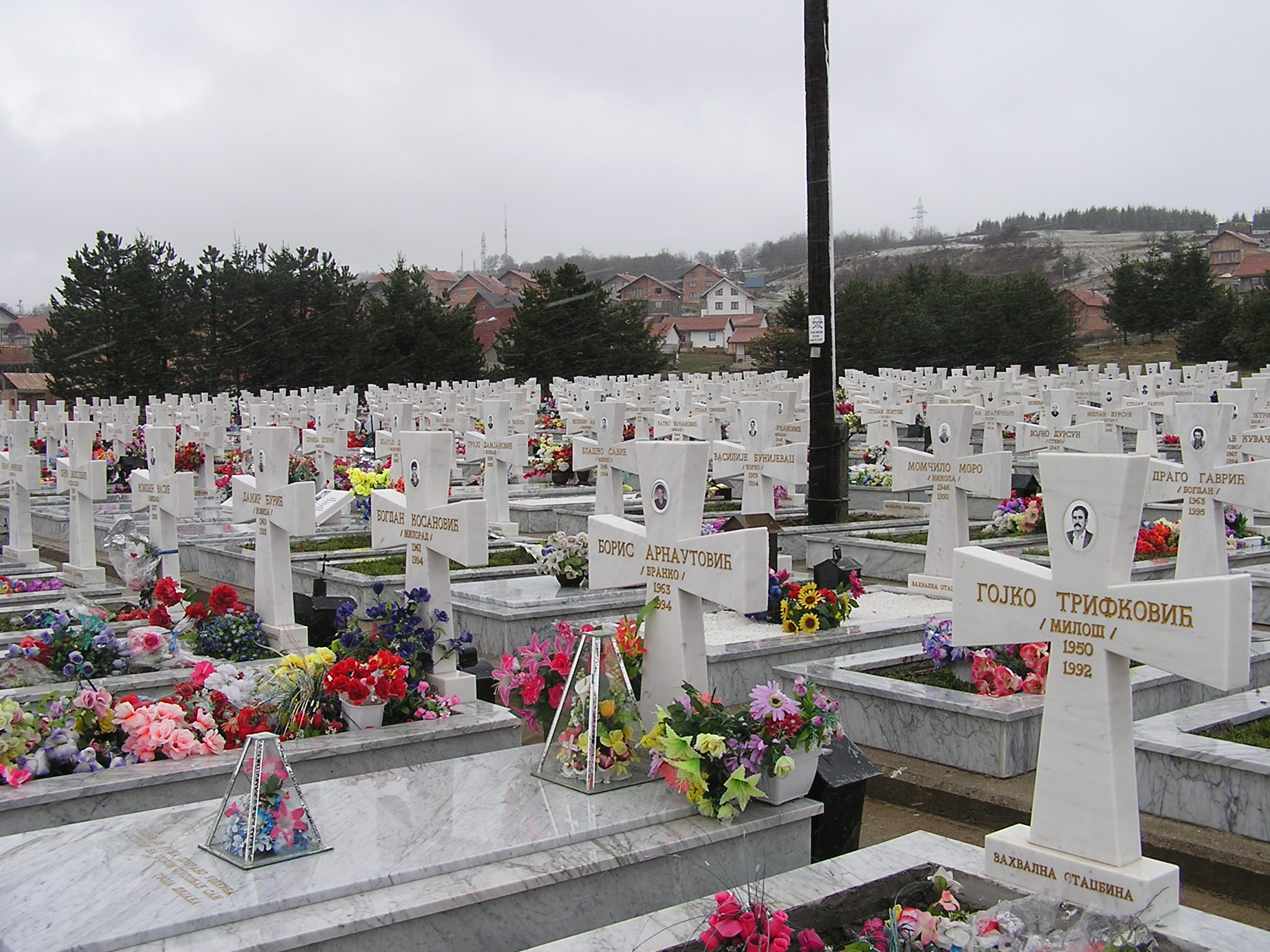
A Serbian cemetery for the victims of the war in Bratunac

As of 2008, 40% of Bosniaks and 8.5% of Croats had returned to Republika Srpska, while 14% of Serbs who left their homes in territories controlled by Bosniaks or Croats also returned to their pre-war communities.

In the early 2000s, NGOs and the Helsinki Commission alleged discrimination against non-Serbs. The International Crisis Group reported in 2002 that in some parts of Republika Srpska a non-Serb returnee is ten times more likely to be the victim of violent crime than a local Serb. The Helsinki Commission, in a 2001 statement on 'Tolerance and Non-Discrimination', pointed at violence against non-Serbs, stating that in the cities of Banja Luka and Trebinje, mobs attacked people who sought to lay foundations for new mosques.

Non-Serbs have reported continuing difficulties in returning to their original homes, and the assembly has a poor record of cooperation in apprehending individuals indicted for war crimes, crimes against humanity, and genocide.

Organisations such as the Society for Threatened Peoples, reporting to the United Nations Human Rights Council in 2008, have made claims of discrimination against non-Serb refugees in Republika Srpska, particularly areas with high unemployment in the Drina Valley such as Srebrenica, Bratunac, Višegrad, and Foča.

According to the Ministry for Human Rights and Refugees of Bosnia and Herzegovina, European Union Police Mission, UNHCR, and other international organisations, security in both Republika Srpska and the Federation of Bosnia and Herzegovina in 2015 was satisfactory.

== Governance ==
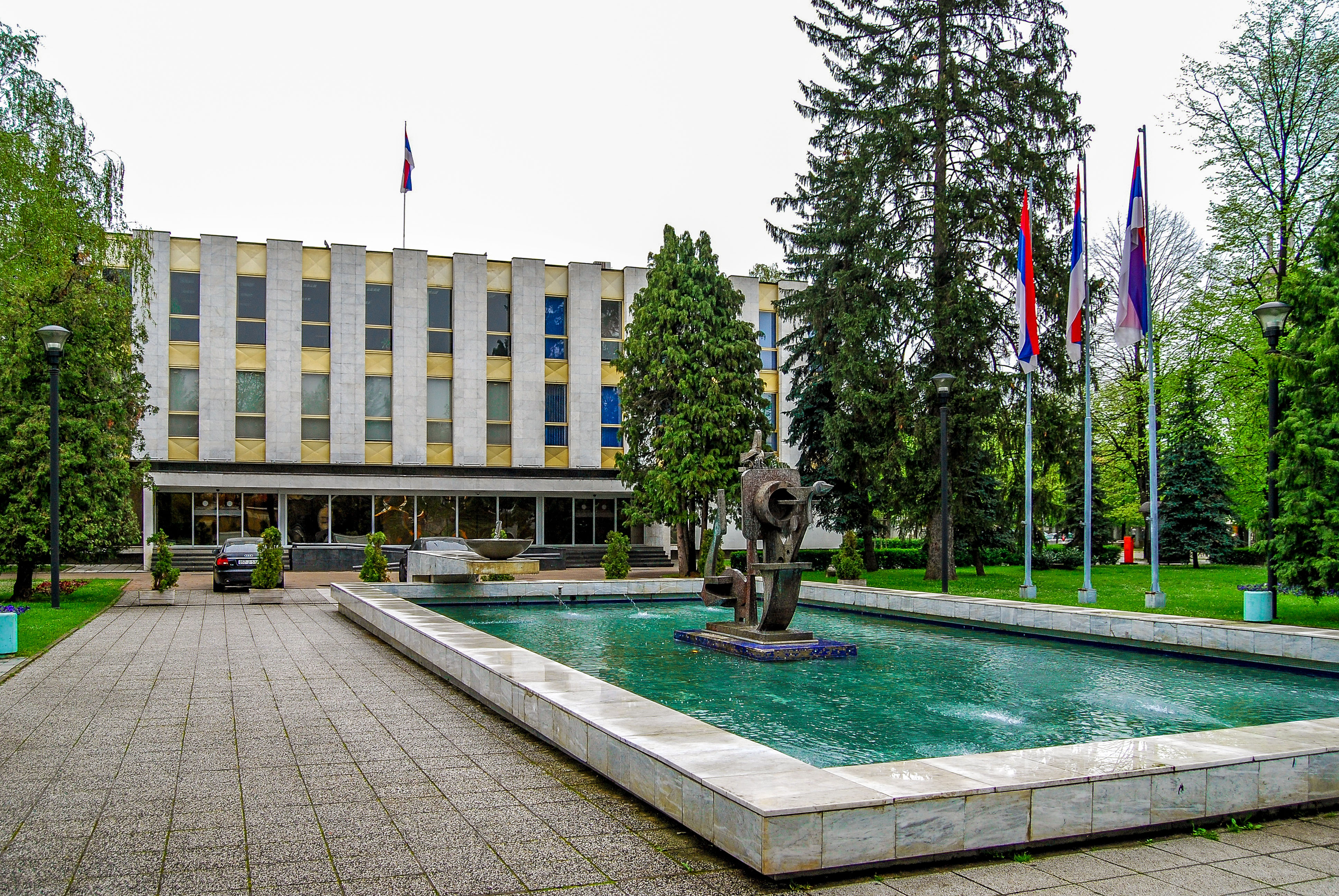
The National Assembly of Republika Srpska in Banja Luka

According to its constitution, Republika Srpska has its president, legislature (the 83-member unicameral National Assembly of Republika Srpska), executive government, police force, court system, customs service (under the state-level customs service), and postal service. It also has official symbols, including a coat of arms, a flag (a variant of the Serbian flag without the coat of arms displayed) and its entity anthem. The Constitutional Law on the Coat of Arms and Anthem of Republika Srpska was ruled not in concordance with the Constitution of Bosnia and Herzegovina as it states that those symbols 'represent the statehood of Republika Srpska' and are used 'under moral norms of the Serb people'. According to the Constitutional Court's decision, the Law was to be corrected by September 2006. Republika Srpska later changed its emblem.

Although the constitution names Sarajevo as the capital, the northwestern city of Banja Luka is the headquarters of most of the institutions of government, including the parliament, and is, therefore, the de facto capital. After the war, Republika Srpska retained its army, but in August 2005, the parliament consented to transfer control of Army of Republika Srpska to a state-level ministry and abolish the entity's defence ministry and army by 1 January 2006. These reforms were required by NATO as a precondition of Bosnia and Herzegovina's admission to the Partnership for Peace programme. Bosnia and Herzegovina joined the programme in December 2006.

In July 2023, legislation was passed criminalising insult and defamation, with penalties of up to 10 years in prison. This is likely to jeopardise freedom of speech and silence critics. Critics have said this could turn the Republika Srpska into an authoritarian regime.

Republika Srpska also acts as a unitary state with high levels of centralisation as well, contrasting the Federation of Bosnia and Herzegovina who uses federalism.

=== Law and judicial system ===
The highest court of appeal is the Supreme Court of Republika Srpska. The regional courts are an instance between the Supreme Court and the basic courts. Commercial courts handle cases in their respective domains. High Judicial and Prosecutorial Council of Republika Srpska is responsible for the appointment of judges and prosecutors.

In February 2025, the Court of Bosnia and Herzegovina sentenced Milorad Dodik to one year in prison and banned him from serving as President of Republika Srpska for six years, for non-compliance with the decisions of the High Representative for Bosnia and Herzegovina. Dodik rejected the ruling, claiming he was a target of political persecution. The sentence was confirmed on 6 August 2025. On 18 August, his appeal was rejected, terminating Dodik's mandate as President, with the termination date marked as 12 June 2025. The resignation of Prime Minister Radovan Višković followed on the same day.

== Geography ==
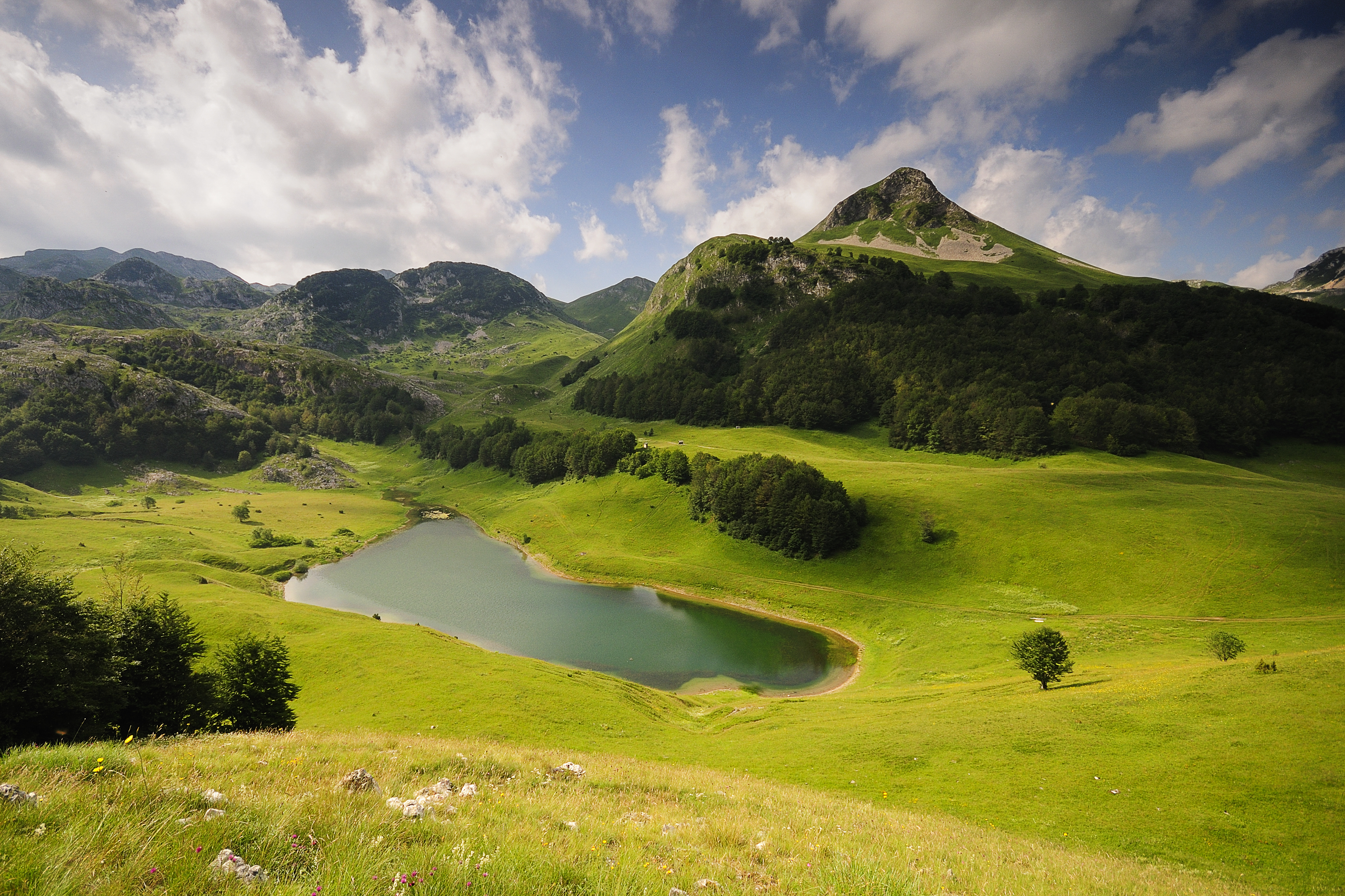
Orlovačko Lake located in Sutjeska National Park

Situated in Southeast Europe, Republika Srpska is located on the Balkan Peninsula, with its northern extents reaching into the Pannonian Basin. Republika Srpska lies between latitudes 42° and 46° N and longitudes 16° and 20° E. The entity is split into two main parts by the Brčko District; a hilly western part and a more varied eastern part, with high mountains in the south and flat, fertile farmland in the north. Republika Srpska, unlike its counterpart entity, is landlocked.

Like the rest of Bosnia and Herzegovina, Republika Srpska is split into a Bosnian region in the north and a Herzegovinian region in the far south. Within these two macroregions exist smaller geographical regions, from the forested hills of Bosanska Krajina in the northwest to the fertile plains of Semberija in the northeast.

Republika Srpska covers 24,816.2 square kilometres (9,582 square miles), excluding the Brčko District, which is held in condominium by both entities, but is de facto sovereign within Bosnia and Herzegovina. Republika Srpska, if it were a country, would be the 146th largest in the world. Elevation varies greatly, with Maglić, a peak in the Dinaric Alps near Montenegro, reaching 2,386 metres (7,828 ft), and parts nearer the Adriatic going down to sea level. The largest and most popular ski resort in Bosnia and Herzegovina is situated on the slopes of the mountain Jahorina, in the eastern part of the entity. Other major mountains in Republika Srpska include Volujak, Zelengora, Lelija, Lebršnik, Crvanj, Orjen, Klekovača, Vitorog, Kozara, Romanija, Treskavica and Trebević.

=== Boundary ===
Republika Srpska shares international borders with Croatia to the north, Serbia to the east, and Montenegro to the southeast. Within Bosnia and Herzegovina, the Inter-Entity Boundary Line (IEBL) marks Republika Srpska's administrative division with the Federation of Bosnia and Herzegovina, and essentially follows the front lines at the end of the Bosnian War with some adjustments (most importantly in the western part of the country and around Sarajevo) as defined by the Dayton Agreement. The total length of the IEBL is approximately 1,080 km. The IEBL is an administrative demarcation uncontrolled by military or police, and there is free movement across it.

=== Forests ===
Republika Srpska is one of the most forested areas in Europe, with over 50% of its land covered by forests. Perućica is one of the last old-growth forests in Europe.

Two densely wooded national parks—Sutjeska National Park and Kozara National Park—are located in the entity.

=== Waters ===
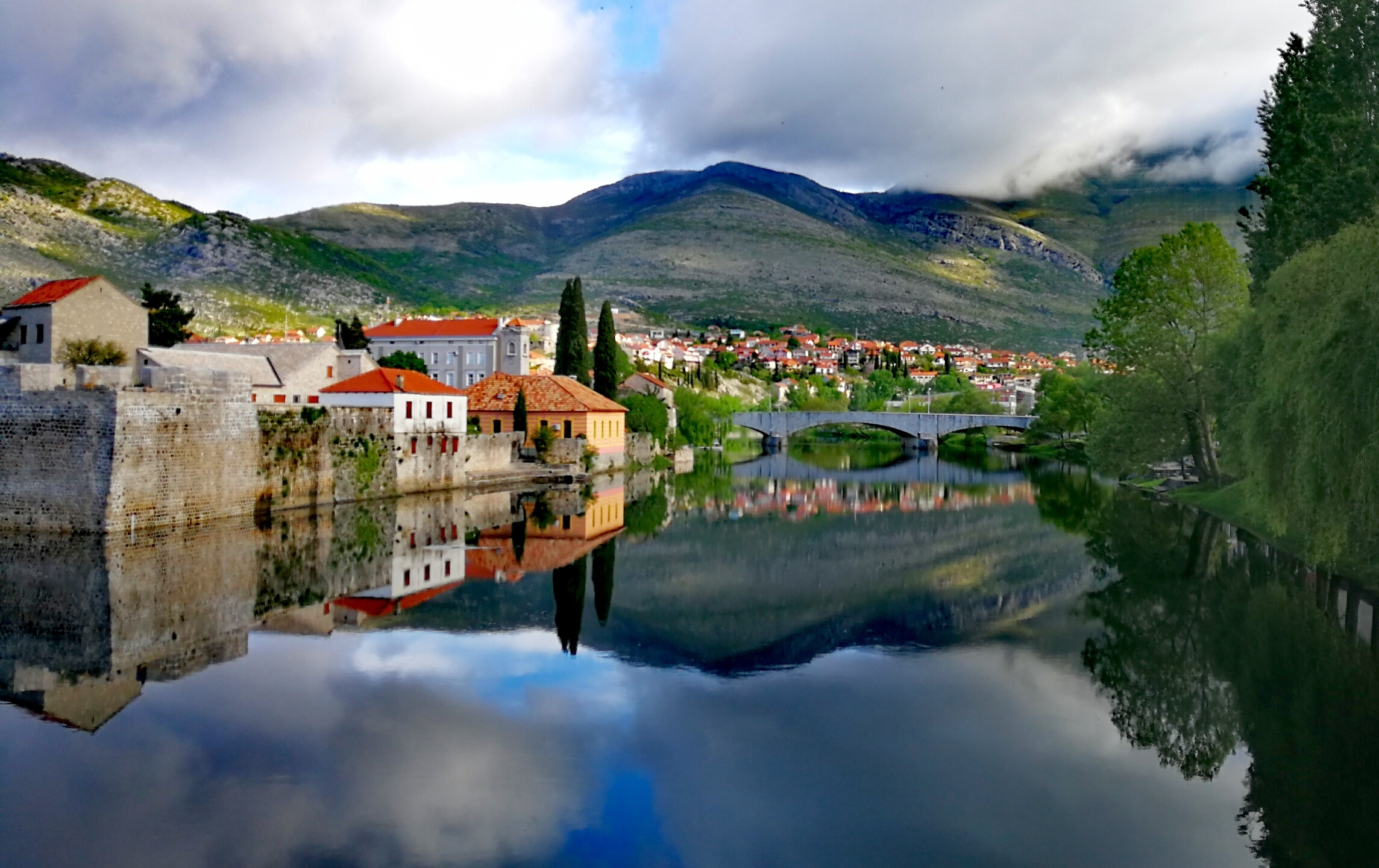
Trebinje on the banks of the Trebišnjica

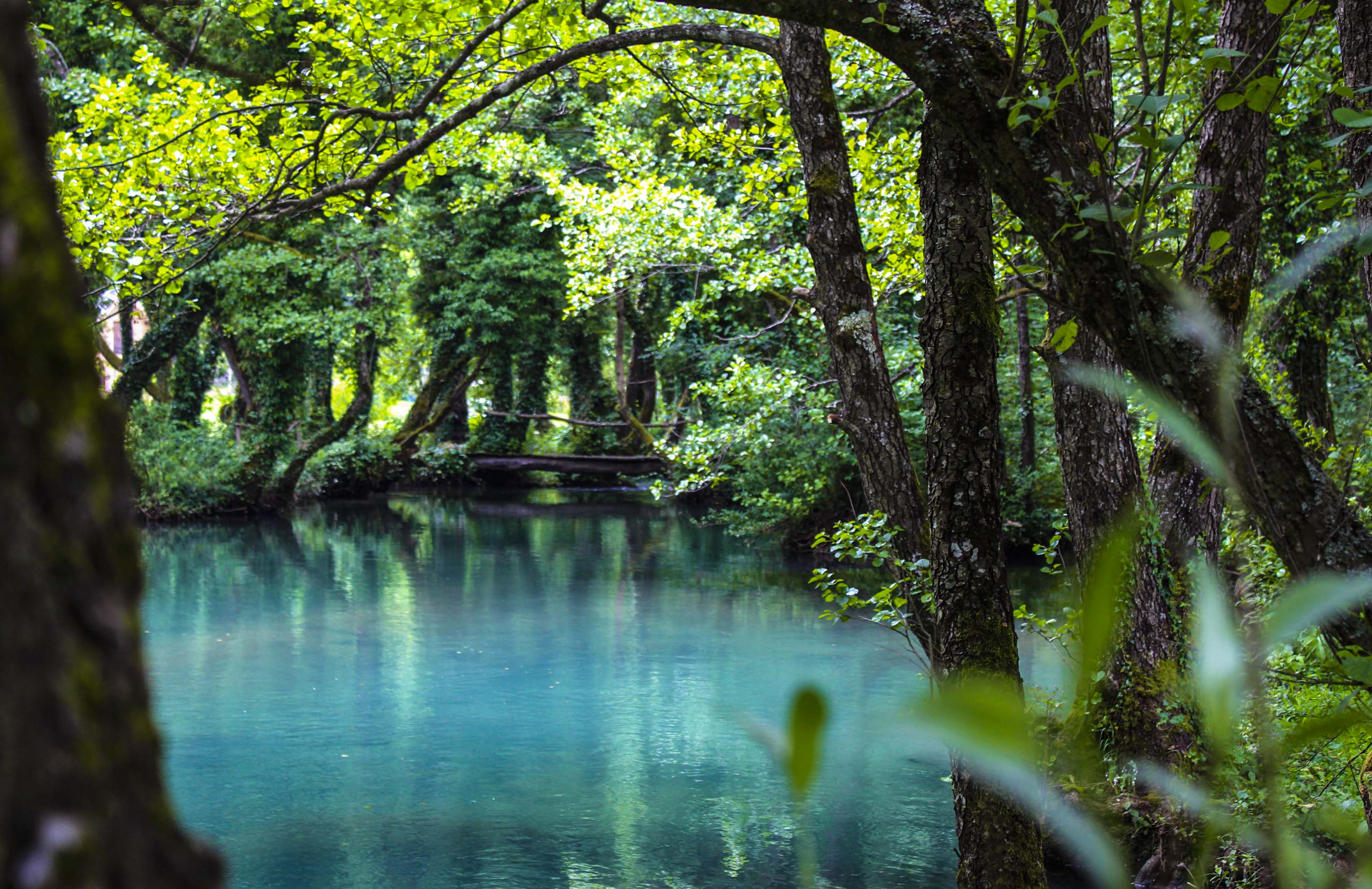
The protected area of Prašuma Janje

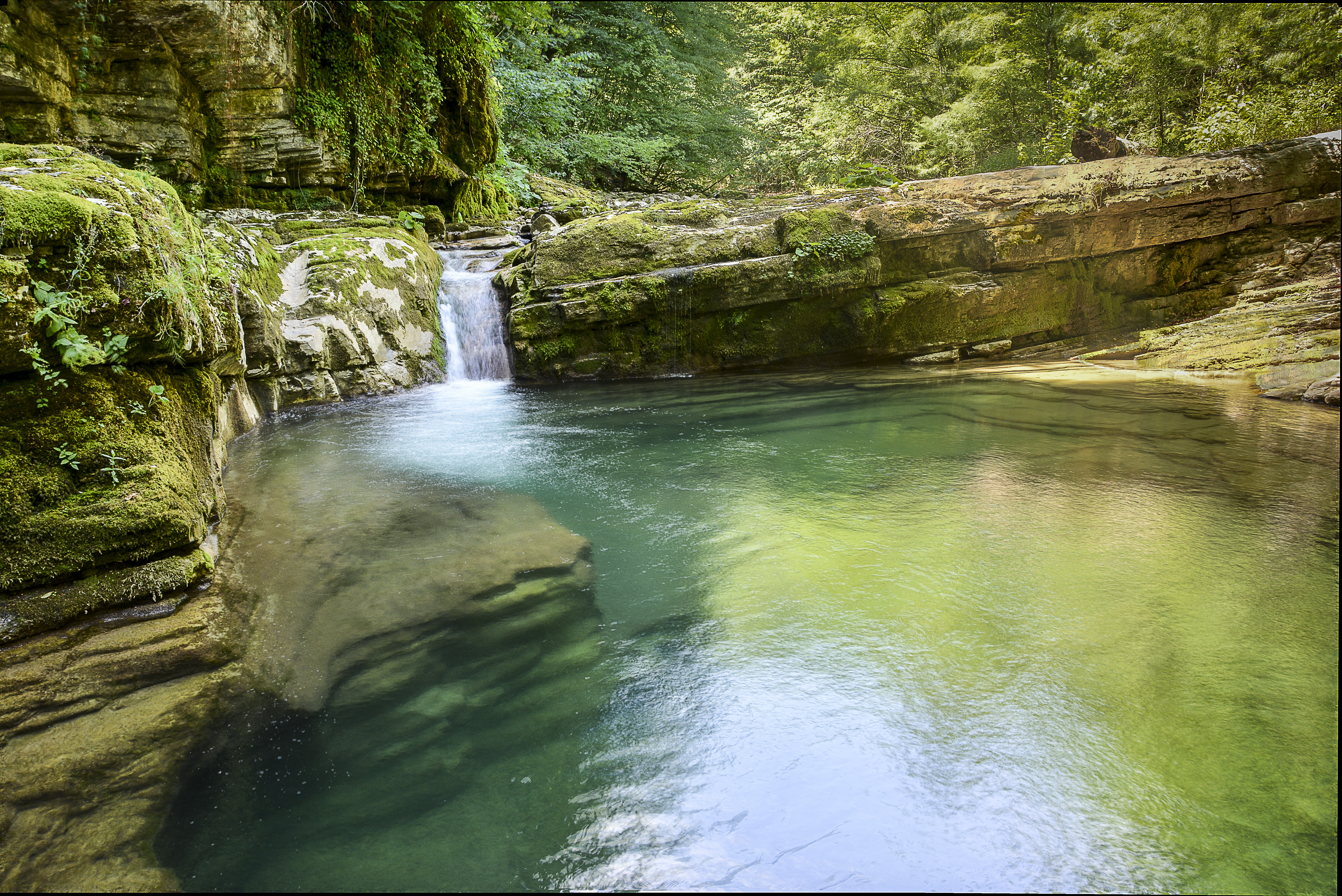
Cvrcka Canyon

Most rivers belong to the Black Sea drainage basin. The principal rivers are the Sava, a tributary of the Danube that forms the northern boundary with Croatia; the Bosna, Vrbas, Sana and Una, which all flow north and empty into the Sava; the Drina, which flows north and forms a significant part of the eastern boundary with Serbia, and is also a tributary of the Sava. The Trebišnjica is one of the longest sinking rivers in the world. It belongs to the Adriatic Sea drainage basin. Skakavac Waterfall on the Perućica is one of the highest waterfalls in the country, at about 75 metres (246 feet) in height. The most important lakes are Bileća Lake, Lake Bardača (which includes a protected wetland area) and Balkana Lake.

=== National Parks ===
Name	Image	Area (km^{2})	Established
Sutjeska National Park		173	1965
Drina National Park		63	2017
Kozara National Park		34	1967

== Demographics ==
As of the 2013 census, Republika Srpska has a total population of 1,228,423 and a population density of 49.9 inhabitants per square kilometre. Republika Srpska comprises 48% of the land area of Bosnia and Herzegovina, and is home to 34.79% of the country's total population. The overall life expectancy in Republika Srpska at birth was 77.15 years in 2019.

The Republika Srpska Bureau of Statistics estimated a population of 1,114,819 in 2023.

The total fertility rate in Republika Srpska is, as of 2023, 1.45 children per mother. In 2023, the total number of live births, according to the Institute of Statistics of Republika Srpska (RZS), was 16,174. That same year, the number of deaths was 20,361, resulting in a natural population decrease of 4,187 inhabitants.

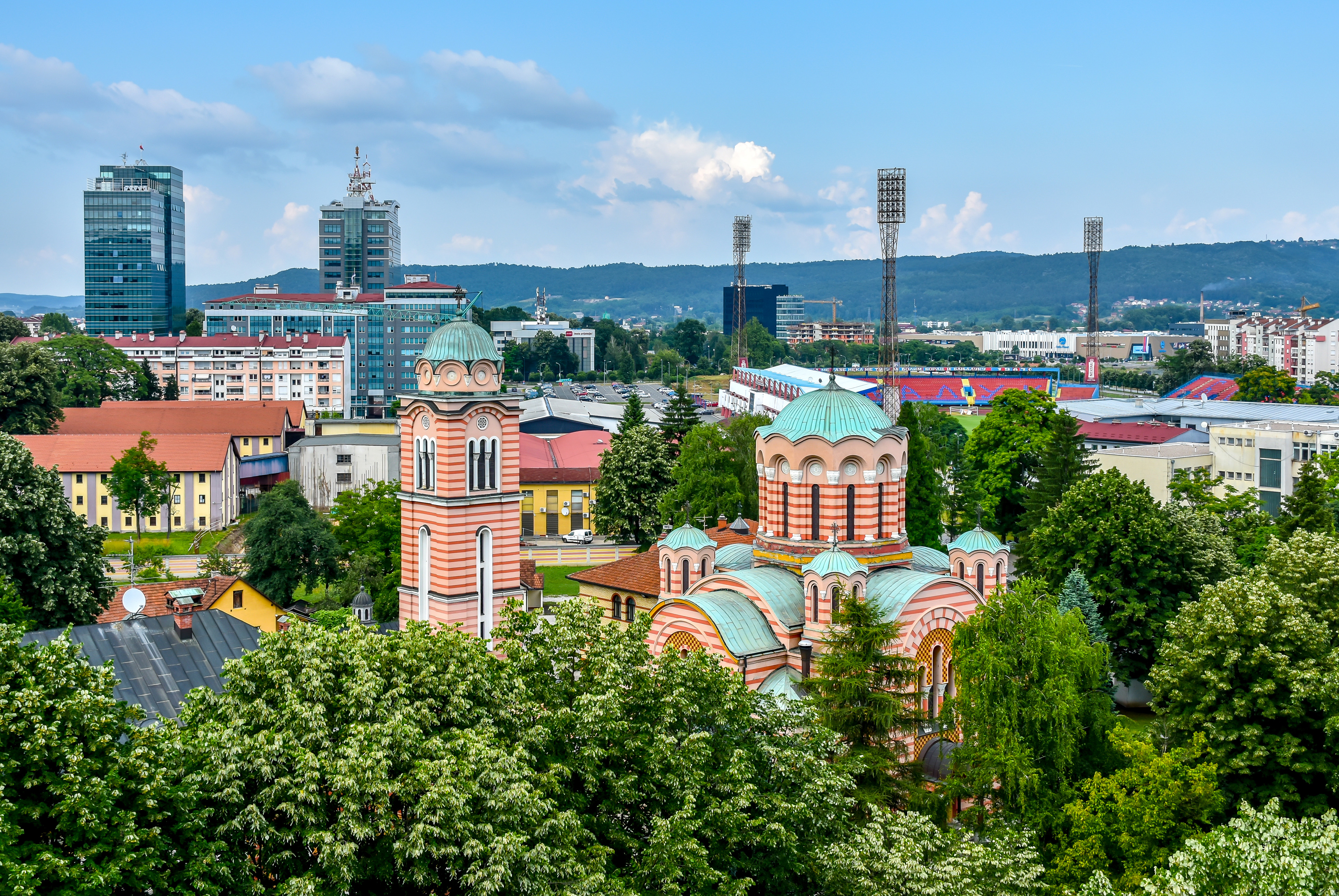
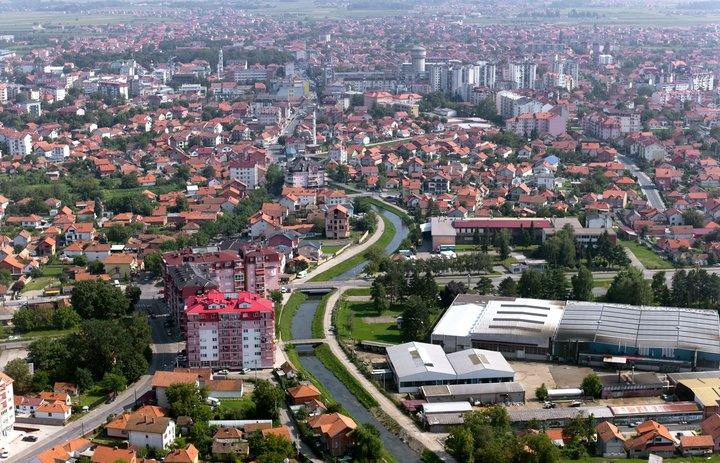
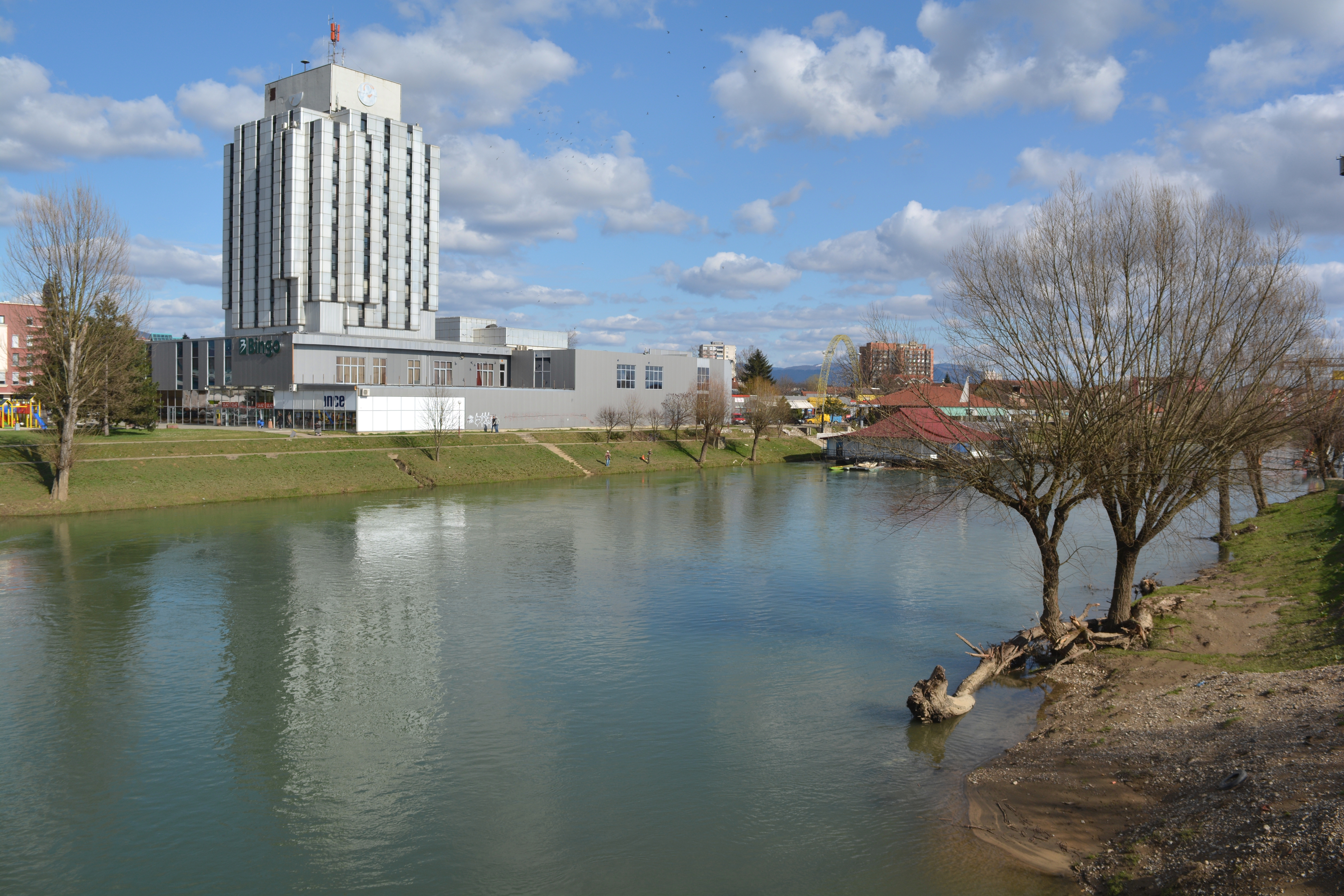
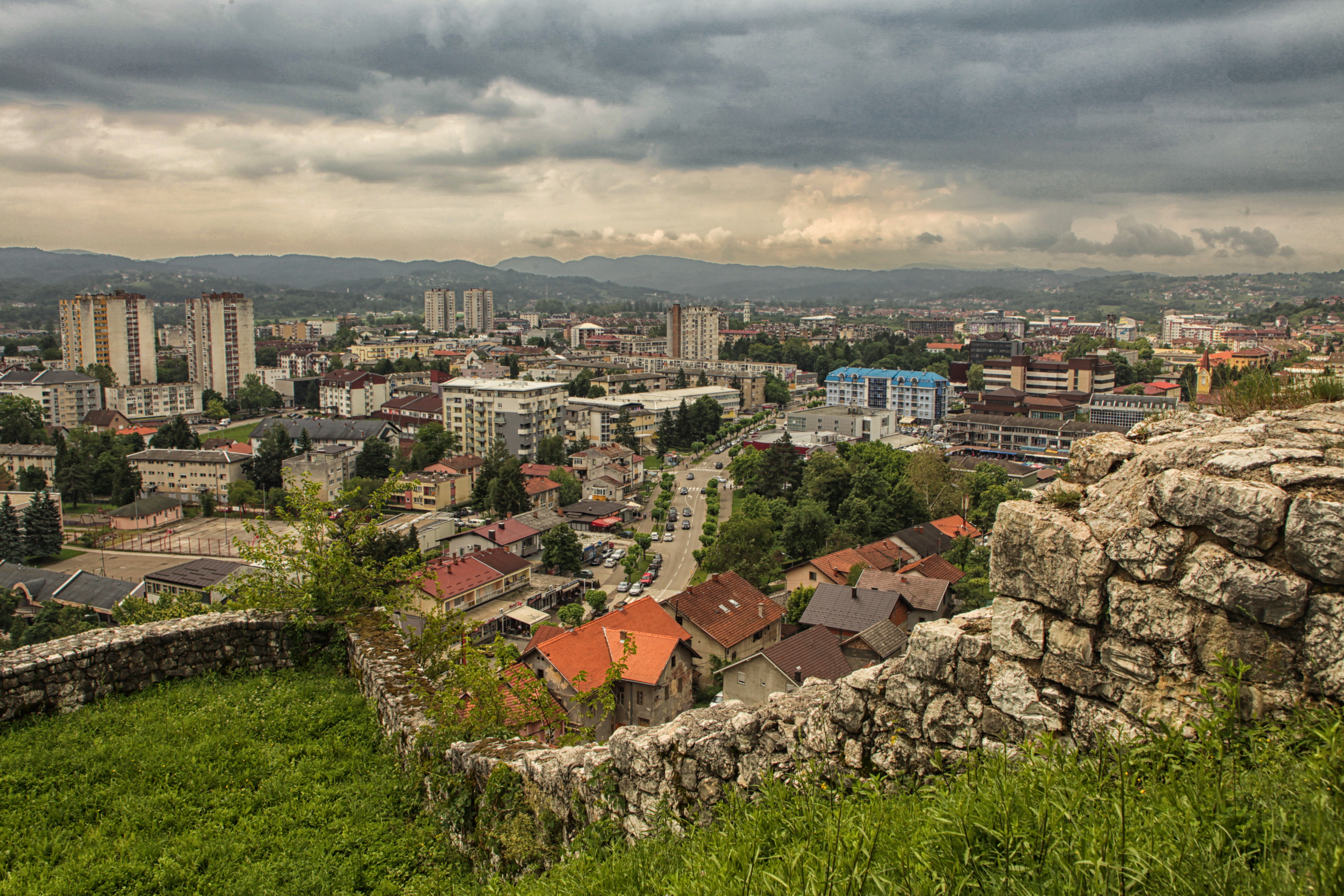
Most populous municipalities of Republika Srpska
Banja Luka Bijeljina	Rank	Municipality	Population	City-governed territory	Prijedor Doboj
Banja Luka Bijeljina	1	Banja Luka	180,053	1,239 km^{2} (478 sq mi)	Prijedor Doboj
Banja Luka Bijeljina	2	Bijeljina	103,874	734 km^{2} (283 sq mi)	Prijedor Doboj
Banja Luka Bijeljina	3	Prijedor	80,916	834 km^{2} (322 sq mi)	Prijedor Doboj
Banja Luka Bijeljina	4	Doboj	68,514	772 km^{2} (298 sq mi)	Prijedor Doboj
Banja Luka Bijeljina	5	Istočno Sarajevo	59,916	1,450 km^{2} (560 sq mi)	Prijedor Doboj
Banja Luka Bijeljina	6	Zvornik	54,407	376 km^{2} (145 sq mi)	Prijedor Doboj
Banja Luka Bijeljina	7	Gradiška	49,196	762 km^{2} (294 sq mi)	Prijedor Doboj
Banja Luka Bijeljina	8	Teslić	37,236	838 km^{2} (324 sq mi)	Prijedor Doboj
Banja Luka Bijeljina	9	Prnjavor	34,357	762 km^{2} (294 sq mi)	Prijedor Doboj
Banja Luka Bijeljina	10	Laktaši	34,210	388 km^{2} (150 sq mi)	Prijedor Doboj
Banja Luka Bijeljina	Source: 2013 Census				Prijedor Doboj

=== Education ===
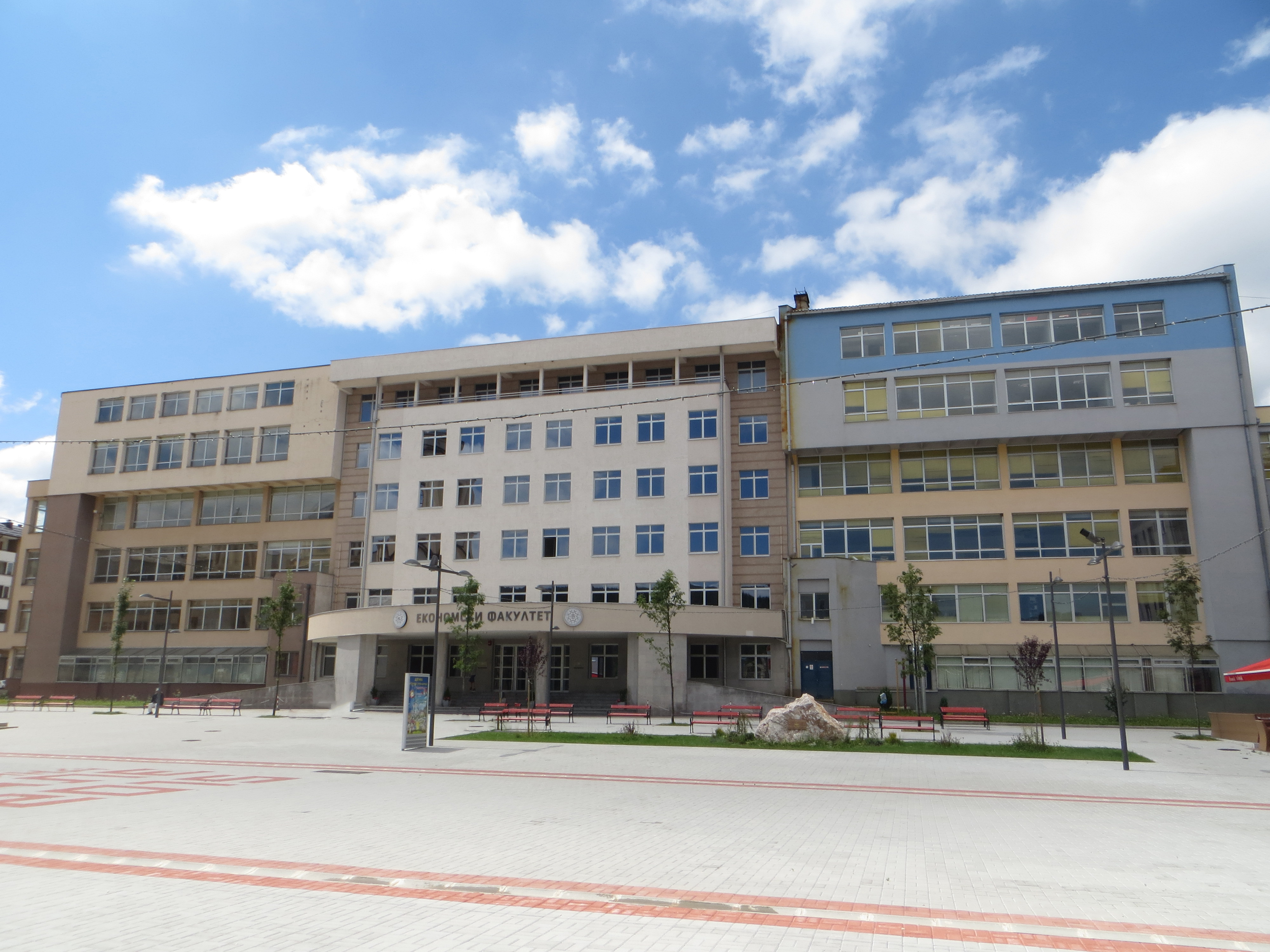
University of East Sarajevo, in Pale

Literacy in Republika Srpska stands at 96.8 percent as of 2013. Free primary education is provided as a right to all people in Republika Srpska and Bosnia and Herzegovina. There are 187 primary schools in addition to 11 music schools and 4 centres of education for students with learning disabilities. Secondary education exists in three main channels: three-year vocational schools, four-year technical schools, and four-year grammar schools (gimnazije). Ten independent grammar schools exist, while an additional 30 are integrated into other schools. Music schools offer another option for students to continue their education following primary school.

The oldest and largest public university in Republika Srpska is the University of Banja Luka, which was established in 1975. The second of two public universities in Republika Srpska is University of East Sarajevo. After the end of the Yugoslav wars several private institutions of higher education were established, including American University in Bosnia and Herzegovina, Slobomir University, and University Sinergija. The Academy of Sciences and Arts of Republika Srpska, founded in 1996, is the highest representative institution of science and art in Republika Srpska.

The National and University Library of Republika Srpska is a national library, located in Banja Luka. The Museum of Contemporary Art (MSURS) houses a collection of Yugoslav and international art and is located in Banja Luka.

=== Ethnic groups ===
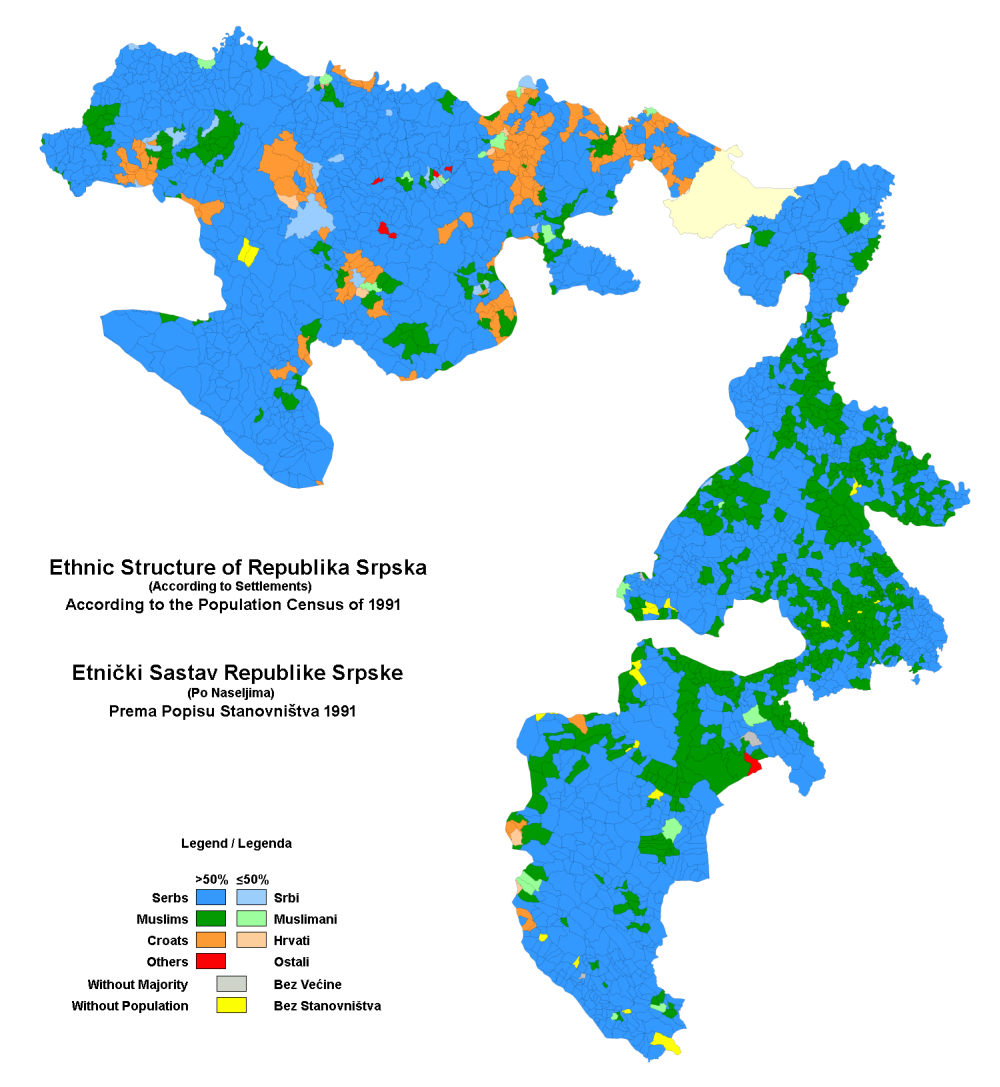
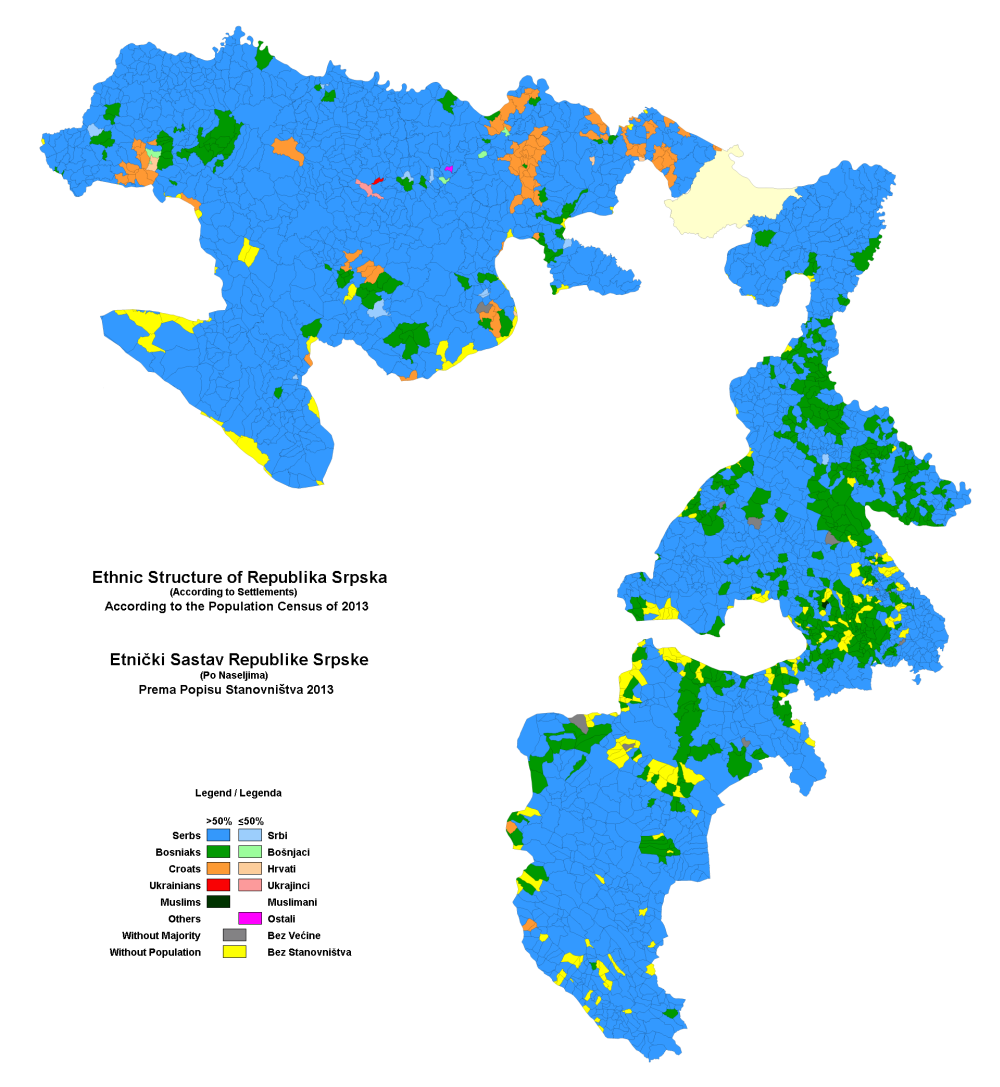
Ethnic structure of Republika Srpska: 1991 (left) and 2013 (right)

Population of Republika Srpska according to ethnic group 1991–2013
Ethnic group	Census 1991		Census 2013	
Ethnic group	Number	%	Number	%
Serbs	869,854	55.4%	970,857	83.0%
Bosniaks	440,746	28.1%	148,477	12.7%
Croats	144,238	9.2%	26,509	2.3%
Others	114,494	7.3%	24,502	2.1%
Total	1,569,332		1,170,345	

=== Healthcare ===
The health care system of Republika Srpska is intended to provide organized and planned health care to the population on its territory, both in public and private health care institutions. Health care activities are performed by health care workers and associates under the conditions and in the manner primarily prescribed by law and regulations, adopted on the basis, and under, the Law on Health Care of the Republic of Srpska.

The public sector of Srpska includes 54 health centers, along with family medicine clinics.

Stationary treatment is provided in hospitals located in Derventa and Prnjavor. Hospitals specialised for physical medicine and rehabilitation are "Mlječanica" in Kozarska Dubica and Institute "Dr Miroslav Zotović" in Banja Luka. Patients with mental illnesses are treated in the Institute for Forensic Psychiatry in Sokolac, which is the first and only institution of this type in BiH, and the Hospital for Chronic Psychiatric Patients in Modriča.

University hospitals operate in Foča, and Banja Luka. The University Clinical Center of Republika Srpska (UCC RS) is the leading tertiary healthcare institution in the entity, comprising 21 clinics, 6 institutes, and 10 service units.

=== Religion ===
Republika Srpska has no official religion. Freedom of religion is a right defined by the Constitution of Republika Srpska, which provides for legal equality of all people, irrespective of religious belief.

According to the 2013 census, around 85% of the residents of Republika Srpska identify as Christian. Members of the Serbian Orthodox Church form the largest religious group, accounting for a little less than 83% of the population, followed by followers of Islam and Roman Catholicism. 0.59% of people describe themselves as atheist or agnostic.

Religion in Republika Srpska
religion	percent
Eastern Orthodoxy	82.8%
Islam	12.8%
Catholicism	2.2%
Atheism or Agnosticism	0.6%
Other	1.6%

Religion plays an important role in ethnic identification in Republika Srpska. Serbs generally identify as adherents of Eastern Orthodoxy, Croats as Roman Catholics, and Bosniaks as Muslims. Religious architecture takes on a similarly diverse character in the entity, with its mix of mosques and churches.

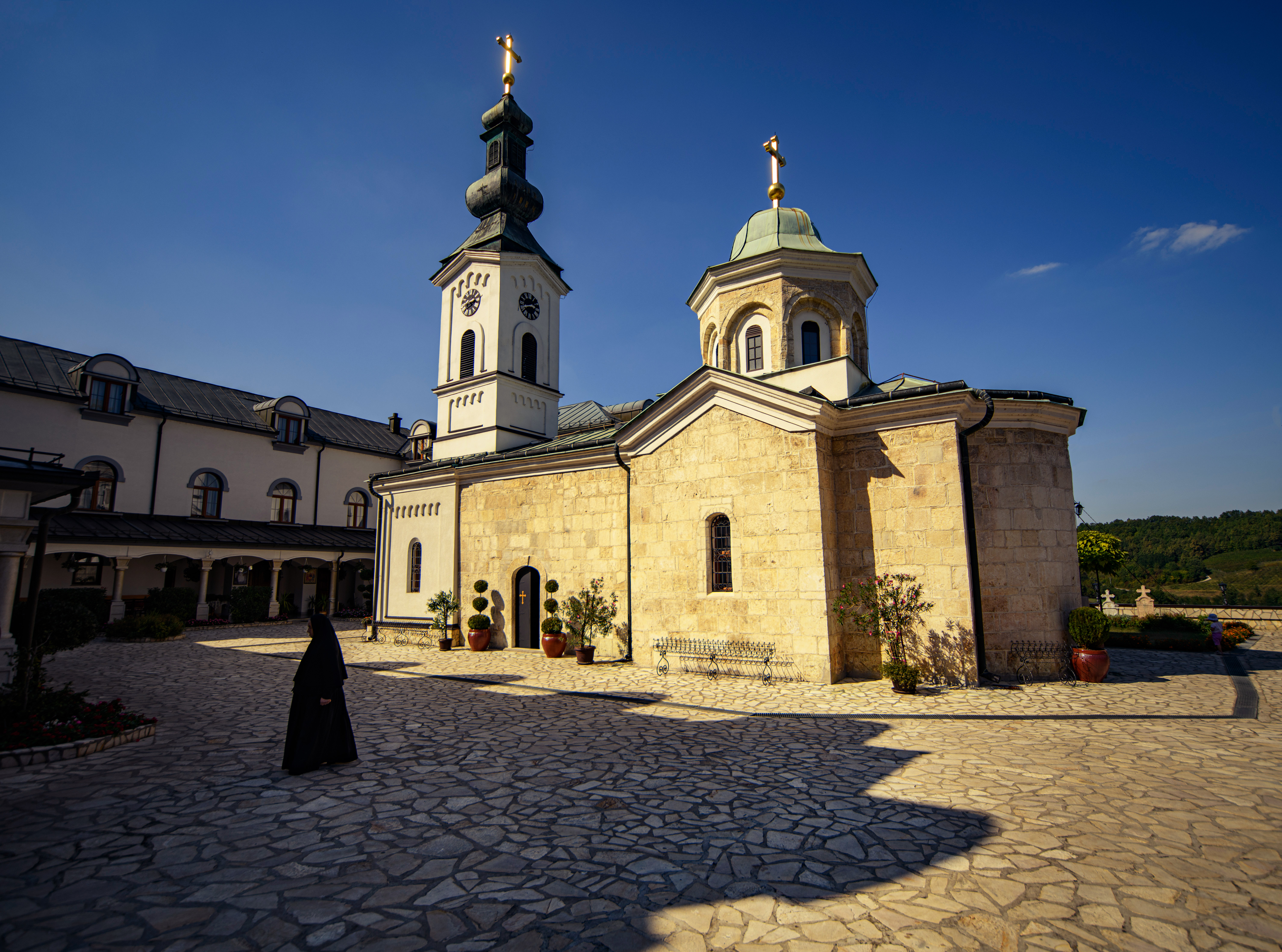
Tavna Monastery, near Bijeljina

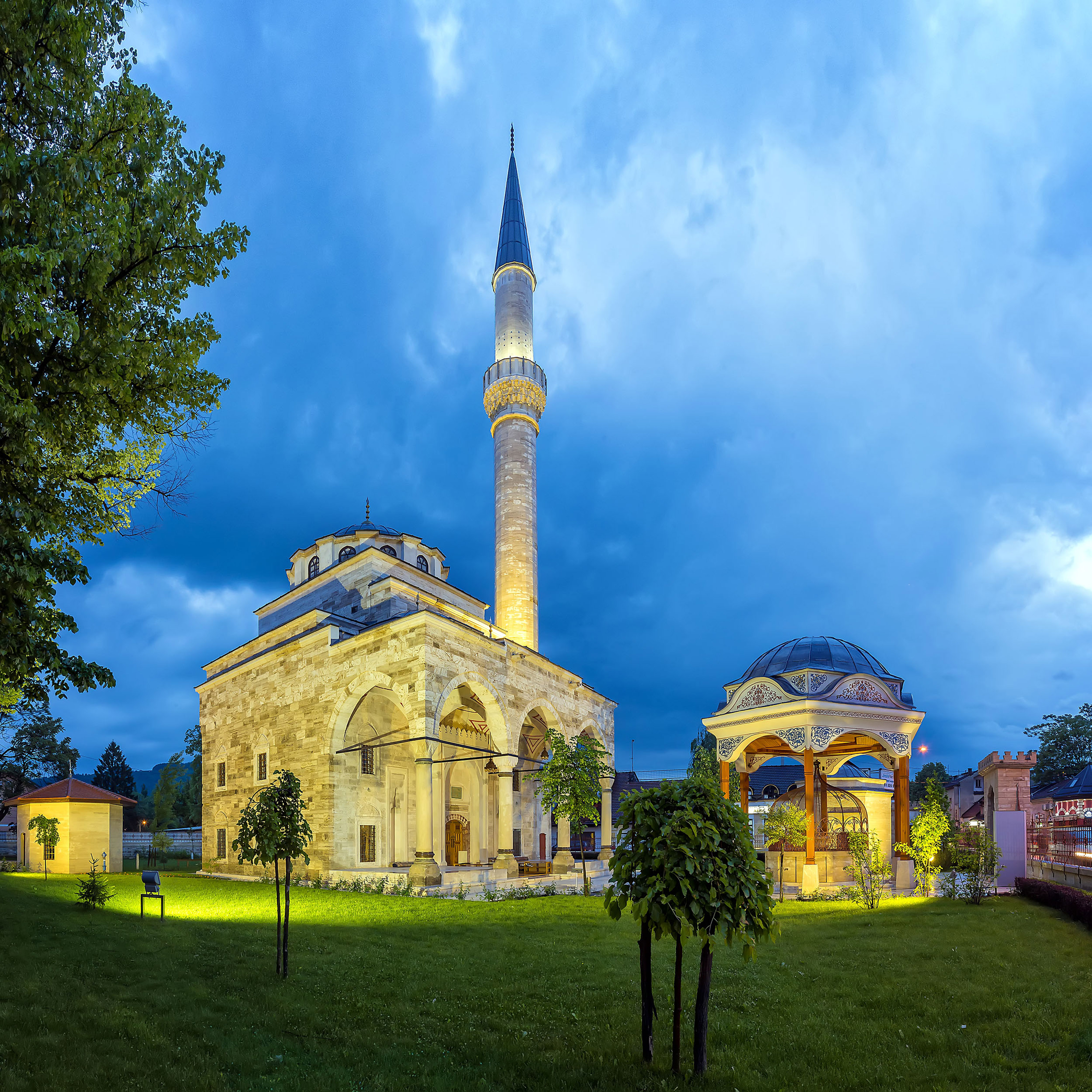
Ferhat Pasha Mosque, after it was reconstructed in 2016

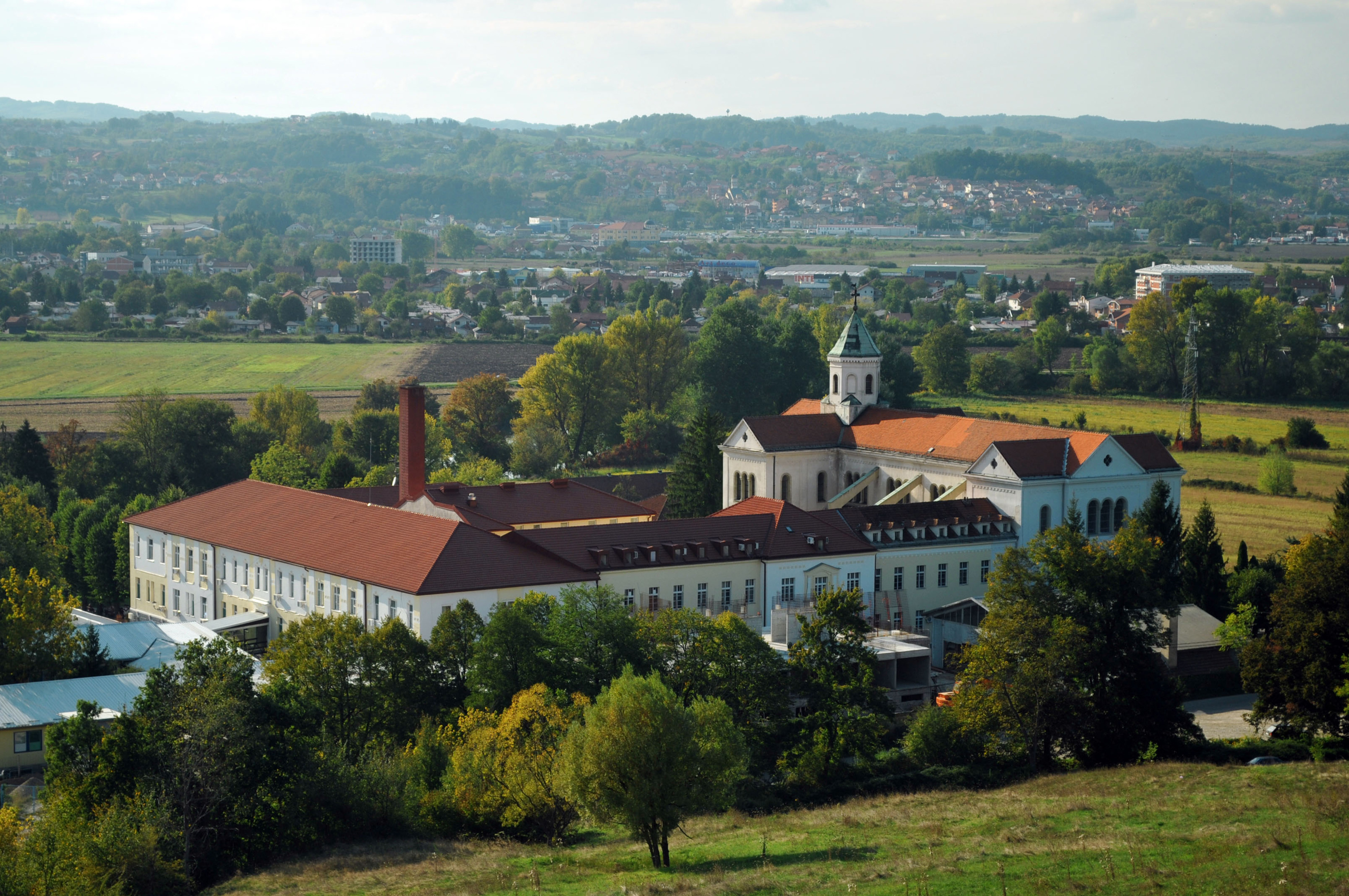
The Mariastern abbey, a Trappist abbey famous for its own variety of cheese

== Economy ==
Republika Srpska uses the Bosnia and Herzegovina convertible mark (KM). The currency is pegged to the euro at a unit rate of 1.95583 convertible marks. Along with the rest of Bosnia and Herzegovina, Republika Srpska is classified as an upper-middle income economy by the United Nations.

Republika Srpska's corporate tax rate is lower than that of the Federation of Bosnia and Herzegovina and is among the lowest in the region.

In November 2020, the governments of Serbia and Republika Srpska announced the construction of three hydropower plants on the Drina, estimated at EUR 520 million.

Economic indicators of Republika Srpska
Year	Gross domestic product, Bil. KM	Gross domestic product per capita, KM	Gross domestic product, Bil. USD	Gross domestic product per capita, USD	Participation in total BiH economy
2013	8.814	7,526	5.982	5,108	33.32%
2014	8.910	7,635	6.045	5,180	32.46%
2015	9.224	7,937	5.233	4,503	32.41%
2016	9.651	8,338	5.459	4,716	32.84%
2017	10.099	8,759	5.819	5,047	32.11%
2018	10.701	9,322	6.456	5,624	31.97%
2019	11.251	9,848	6.439	5,636	31.89%
2020	11.132	9,797	6.485	5,707	32.49%
2021	12.502	11,080	7.559	6,699	32.36%
2022	14.537	12,977	7.815	6,976	33.04%
2023	16.086	14,429	8.892	7,976	32.31%

=== External trade ===
External trade of Republika Srpska (mil. euros) (not including trade with the Federation of Bosnia and Herzegovina and the Brčko District)
Year	2001	2002	2003	2004	2005	2006	2007	2008	2009	2010	2011	2012	2013	2014	2015	2016	2017	2018	2019	2020	2021	2022	2023
Exports	306	289	312	431	578	788	855	983	855	1,114	1,309	1,214	1,331	1,376	1,337	1,467	1,777	1,913	1,846	1,735	2,265	2,779	2,651
Imports	868	1,107	1,165	1,382	1,510	1,411	1,712	2,120	1,824	2,072	2,340	2,294	2,330	2,529	2,334	2,263	2,505	2,670	2,445	2,287	2,853	3,670	3,600
Total trade	1,174	1,396	1,477	1,813	2,088	2,199	2,566	3,103	2,680	3,186	3,650	3,509	3,662	3,905	3,570	3,730	4,282	4,583	4,291	4,022	5,118	6,449	6,251
Coverage (%)	35	26	27	31	38	56	50	46	47	54	56	53	57	54	60	65	71	72	75	76	79	76	74

=== Taxation and salaries ===
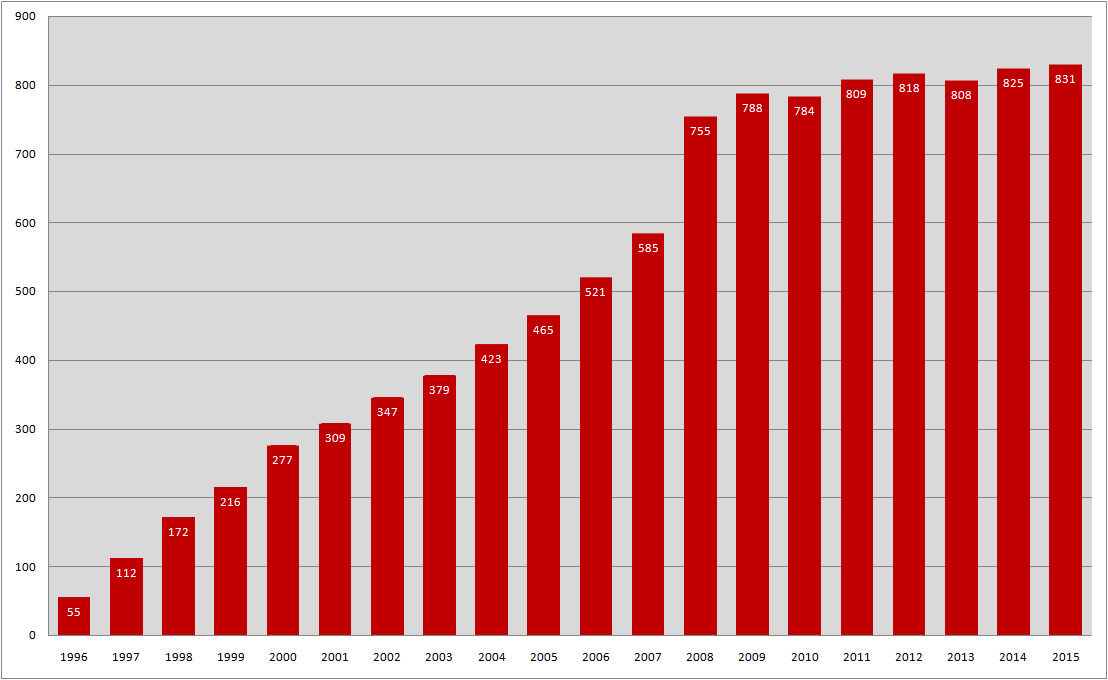
Average net wages (in KM) in Republika Srpska 1996–2015

Since 2001, Republika Srpska has initiated significant reforms in the sector of the tax system, which lowered the tax burden to 28.6%, one of the lowest in the region. The 10% rate of capital gains tax and income tax are among the lowest in Europe. VAT has been introduced in 2006. These tax advantages have led to some companies moving their business to Republika Srpska from the other entity.

As of 2018, there are 266,309 employed people within legal entities in Republika Srpska. The average net wage, according to the Institute of Statistics of Republika Srpska (RZS), is 896 km (€458) per month as of February 2019, a nominal growth of 1.0% compared to the previous month. Unemployment contributed to emigration.

=== Transport ===
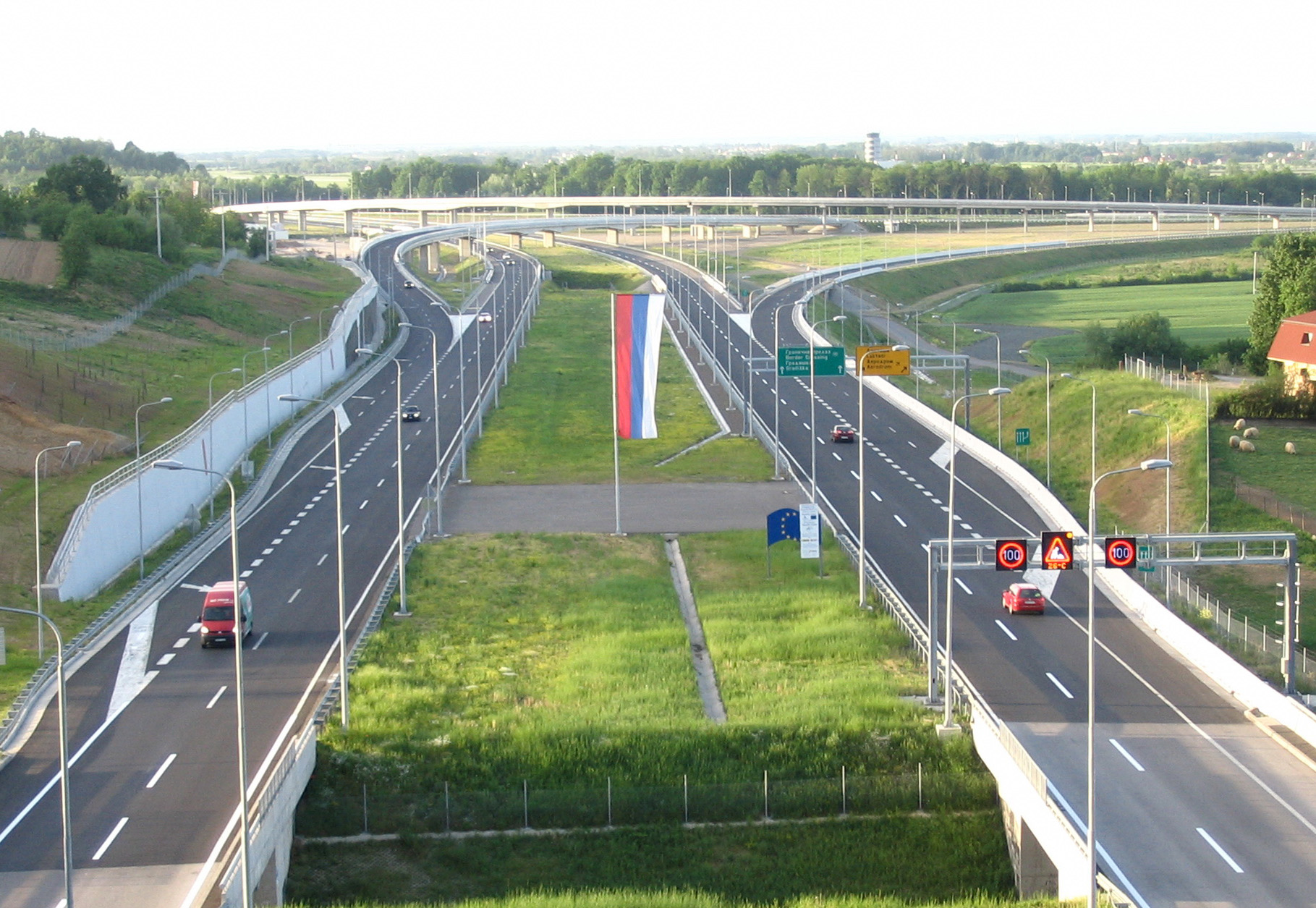
Interchange on the Gradiška-Banja Luka highway

Transport and telecommunications infrastructure in Republika Srpska is regulated by the Ministry of Transport and Communications. Traffic infrastructure includes roads, railways, railway stations, airports, waterways, and ports in the whole territory of Republika Srpska, while telecommunication infrastructure includes telephony, telegraphy, optical cables, terrestrial communication stations, traffic telematics and others.

State-owned companies like Republika Srpska Railways, Pošte Srpske, and Republika Srpska Roads are in charge of maintaining traffic on the territory.

The basic road traffic network in Srpska includes 4,192 kilometers of public roads, of which 1,781 km of trunk roads and 2,183 km of regional roads. There are currently two highways in Republika Srpska: Gradiška – Banja Luka highway and the "9th January highway" (Banja Luka – Doboj). Arterial highways in Srpska, which are a part of the International E-road network are:

- European road E761 (M5): (Federation of BiH) — Istočno Sarajevo — Podromanija — Rogatica — Ustiprača — Višegrad — Vardište/Kotroman (Serbia)
- European route E761 (M5): (Federation BiH) — Velečevo — Čađavica — Rogolji — Mrkonjić Grad — Jezero — (Federation of BiH)
- European route E73 (M17): (Croatia) Slavonski Šamac — Modriča — Rudanka — Doboj — Karuše — (Federation of BiH)
- European route E661 (M16): (Croatia) Stara Gradiška — Laktaši — Banja Luka — Karanovac — Ugar — (Federation of BiH)
- European route E762 (M18): (Federation of BiH) — Istočno Sarajevo — Trnovo — Foča — Hum/Šćepan Polje (Montenegro)

The total length of the regular gauge railway in Srpska is 425 km. Republika Srpska Railways transports around 1 million passengers and 5 million tons of goods each year. The international code of the Republika Srpska Railways is 0044.

=== Tourism ===
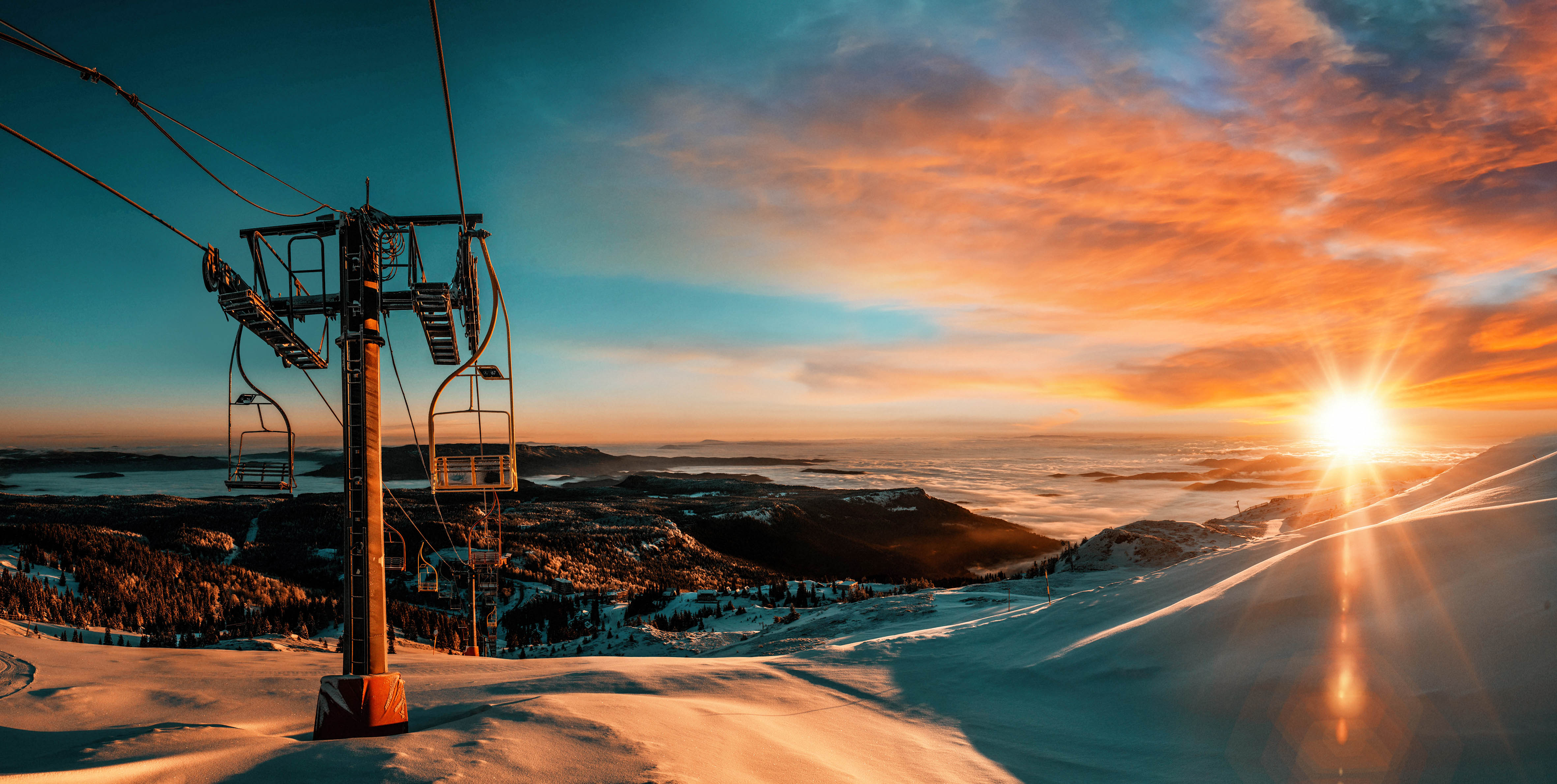
Jahorina ski resort is the biggest in Bosnia and one of the biggest in the Balkans

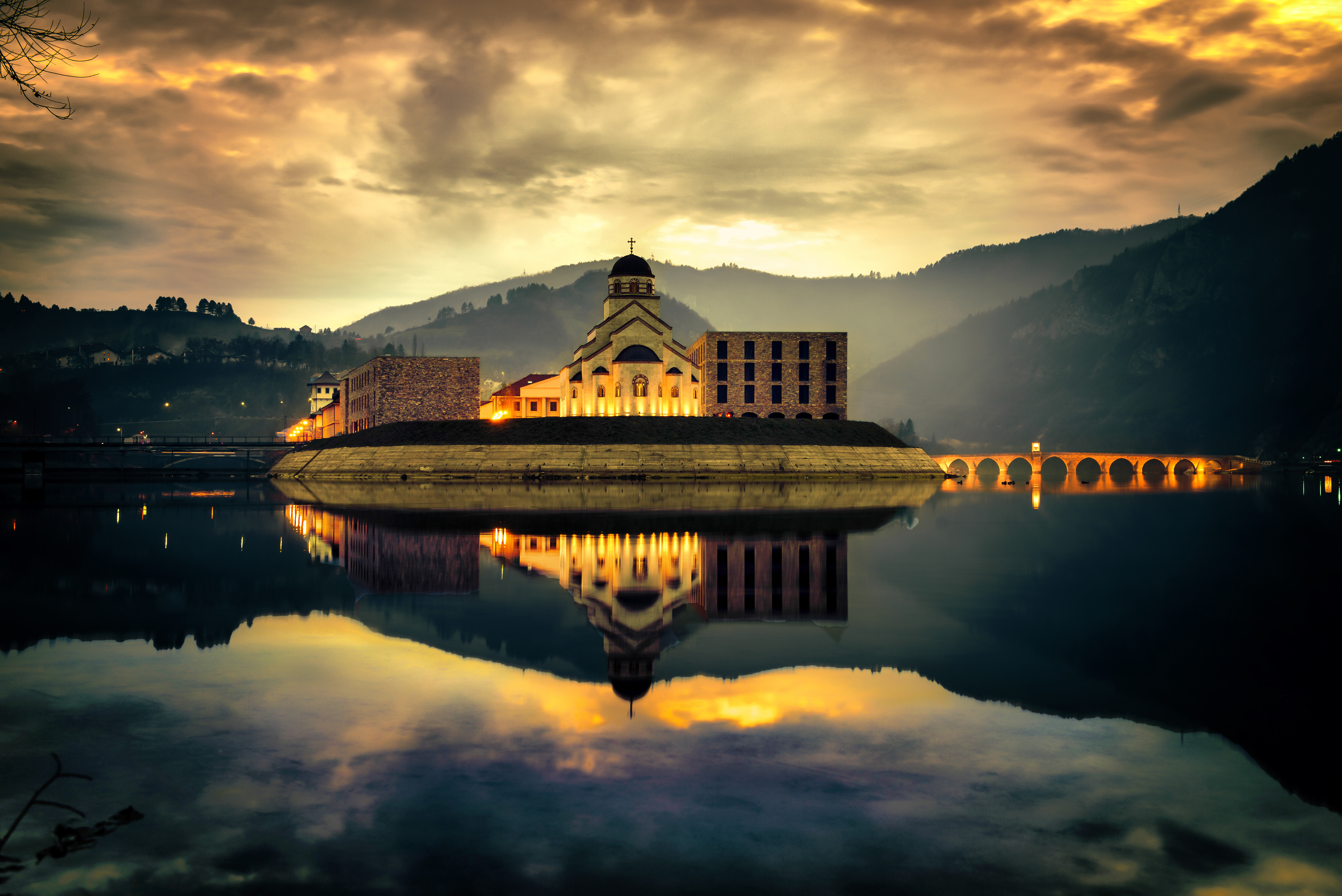
Andrićgrad

Some types of tourism in the Republic of Srpska are: mountain, spa, religious, ethno-tourism and ecotourism.

Republika Srpska has rich but fragmented natural resources. Popular mountains include: Zelengora, Treskavica, Jahorina, Romanija, as well as Grmeč, Kozara, Ozren and many others, with rich flora and hunting grounds.

Jahorina ski resort is a mountain resort and the largest and most popular winter tourism resort in the country. The ski resort is situated on the slopes of Jahorina mountain in Dinaric Alps. It is located 15 km (9.3 mi) from the municipality of Pale and 30 km (19 mi) from the Sarajevo International Airport. The Jahorina ski resort hosted alpine skiing competitions during the 1984 Winter Olympics.

Royal village Kontromanićevo near Doboj and Stanišići are popular destinations for ethno-tourism. Andrićgrad is a tourist complex inspired by the works of Nobel Prize winner Ivo Andrić, located on Drina near Višegrad. It is made of stone with around fifty object, including a local theatre, cinema, art gallery, church, Andrić's institute, hotels and various shops.

Several rivers with clear water and potential for fishing are located in Srpska, such as Una, Sana, Tara, Drina and Ukrina.

The best known spas in Srpska are Banja Vrućica, Dvorovi, Guber, Laktaši, Lješljani, Mlječanica and Višegrad spa.

An important annual event of Serbs from the region of Bosanska Krajina is the Corrida of Grmeč. So far 248 bullfighting events have been held at Grmeč.

=== External relations ===
In September 2006, Republika Srpska officials signed a 'special ties agreement' with Serbia aimed at promoting economic and institutional cooperation between Serbia and Republika Srpska. The accord was signed by Serbia's President Boris Tadić and Prime Minister Vojislav Koštunica, former Republika Srpska President Dragan Čavić, and Republika Srpska Prime Minister Milorad Dodik.

=== Representative offices ===
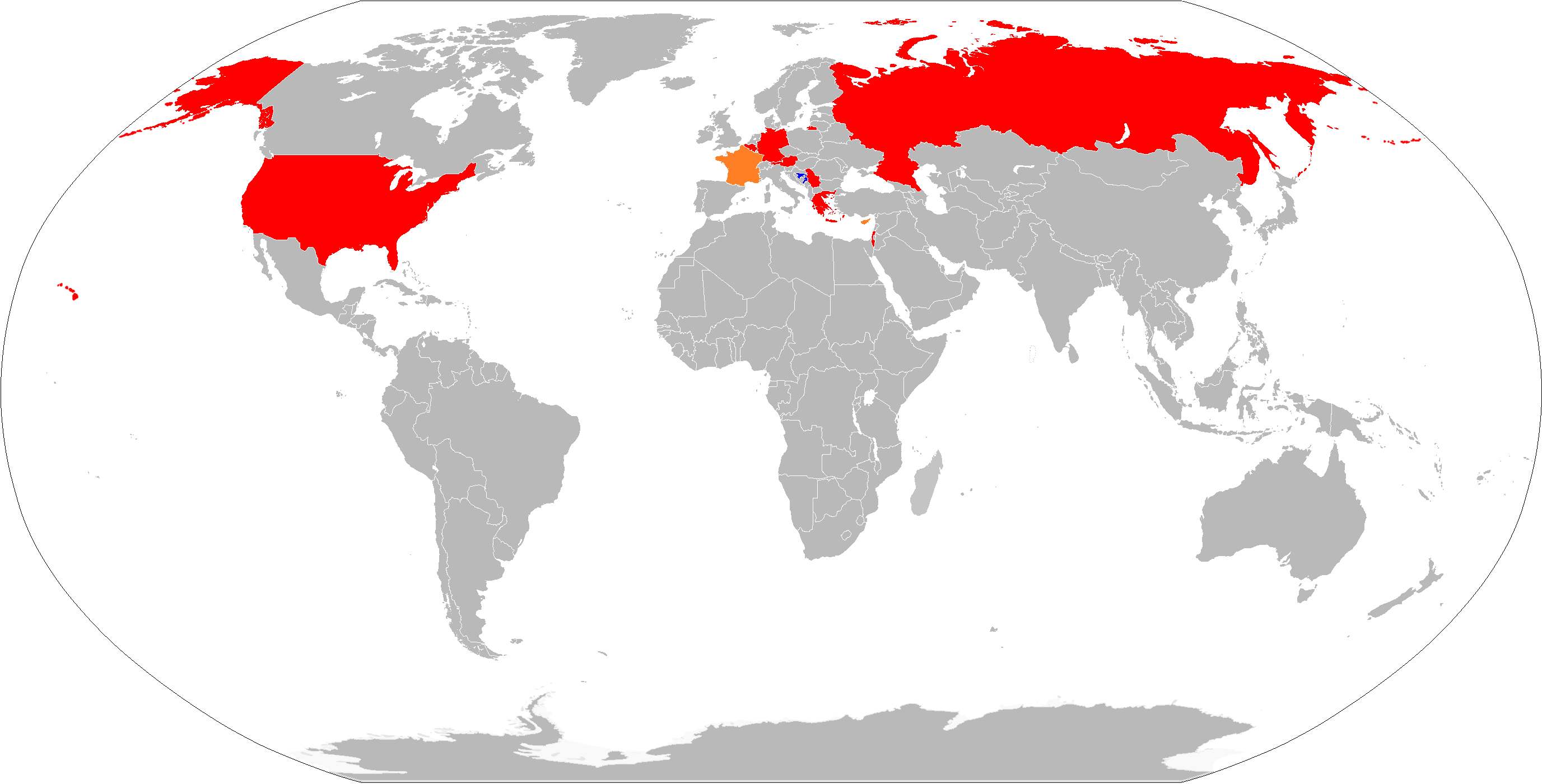
Representative offices of Republika Srpska worldwide

In February 2009, Republika Srpska opened a representative office in Brussels. While European Union representatives were not present at the ceremony, top Republika Srpska officials attended the event, saying it would advance their economic, political and cultural relations with the EU. This notion has been strongly condemned by Bosniak leaders, saying that this is further proof of Republika Srpska distancing itself from Bosnia and Herzegovina. The president of Republika Srpska, Rajko Kuzmanović, told reporters that this move did not jeopardise Republika Srpska's place within Bosnia and Herzegovina. He added that Republika Srpska merely used its constitutional right 'to open up a representation office in the centre of developments of European relevance'. Republika Srpska maintains official offices in Belgrade, Moscow, Stuttgart, Jerusalem, Thessaloniki, Washington D.C., Brussels, and Vienna.

Tourist arrivals in Republika Srpska
Year	Total number	Increase	Participation in BiH tourism	Overnight stays	Increase	Participation in BiH tourism
1997	108.009		44%	362.243		50%
1998	148.175	37.1%	49%	437.736	20.8%	52%
1999	168.375	13.6%	43%	473.705	8.2%	51%
2000	169.720	0.8%	41%	440.760	−7%	47%
2001	146.133	−13.9%	35%	359.890	−18.3%	40%
2002	151.838	3.9%	34%	384.187	6.8%	33%
2003	152.441	0.4%	33%	391.995	2%	28%
2004	151.280	−0.8%	31%	407.749	4%	26%
2005	150.526	0.5%	30%	397.976	−2.4%	23%
2006	191.934	27.5%	33%	489.441	23%	24%
2007	222.739	16%	34%	561.995	14.8%	24%
2008	241.145	8.2%	32%	625.842	11.4%	23%
2009	226.957	−5.8%	29%	564.091	−9.9%	22%
2010	236.286	4.1%	30%	577.802	2.4%	21%
2011	237.794	0.6%	29%	614.637	6.3%	22%
2012	241.214	1.4%	29%	629.648	2.4%	21%
2013	253.653	5.1%	26%	629.663	0%	20%
2014	260.160	2.6%	30%	598.668	5%	20%
2015	294.781	13.3%	28%	686.944	14.8%	21%
2016	323.908	9.9%	27%	740.601	7.8%	20%
2017	344.659	6.4%	24%	794.543	7.2%	19%
2018	381.802	10.7%	21%	926.939	16.7%	18%
2019	400.268	4.8%	25%	972.855	5.0%	29%
2020	190.271	-52.5%	38%	531.447	-45%	43%
2021	295.038	55.1%	30%	748.275	40.8%	33%
2022	439.781	49.1%	30%	1.036.569	38.5%	32%
2023	481.041	9.4%	28%	1.112.306	7.3%	30%
2024	493.257	2.5%		1.176.689	5.8%	
2025	514.740	4.4%		1.207.068	2.6%	

== Culture ==
The Academy of Sciences and Arts of Republika Srpska is the most important scientific, cultural, working and representative institution of Republika Srpska. The task of this academic institution is to develop, promote and encourage scientific and artistic activity. The academy is an institution of special national interest for the Republika Srpska.

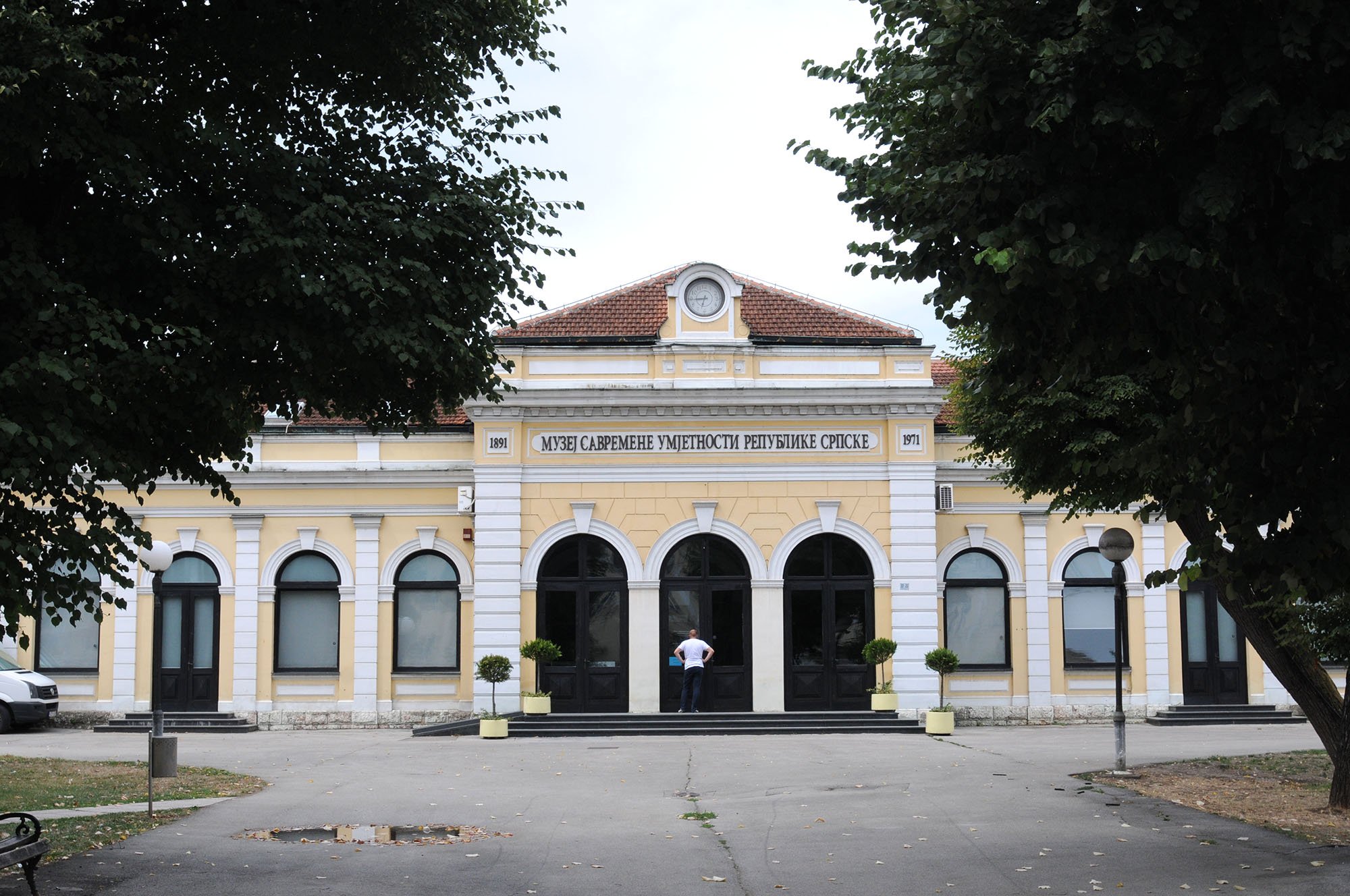
Museum of Contemporary Art, Republika Srpska

An important carrier of the development of dramatic art in Banja Luka and in the whole region is the National Theater of the Republic of Srpska. One of the most important and the most visited cultural events in the city is the Theater Fest, which is held every year in this theater, with the participation of numerous ensembles of domestic and foreign actors.

The National and University Library of Republika Srpska is the central library of the University of Banja Luka, the main library of all public universities in Republika Srpska and the main depository for all publications in Republika Srpska.

The Republic Institute for the Protection of Cultural, Historical and Natural Heritage is the official administrative institution of the Republika Srpska and an organization within the Ministry of Education and Culture of the Republika Srpska. The Institute registers, protects and maintains a central register of cultural, historical and natural monuments throughout the territory of the Republika Srpska.

In 1993, the Association of Serbian Writers was founded in Jahorina, under the chairmanship of professor and politician Nikola Koljevic. Since 2003, the president of the association has been Zoran Kostic, who moved its headquarters from Serbian Sarajevo to Banja Luka. The president of the Sarajevo-Romanija-Drina branch is Nedeljko Zelenović.

The founding assembly of the Association of Historians of the Republic of Srpska "Milorad Ekmečić" was held in Banja Luka in December 2015. The objectives of the Association are the improvement of scientific research activities in the field of historical science in the Republic of Srpska and dissemination of these results, improvement of history teaching and professional development of teaching staff.

=== Sport ===
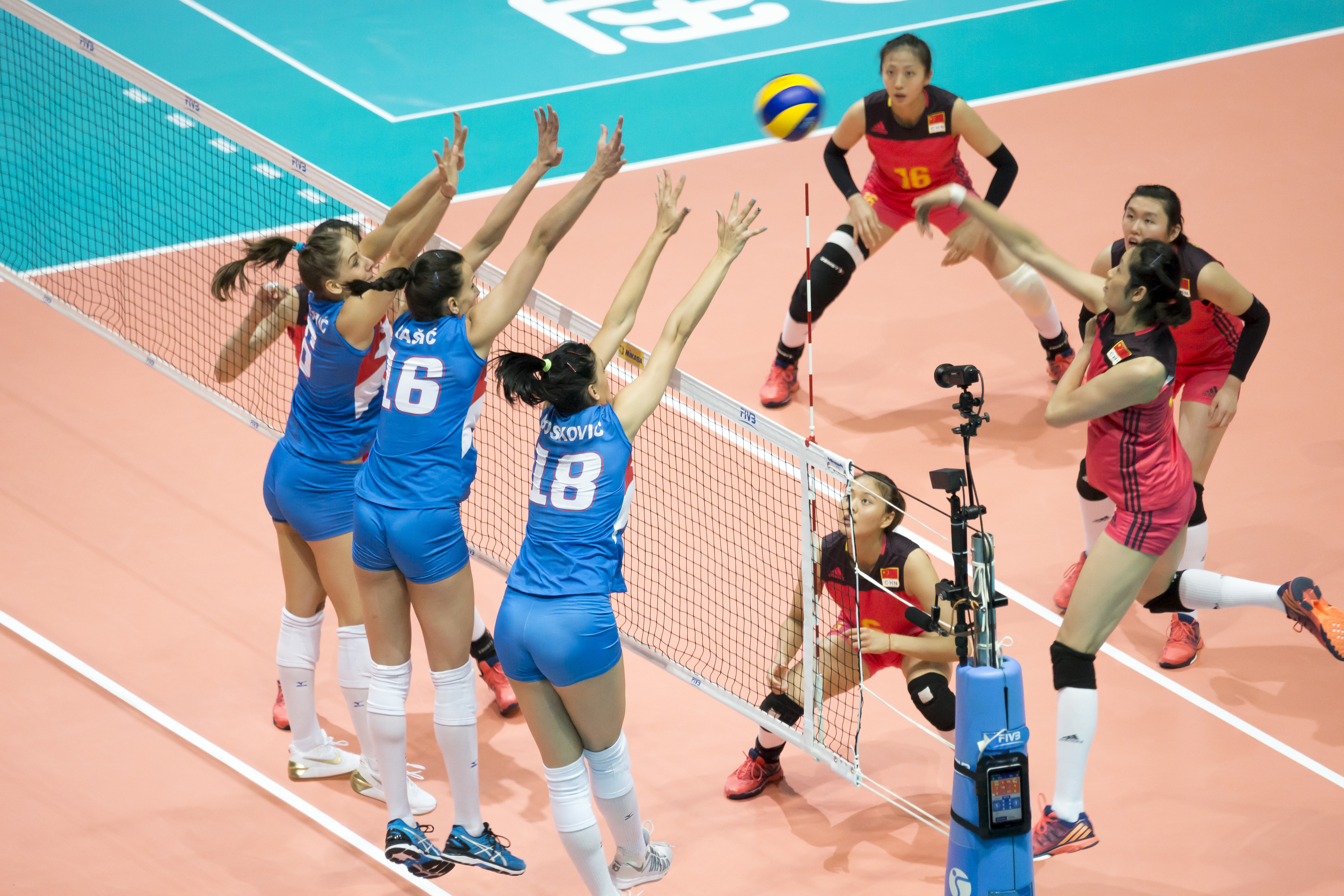
Tijana Bošković playing for the Serbia women's national volleyball team

Sport in Republika Srpska is managed by the entity's Ministry of Youth, Family, and Sport. The most popular sports in the entity include basketball, football, and volleyball. The most popular football club, and generally the largest sports organization, is FK Borac Banja Luka. FK Borac has, especially concerning the former Yugoslavia, experienced considerable success: it has won the Premier League of Bosnia and Herzegovina four times (most recently in 2025-26), the Bosnia and Herzegovina Cup in 2010, the Yugoslav Cup in 1988, and the Central European Cup in 1992, its last year. Other popular football clubs include FK Rudar Prijedor, FK Radnik Bijeljina, and FK Leotar, though these clubs face a considerable loss of talent to larger clubs of Serbia, Croatia, and the capital of Bosnia and Herzegovina, Sarajevo.

The oldest basketball club in Bosnia and Herzegovina, KK Borac, was founded in Banja Luka in 1947. The most successful sportspeoples born on the territory of present-day Republika Srpska are football players Tomislav Knez, Velimir Sombolac (1960 Olympics Champions) and Mehmed Baždarević (1976 Olympics Bronze medalist); handball players Đorđe Lavrnić, Milorad Karalić, Nebojša Popović (1972 Olympics Champions) and Zlatan Arnautović (1984 Olympics Champion); basketball players Ratko Radovanović (1980 Olympics Champion) and Slađana Golić (1988 Olympics Silver medalist); boxers Anton Josipović (1984 Olympics Champion), Slobodan Kačar (1980 Olympics Champion) and Tadija Kačar (1976 Olympics Silver medalist), table tennis player Jasna Fazlić (1988 Olympics Bronze medalist).

After the breakup of Yugoslavia, an especially large amount of successful athletes from Republika Srpska have chosen to represent Serbia (or former Serbia and Montenegro, FR Yugoslavia), such as basketball players Vladimir Radmanović (2002 World Champion), Saša Čađo (2015 European Champion and 2016 Olympic bronze medalist) and Ognjen Kuzmić (2015 NBA Champion, 2018 EuroLeague champion and 2017 EuroBasket silver medalist); volleyball players Tijana Bošković (2018 World Champion and 2016 Olympic silver medalist) and Saša Starović (2011 European Champion); football players Savo Milošević (2000 European Championship top scorer), Neven Subotić (two-time Bundesliga Champion), Mijat Gaćinović, Miladin Stevanović and Srđan Babić (2015 U-20 World Champions), Ognjen Ožegović (2013 U-19 European Champions) and Luka Jović. Other notable athletes are swimmer Velimir Stjepanović (2014 European Champions), taekwondo practitioner Zoran Prerad (1998 European Champion), judoka Nemanja Majdov (2017 World Champion) and alpine skier Jelena Lolović (2005 Universiade Champion).

=== Holidays ===
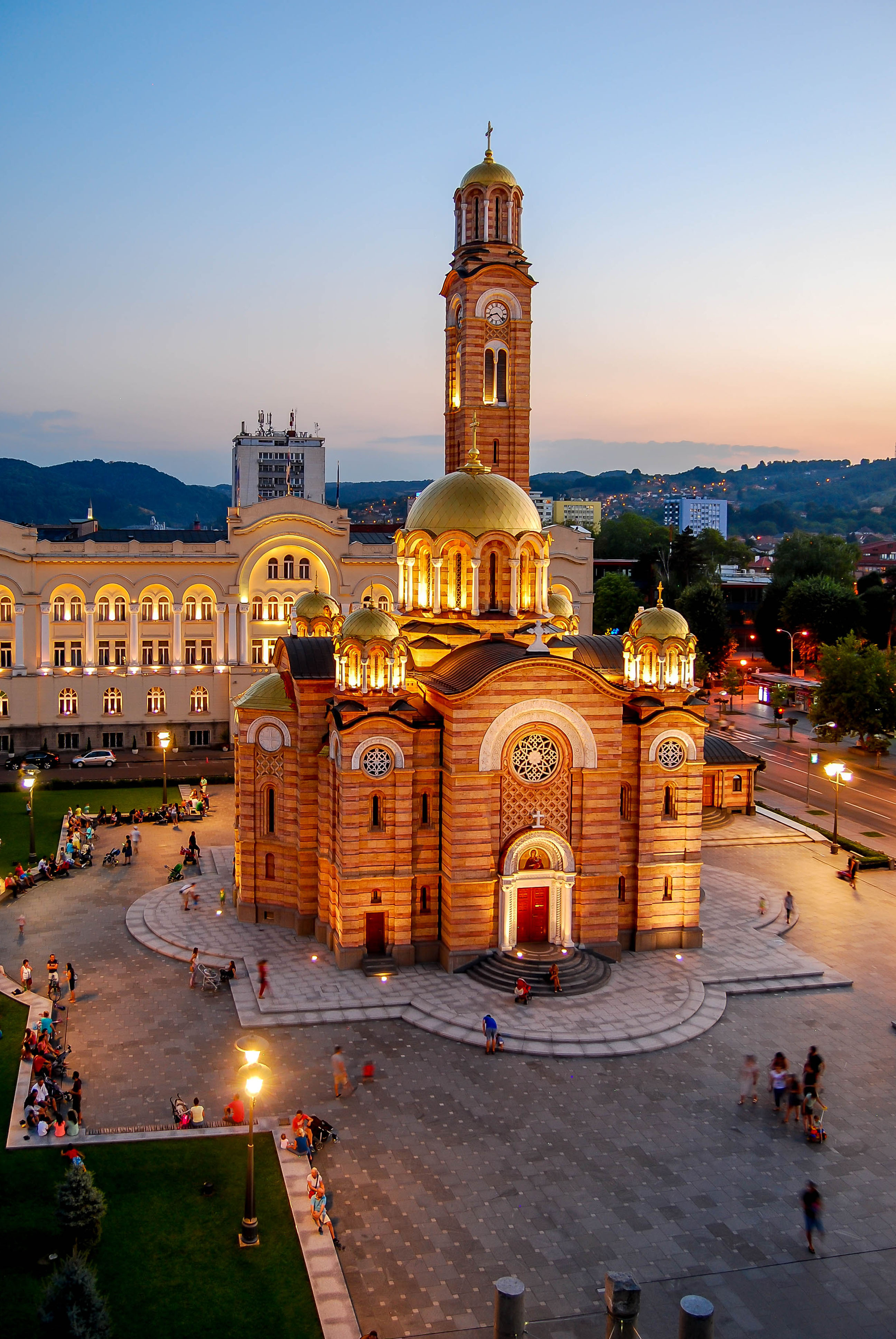
Cathedral of Christ the Saviour in Banja Luka

According to the Law on Holidays of Republika Srpska, public holidays are divided into three categories: entity holidays, religious holidays, and holidays which are marked but do not include time off work. The entity holidays include New Year's Day (1 January), Entity Day (9 January), International Workers' Day (1 May), Victory over Fascism Day (9 May), and Day of the General Framework Agreement for Peace in Bosnia and Herzegovina (21 November).

Religious holidays include Christmas and Easter according to both the Julian and the Gregorian calendars for, respectively, Serbian Orthodox Christians and Roman Catholics, as well as Kurban Bajram (Eid Al Adha) and Bajram (Eid Al Fitr) for Muslims. Holidays that are marked but do not include time off work include School Day (the Feast of Saint Sava, 27 January), Day of the Army of Republika Srpska (12 May), Interior Ministry Day (4 April), and Day of the First Serbian Uprising (14 February).

The most important of the entity holidays is the Day of Republika Srpska, which commemorates the establishment of Republika Srpska on 9 January 1992. Constitutional Court of Bosnia and Herzegovina declared the holiday unconstitutional on 26 November 2015, stating that the main issue for it being coinciding with a religious holiday. It coincides with Saint Stephen's Day according to the Julian calendar. The Orthodox Serbs also refer to the holiday as the slava of Republika Srpska, regarding Saint Stephen as the patron saint of the entity, although it is designated as a secular holiday. Republika Srpska does not recognise the Independence Day of Bosnia and Herzegovina (1 March).

== See also ==
- List of wars involving Republika Srpska
- Bosnian War
- Republika Srpska (1992–1995)

== Bibliography ==
- Bataković, Dušan T. (1996). The Serbs of Bosnia & Herzegovina: History and Politics. Dialogue Association. ISBN 9782911527104.
- Резултати пописа: градови, опшптине, насељена мјеста (PDF). Banja Luka: Republika Srpska Institute of Statistics. 2017.
