= Hrčavka =

River in Bosnia and Herzegovina

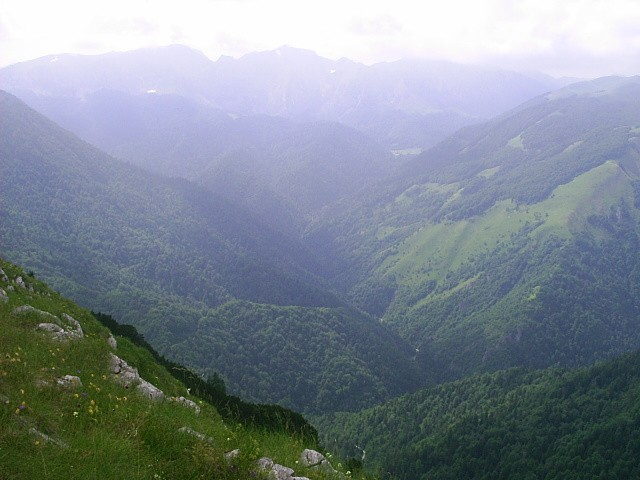
- Hrčavka valley

- Location within Bosnia and Herzegovina

Location
- Country: Bosnia and Herzegovina
- Municipality: Foča

Physical characteristics
- Source
  - location: Zelengora
  - coordinates: 43.355660°N 18.582238°E
- 2nd source
  - location: Zelengora
  - coordinates: 43.331382°N 18.578622°E
- Mouth
  - location: Šadići - Kruševo
  - coordinates: 43.367204°N 18.701972°E

Basin features
- Progression: Hrčavka→Sutjeska→Drina→Sava→Dunav
- River system: Drina
- Landmarks: Tođevac Fortress
- Cities: Tjentište
- Waterfalls: Skakavac

The Hrčavka is a river in the southeastern part of Bosnia and Herzegovina and is located in the municipality of Foča. It is the largest tributary of the Sutjeska. It flows along the Zelengora mountain and the Sutjeska National Park throughout its course.

It rises in a forested area at an altitude of 1,570 m, between the mountain ridges of Zelengora: Planika (1,795 m), Ljubina groba (1,815 m), Orlovača (1,960 m) and Kozje strane (2,014 m). It passes through a narrow canyon, and then flows into the Sutjeska River, at an altitude of 530 meters and a flow length of 13.5 km. The height difference from the source to the mouth is 1,030 meters, or a drop of 76.3 m/km of flow.

On the left bank of the Hrčavka River, opposite Milinklad, on steep cliffs, is the Tođevac fortress.

== Hrčavka Canyon ==
The Hrčavka Canyon is one of the most beautiful wild canyons and one of the last untouched places and prime destinations for canyoning in Europe. The narrow canyon of the Hrčavka River has many verticals (up to 10m), waterfalls, deep natural pools and water slides, making it a great place for sport and adventure.

=== Skakavac Waterfall ===
On its short course, numerous smaller watercourses join it. In the almost inaccessible canyon of Hrčavka, there is the Skakavac waterfall, with the same name as the more famous Skakavac waterfall in the nearby Perućica primeval forest. Water springs from an inaccessible rock and falls into the canyon from a height of 20 m.

Access to the Hrčavka Canyon is from the direction of Tjentište and Foča - Gacko road, from which a gravel road branches off just before Tjentište, leading to Lake Donje Bare. The canyon has only recently been explored, with the first commercial tours starting in 2014.

Some 2 km away from Hrčavka and Skakavc is the village of Tođevac, and high above on the cliffs is the eponymous medieval Bosnian fortress.

== Ecology ==
Hrčavka is rich in brown trout.

In August 2014, the Environmental Center Bosnia and Herzegovina, together with Arbor Magna and WWF, hired experts and organized a research expedition in the canyons of the Sutjeska and Hrčavka rivers, where 403 plant species were recorded in just five days. Based on the results of this expedition, the District Court in Banja Luka annulled the previously issued Decision on the approval of the Environmental Impact Study for small hydropower plants planned in the canyon of the Hrčavka River in the heart of the Sutjeska National Park, and ruled in favor of the Environmental Center.
