= Maglić (mountain) =

Highest mountain of Bosnia and Herzegovina

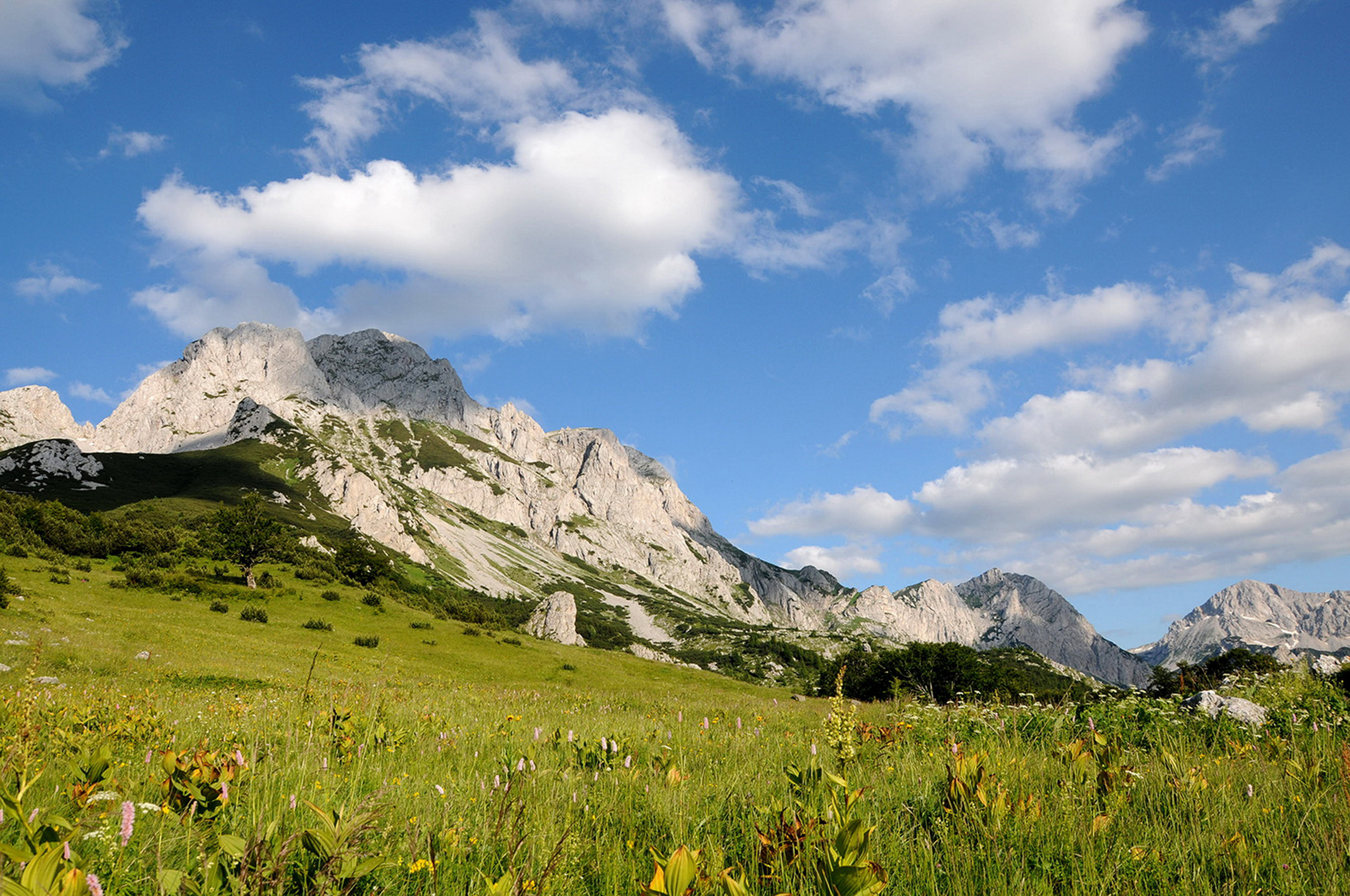
- View of Maglić's peak from Sutjeska National Park.

Highest point
- Elevation: 2,386 m (7,828 ft)
- Prominence: 51 m (167 ft)
- Isolation: 0.56 km (0.35 mi)
- Listing: Country high point
- Coordinates: 43°16′52″N 18°44′13″E

Geography
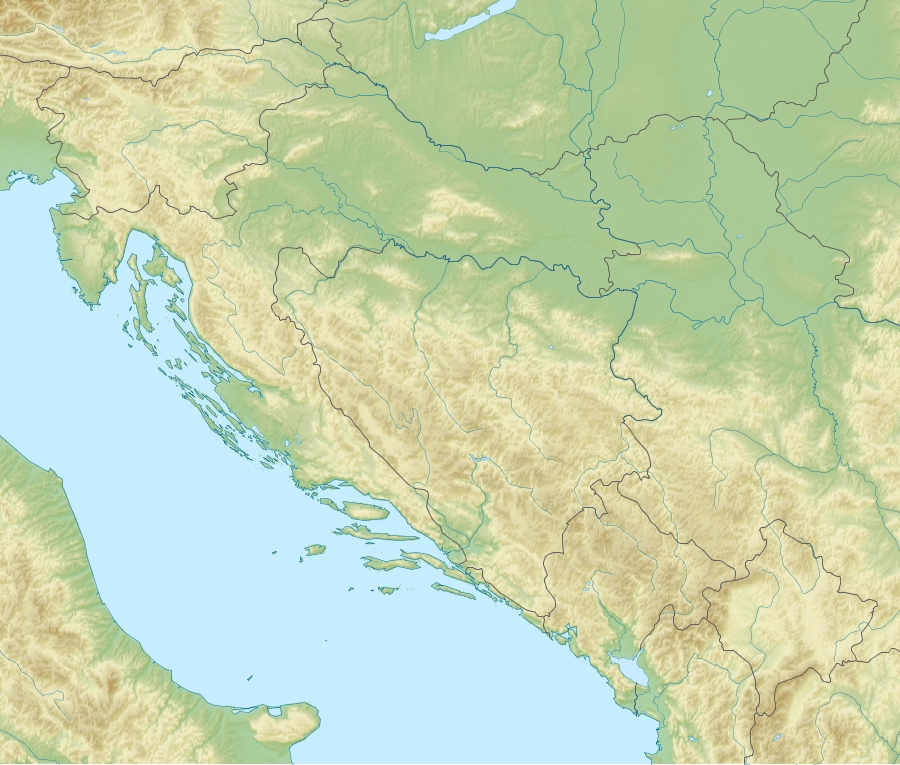
- Location within Dinaric Alps Location within Bosnia and Herzegovina Location within Montenegro
- Location: Bosnia and Herzegovina, Montenegro
- Parent range: Dinaric Alps

Geology
- Mountain type: Karst limestone

Maglić (Serbian Cyrillic: Маглић, pronounced [mǎɡliːtɕ]) is a transboundary mountain in the Dinaric Alps, on the border of Bosnia and Herzegovina and Montenegro.

Its highest peak has an elevation of 2,388 m (7,835 ft) and is located in Montenegro. The second, its twin, is the more visited of the two and has an elevation of 2,386 m (7,828 ft). It is located in Bosnia and Herzegovina and is the highest peak of the country. The mountain is oriented in a northwest–southeast direction.

== Geography ==
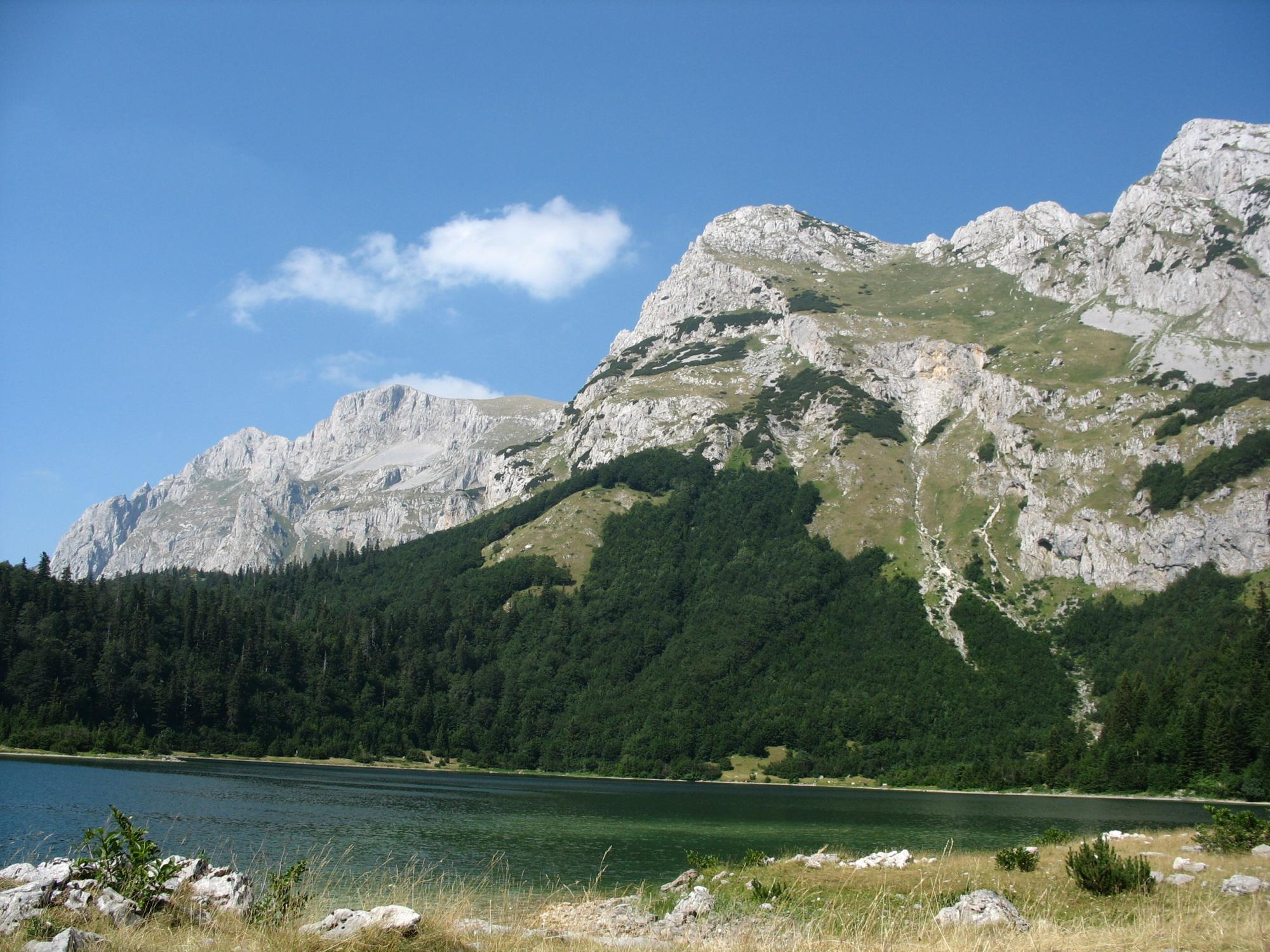
Trnovačko Lake bounded by Maglić

Maglić is the highest mountain in Bosnia and Herzegovina. It is bounded by the river Sutjeska to the west, the Piva to the east-southeast and the Upper Drina to the north-northeast, with the Vučevo plateau (1,862 m (6,109 ft)) extending to the north.

In Bosnia and Herzegovina, the nearest city is Foča, 20 km (12 mi) from the Maglić massif, while the nearest Montenegrin town is Mratinje. Karst limestone formations in the region of limestone plateau are the general geological setting in the south and southwest of the area.

The Maglić massif consists of two peaks, the Veliki Maglić (2,386 m (7,828 ft)) on the Bosnia and Herzegovina side and the Crnogorski Maglić (2,388 m (7,835 ft)) on the Montenegrin side. The Montenegrin part of the Maglić massif has formed the Trnovačko Lake, said to be "one of the most beautiful of Montenegro." This lake is a glacier lake at an elevation of 1,517 metres (4,977 ft), is 700 metres (2,300 ft) long and 400 metres (1,300 ft) wide. The lake is drained from the Maglić, the Volujak and the Bioč mountain ranges. The north side of the lake which is open has the wooded Vratnice. The lake water has green blue colour. The headwaters of Sutjeska River are in the canyon parts of Maglić Mountain. The mountain is bounded by the Sutjeska river on the north and west, by the Volujak mountain on the southwest, by the Drina River and Piva River on the east and by the Mratinjska Uvala valley on the south.

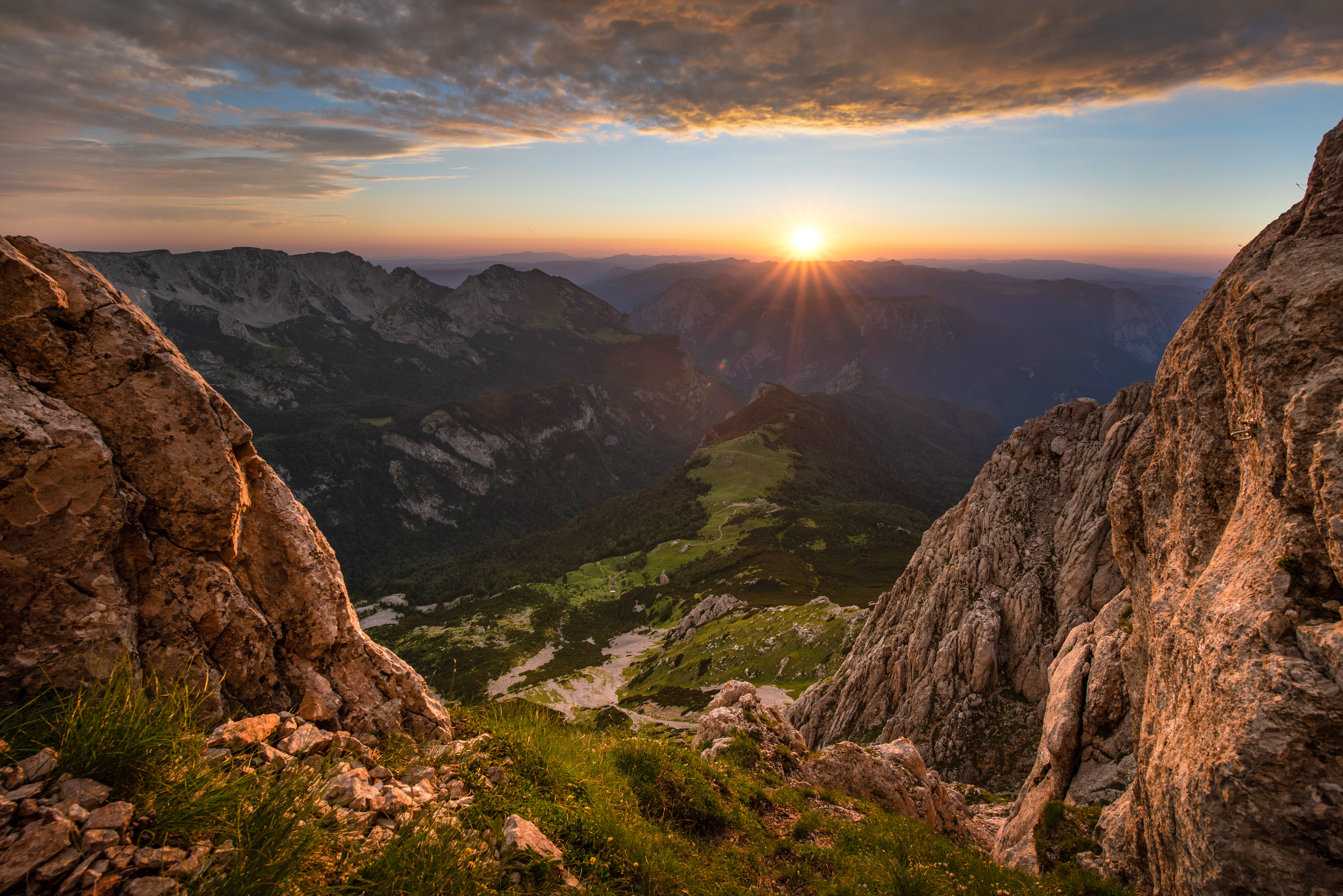
View

The rich forests on the mountainside consist of the Perućica forest, a protected reserve within the Sutjeska National Park, which is the oldest and one of the two last remaining primeval forests in Europe. The northwestern slope has thick coniferous and beech trees up to elevation 1,600 m (5,249 ft), while in the other directions the hill slopes are very steep, barren and rocky. Pastures are found at elevations above 1,600 metres (5,200 ft) in the plateaus. The mountain peak is accessible through the park and is visited by mountaineers and nature lovers. Most of the routes to the peak require two days of hiking. Mountaineering access to the summit of the Maglić massif is only from the southern side, which has rich vegetation of grass and mountain pine. From the top of the peak, are scenic vistas of Volujak, Bioč, Trnovačko Lake, Durmitor, apart from the Bosnian mountains in the north and northwestern direction which can be seen.

== Protection ==
Maglić is important feature of the Sutjeska National Park, which is the first national park within Bosnia and Herzegovina, established in 1962. The park is drained by the Sutjeska River, running through the valley of Tjentište.

== See also ==
- Dinaric Alps

== Bibliography ==
=== Alpinism ===
- Poljak, Željko (February 1959). "Maglić". Kazalo za "Hrvatski planinar" i "Naše planine" 1898—1958 (PDF). Naše planine (in Croatian). Vol. XI. pp. 21–22. ISSN 0354-0650.

=== Biology ===
- Šašić, Martina; Nahirnić, Ana; Tarmann, Gerhard M. (31 December 2016). "Zygaenidae (Lepidoptera) in the Lepidoptera collections of the Croatian Natural History Museum". Natura Croatica: Periodicum Musei Historiae Naturalis Croatici. 25 (2): 233–248. doi:10.20302/NC.2016.25.19. eISSN 1848-7386.
