= Lelija =

Mountain range in Bosnia and Herzegovina

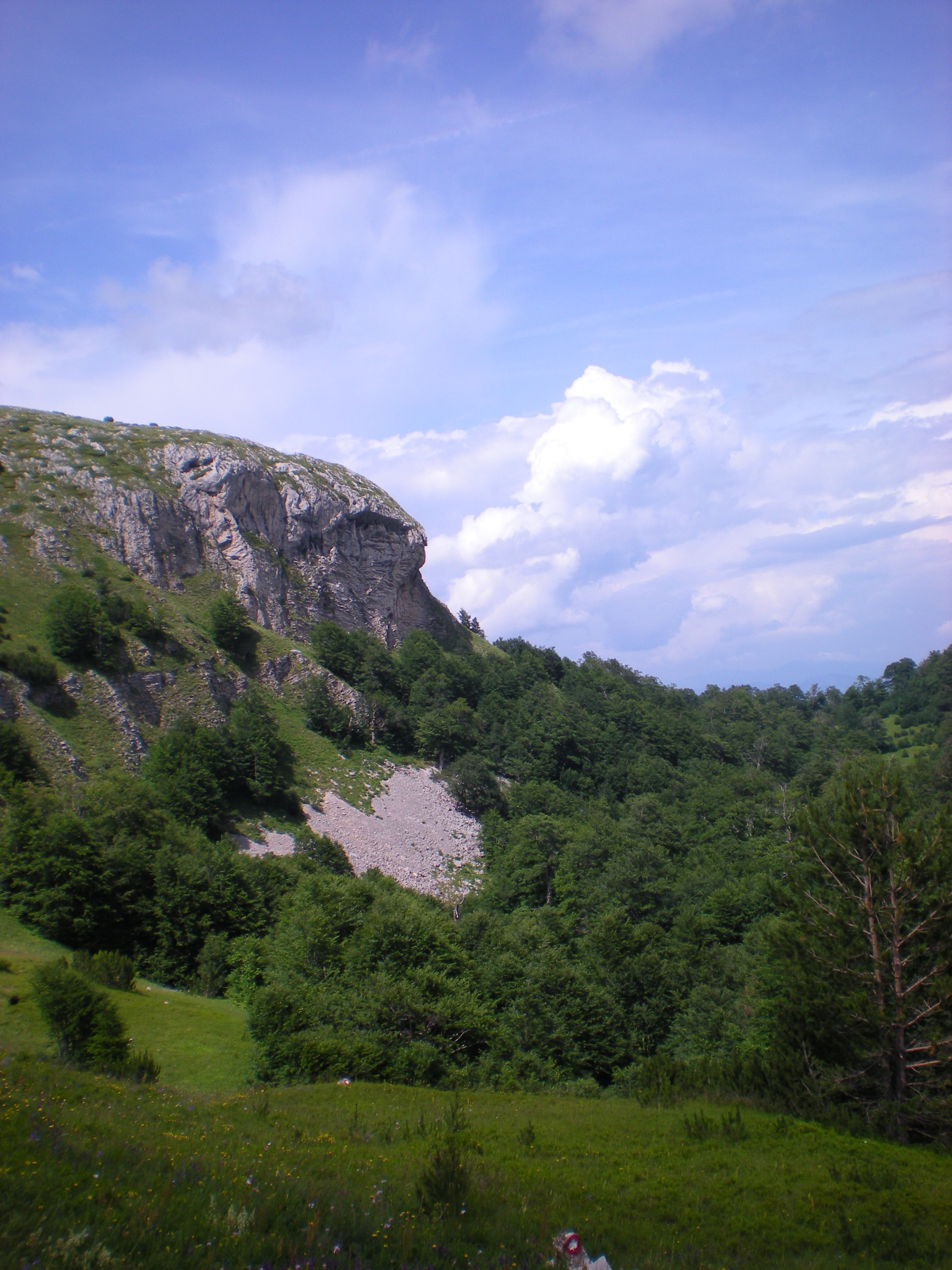

Highest point
- Elevation: 2,032 m (6,667 ft)
- Coordinates: 43.423°N 18.488°E

Geography
- Location within Bosnia and Herzegovina
- Location: Bosnia and Herzegovina
- Parent range: Dinaric Alps

Lelija (Serbian Cyrillic: Лелија) is a mountain range within the Sutjeska National Park, Bosnia and Herzegovina. It has an altitude of 2,032 metres (6,667 ft). Geographically, it is part of the Dinaric Alps of southern Bosnia and Herzegovina, located south of Kalinovik, within the territory of the Republika Srpska. Geologically, the Lelija range is part of the Dinaric Alps and formed largely of secondary and tertiary sedimentary rock, mostly limestone and dolomite. Lelija is bordered by the Jezernica in the north, the Drina in the east, the Neretva in the west and Zelengora range in the south. Notable peaks are Velika Lelija (2032 m.), Todor (1949 m.), and Saikov Vrh (1562 m.)

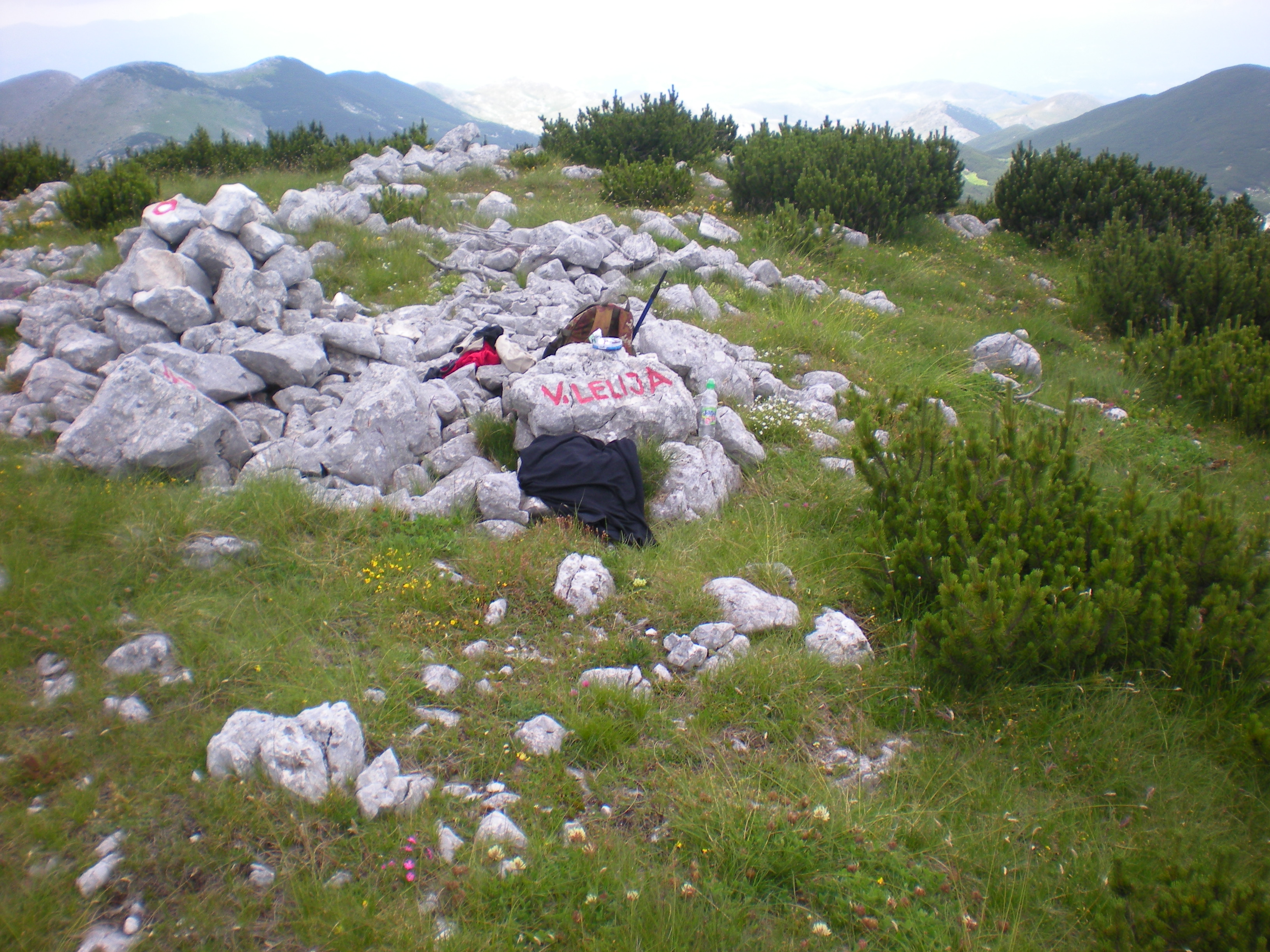
V. Lelija summit

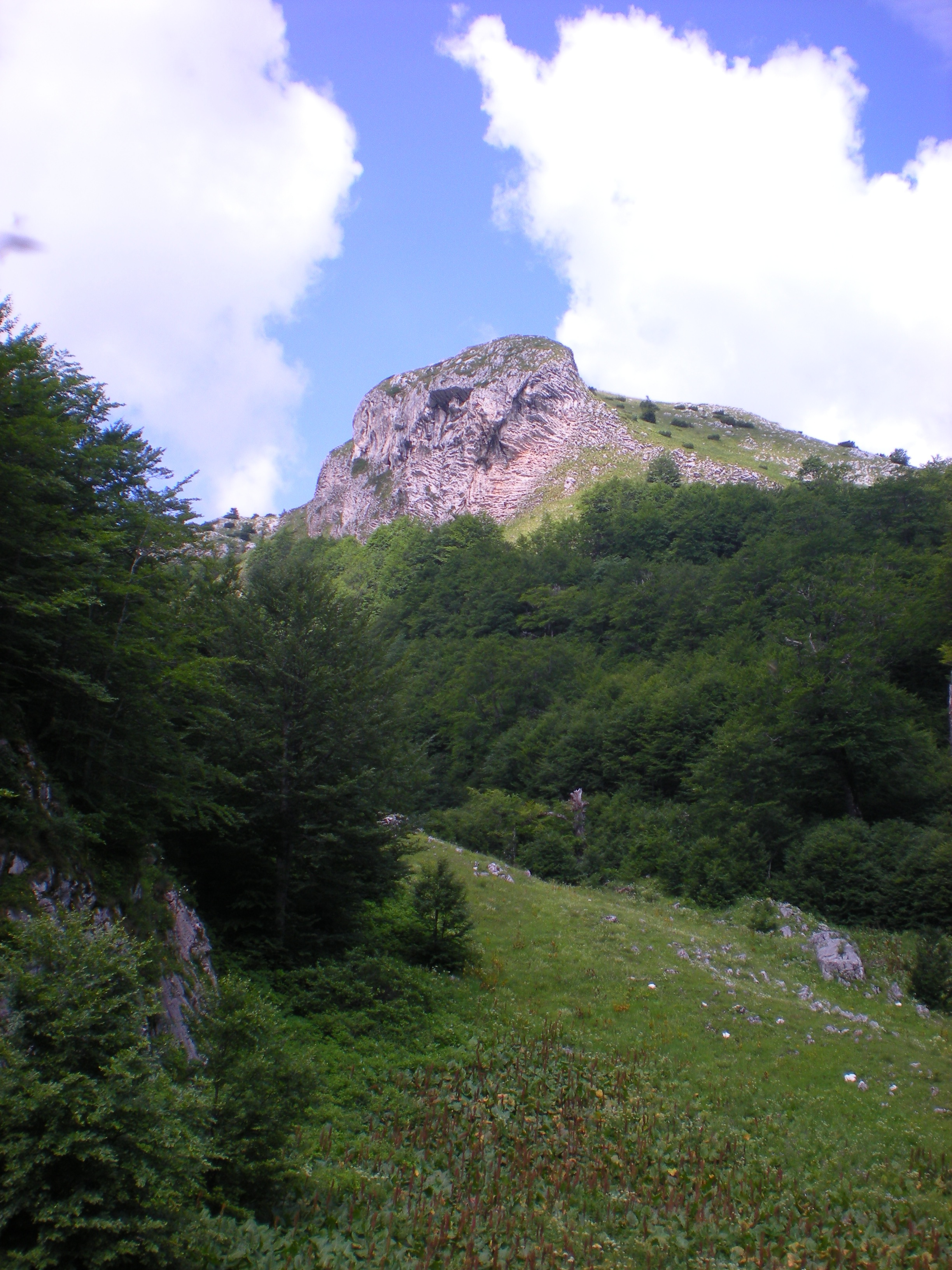
Jablan Vrelo

The Lelija mountains were not part of the frontline during the 1992-'95 conflict and therefore have virtually no contamination with land mines and unexploded ordnance. Therefore, Lelija is a destination for hikers and tour skiers. The slopes of Lelija are covered with mixed forest up to an altitude of ca. 1400 m., thick shrubs of Pinus Mugo grow further up. A rough unpaved mountain road passes from Kalinovik and Jelašca north-south through the Lelija range and further through Zelengora. A mountain house used to be located at Jablan Vrelo, a spring on the trail to Velika Lelija summit, but it has long fallen into oblivion. What remains is a beautiful hike in an area that doesn't see many visitors.
