= Skakavac Waterfall (Perućica) =

Waterfall on the Perućica

Skakavac
- Скакавац
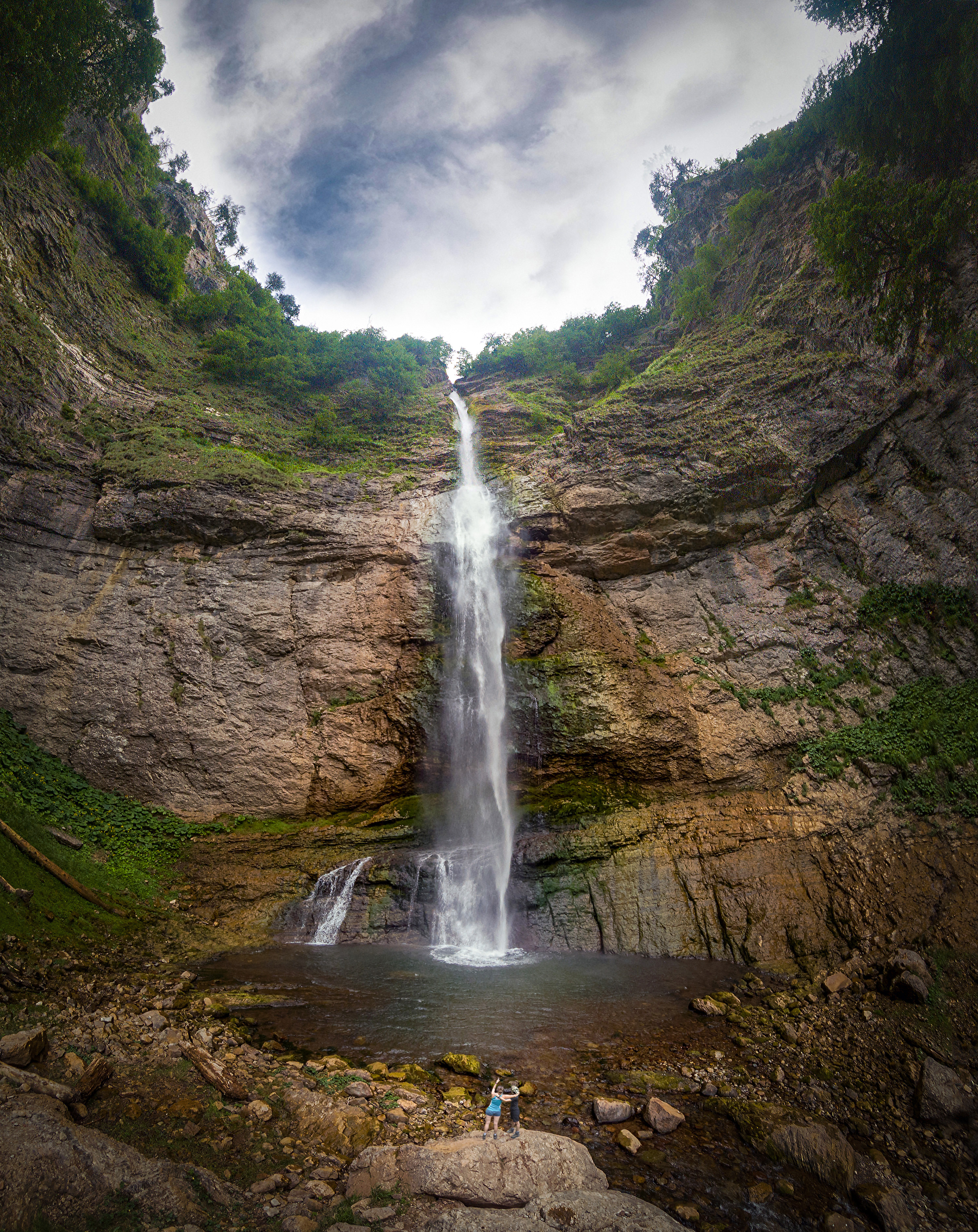

- Location within Bosnia and Herzegovina
- Location: Perućica, Bosnia and Herzegovina
- Coordinates: 43°18′43.32″N 18°42′2.23″E
- Total height: 75 metres (246 ft)
- Watercourse: Perućica Creek

Skakavac (Serbian Cyrillic: Скакавац, lit. "grasshopper") is a waterfall formed on the Perućica, a mountain creek, in the Perućica, which is regulated as a Strict Nature Reserve as part of Sutjeska National Park in Bosnia and Herzegovina. It is one of the highest waterfalls in the country, at about 75 metres (246 ft) in height.

The Perućica primeval forest of beech and spruce is situated beneath Maglić (2,386 m), the highest peak in Bosnia and Herzegovina, and separated from Zelengora mountain by the canyon of the Sutjeska river. Perućica creek cuts through the Perućica forest and descends between two steep Maglić slopes. Near the middle of its course, the stream cascades from the upper hanging valley to the lower valley, falling 75 meters from a karstic limestone precipice to reach its confluence with the Sutjeska river in the valley of Tjentište.

== See also ==
- List of waterfalls in Bosnia and Herzegovina
