= Sutjeska =

Sutjeska may refer to:

- Sutjeska (river), a river in Bosnia and Herzegovina
- Sutjeska, a bus stop in front of the Druga Gimnazija in Sarajevo.
- Sutjeska National Park, a national park in Bosnia and Herzegovina
- Battle of Sutjeska, a World War II battle in Yugoslavia
- The Battle of Sutjeska (film), a 1973 Yugoslav film
- Kraljeva Sutjeska, a settlement in Bosnia and Herzegovina
- Sutjeska Nikšić, a multi-sport club from Nikšić, Montenegro
  - FK Sutjeska Nikšić, football team
  - KK Sutjeska Nikšić, basketball team
  - RK Sutjeska Nikšić, handball team
- Sutjeska Foča, a multi-sport club from Foča, Bosnia and Herzegovina
  - FK Sutjeska Foča, a football team
- Sutjeska, Sečanj, a village in Serbia
- Sutjeska (Zemun), a neighbourhood in Belgrade, Serbia
