= Kotlaničko Lake =

Kotlaničko Lake Kotlaničko jezero
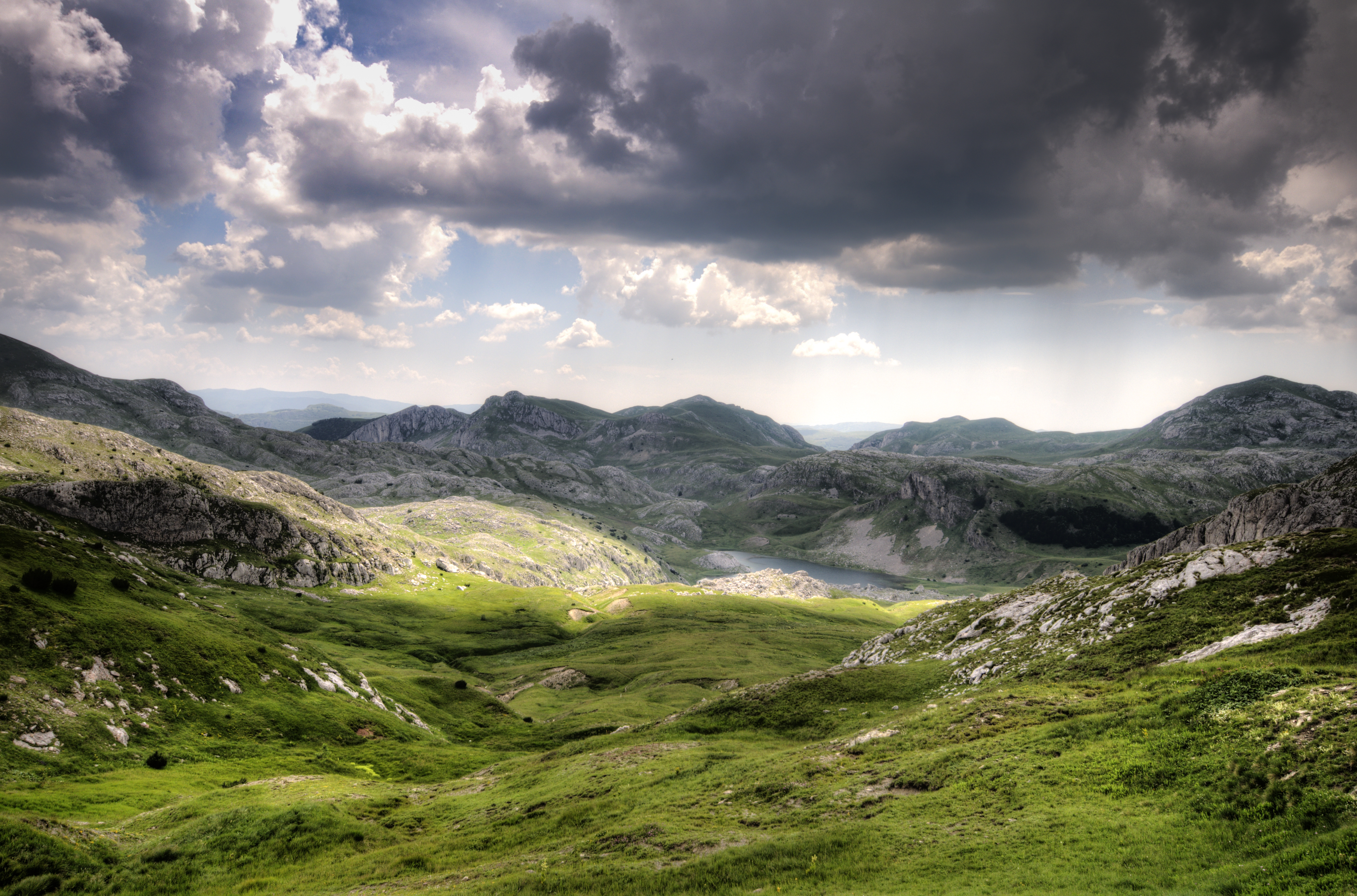

- Location within Bosnia and Herzegovina
- Interactive map of Kotlaničko Lake; Kotlaničko jezero
- Location: Sutjeska National Park, Bosnia and Herzegovina
- Coordinates: 43°21′41.4″N 18°29′1.68″E
- Type: Glacial lake

Kotlaničko Lake (Serbian: Котланичко jезеро, romanized: Kotlaničko jezero) is a lake of Bosnia and Herzegovina in Sutjeska National Park. It is located in the municipality of Zelengora.

== See also ==
- List of lakes in Bosnia and Herzegovina
