= Europarc =

Europarc may refer to:

- Europarc, Grimsby an industrial estate in Healing, Lincolnshire serving Grimsby
- EUROPARC Federation, a federation of nature and national parks in Europe, an independent, non-governmental organisation
- XEROX Europarc, a European branch of the Xerox PARC research center
- Europarc, a commercial complex in Salzburg, Austria designed by Massimiliano Fuksas
- Rosyth Europarc, a business park in Rosyth
