= Volujak (mountain) =

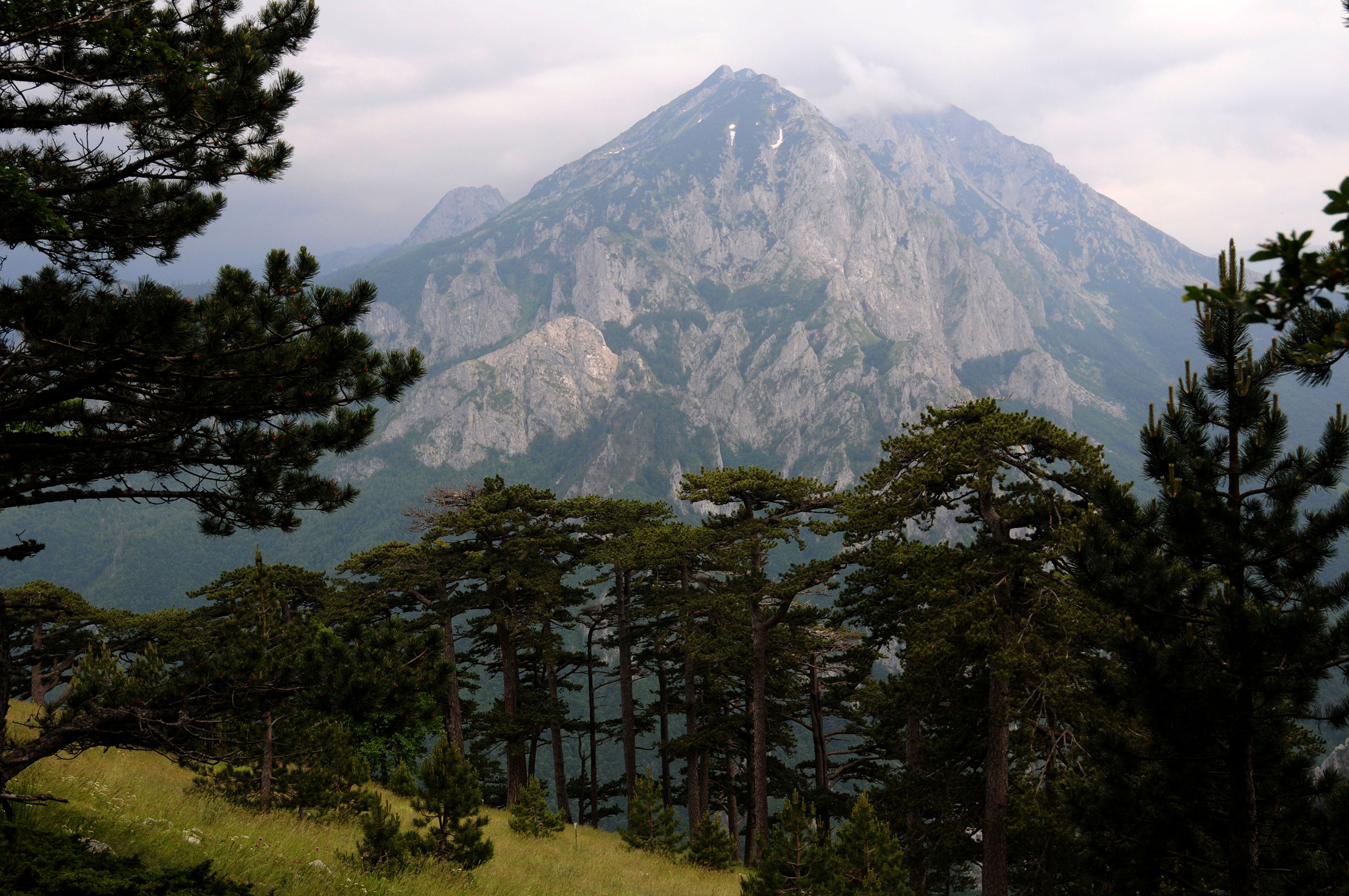
- Volujak summit inside Sutjeska National Park.

Highest point
- Elevation: 2,336 m (7,664 ft)
- Coordinates: 43°13′55″N 18°43′01″E

Geography
- Location within Bosnia and Herzegovina
- Location: Bosnia and Herzegovina; Montenegro
- Parent range: Dinaric Alps

Volujak (Serbian Cyrillic: Волујак) is a mountain range on the border of Bosnia and Herzegovina and Montenegro. Geologically, Volujak is a subrange of the Dinaric Alps and formed largely of secondary and tertiary sedimentary rock, mostly limestone and dolomite. It basically forms a long ridge on the southwest side of the Suhja valley, with the border between Bosnia-Herzegovina and Montenegro running alongside this ridge, where a sharp corner of BiH territory reaches into Montenegro. It is on the BiH side located within the Sutjeska National Park but has a protected status also on the Montenegrin side. Notable peaks are Volujak (2,337 metres (7,667 ft)), Studenac (2,296 metres (7,533 ft)), Badnjine (2,245 metres (7,365 ft)) and Trnovački Durmitor (2,232 metres (7,323 ft)). Right at the northern foot of this last peak is the beautiful Trnovačko Lake situated. The Volujak range borders north-east on the Suhja valley and Maglić, on the south west side on the Izgori valley and the Lebršnik mountain group, in the north west by the Sutjeska (river) valley and on the south east side by the Bioč range. Volujak peak is the second highest elevation point in Bosnia Herzegovina. From its summit hikers obtain an impressive view of the surrounding peaks: Maglić, Veliko Vitao and, in the distance, Durmitor.

== Toponymy ==
There seems to be fair amount of confusion regarding the toponymy of this remote mountain range. Some argue that the most southern part of the range, including Volujak summit and Trnovački Durmitor should be regarded as a separate mountain range by the name of Vlasulja. Studenac would be the highest point of Volujak range and Volujak peak would be the highest point of Vlasulja. Others refer to Volujak peak as Vlasulja. Recent writers regard the massive, geologically uniform ridge as one single subrange of the Dinaric Alps and refer to it by the name of Volujak.

== Hiking ==
The Volujak mountains were never affected by heavy combat during the 1992-1995 conflict and mine risk is therefore minimal. Volujak is a relatively wild and remote place though, so hikers should be well prepared. As the approach towards the main peaks of the Volujak range from either sides crosses the international border between BiH and Montenegro a valid passport should be carried. The international border here was established after the Austro-Hungarian Empire occupied Bosnia following the Congress of Berlin in 1878. The Austrians installed a Triangulation device on the summit of Volujak Peak. The pedestal of that device can still be found on the Volujak summit. A rich fauna exists around these mountains. There are several bears that roam the slopes of Volujak. Chamois and large eagles are very likely to be observed in this area. The horses that roam around at Volujak are not wild, but certainly seem to know how to survive without regular supervision.
