= List of waterfalls in Bosnia and Herzegovina =

This is a list of waterfalls in Bosnia and Herzegovina:

- Bliha Falls – 56 metres (184 ft)
- Čeveljuša
- Duboka
- Duščica - Ljubunačka Rijeka (a.k.a. Duščica), Prozor-Rama
- Ilomska waterfalls
- Koćuša
- Kravica – 25 metres (82 ft)
- Movran (Mali)
- Movran (Veliki)
- Pliva Waterfall – 22 metres (72 ft)
- Skakavac – Mrkonjić Grad
- Skakavac – Nevačka village, Han Pijesak
- Skakavac – Perućica, 75 metres (246 ft)
- Skakavac – Sarajevo, 98 metres (322 ft)
- Šištica
- Štrbački buk – 24 metres (79 ft)
- Ugrić
