= Trnovačko Lake =

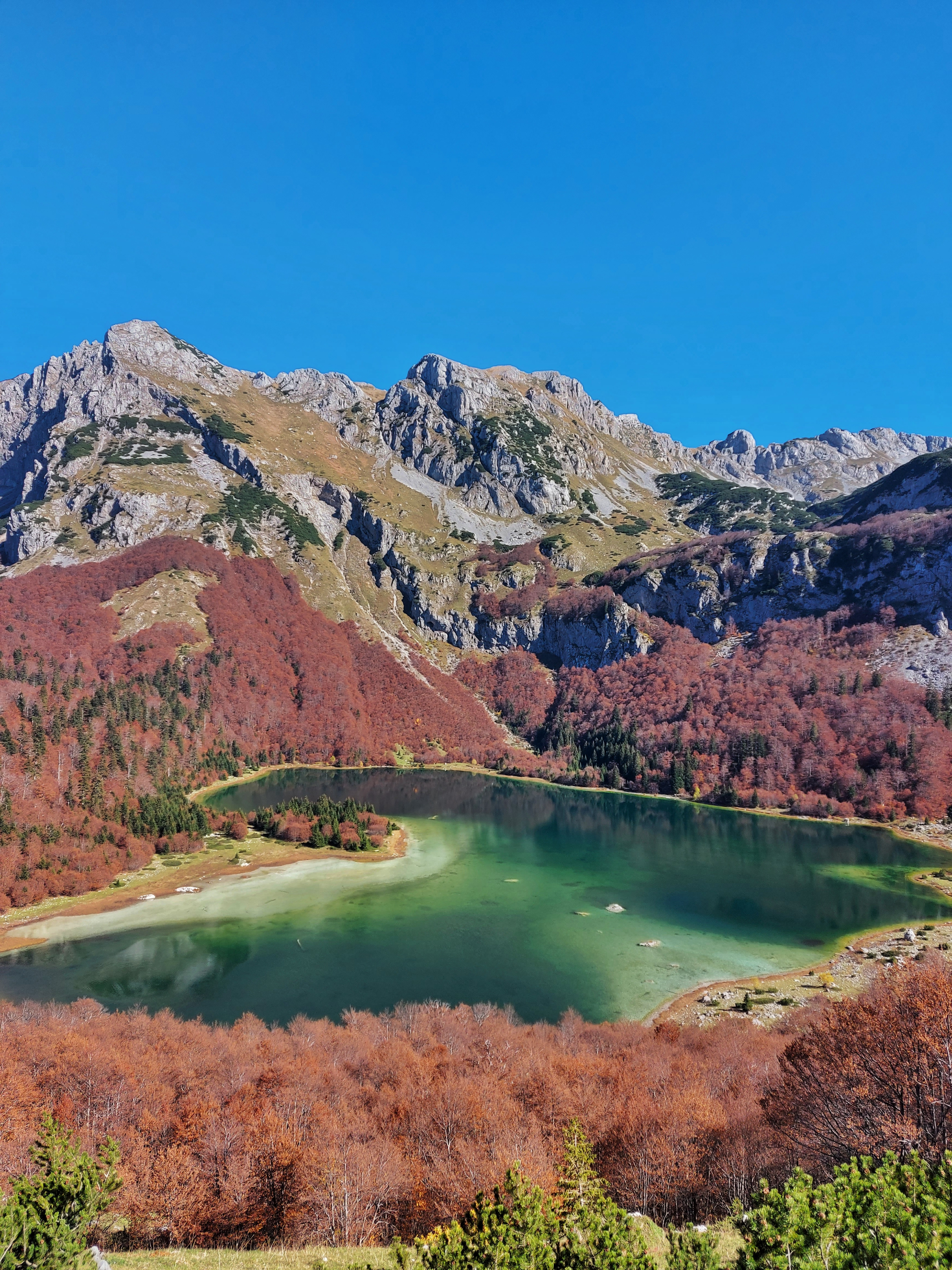

- Location within Montenegro
- Interactive map of Trnovačko Lake
- Location: Montenegro
- Coordinates: 43°15′06″N 18°43′36″E
- Type: lake
- Max. length: 700 metres (2,300 ft)
- Max. width: 400 metres (1,300 ft)
- Surface elevation: 1,517 m (4,977 ft)

Trnovačko Lake (Serbian: Трновачко језеро, romanized: Trnovačko jezero) is a lake in northern Montenegro, best known for its heart-like shape. Located at an altitude of 1517 metres, it is popular with local summer campers.

== Geography and hydrology ==
The lake is drained from the Maglić, the Volujak and the Bioč mountain ranges. The north side of the lake which is open has the wooded Vratnice. The lake water has a deep green-blue colour. It is 700 metres (2,300 ft) long and 400 metres (1,300 ft) wide set amidst a "huge amphitheater of rocky peaks".

== Transboundary park ==
The plan is to form a national park within the borders of Montenegro, which should protect rest of the mountain range of Magilć-Volujak-Bioč and Trnovačko Lake. This new park and a Sutjeska National Park across the border in neighboring Bosnia and Herzegovina should form one large transboundary protection zone.
