= Trebova Planina =

Mountain in Bosnia and Herzegovina

Trebova
- Trebova Planina
- Location within Bosnia and Herzegovina

Highest point
- Elevation: 1,872 m (6,142 ft)
- Coordinates: 43°23′8.06″N 18°37′4.51″E

Geography
- Location: Bosnia and Herzegovina
- Parent range: Dinaric Alps

Trebova Planina (Serbian Cyrillic: Требова) is a mountain in Zelengora mountain range in the Sutjeska National Park in the municipality of Foča, Republika Srpska, Bosnia and Herzegovina. It has an altitude of 1,872 metres (6,142 ft).

== See also ==
- List of mountains in Bosnia and Herzegovina
