= Sutjeska National Park =

National park in Bosnia and Herzegovina

- IUCN category II (national park)
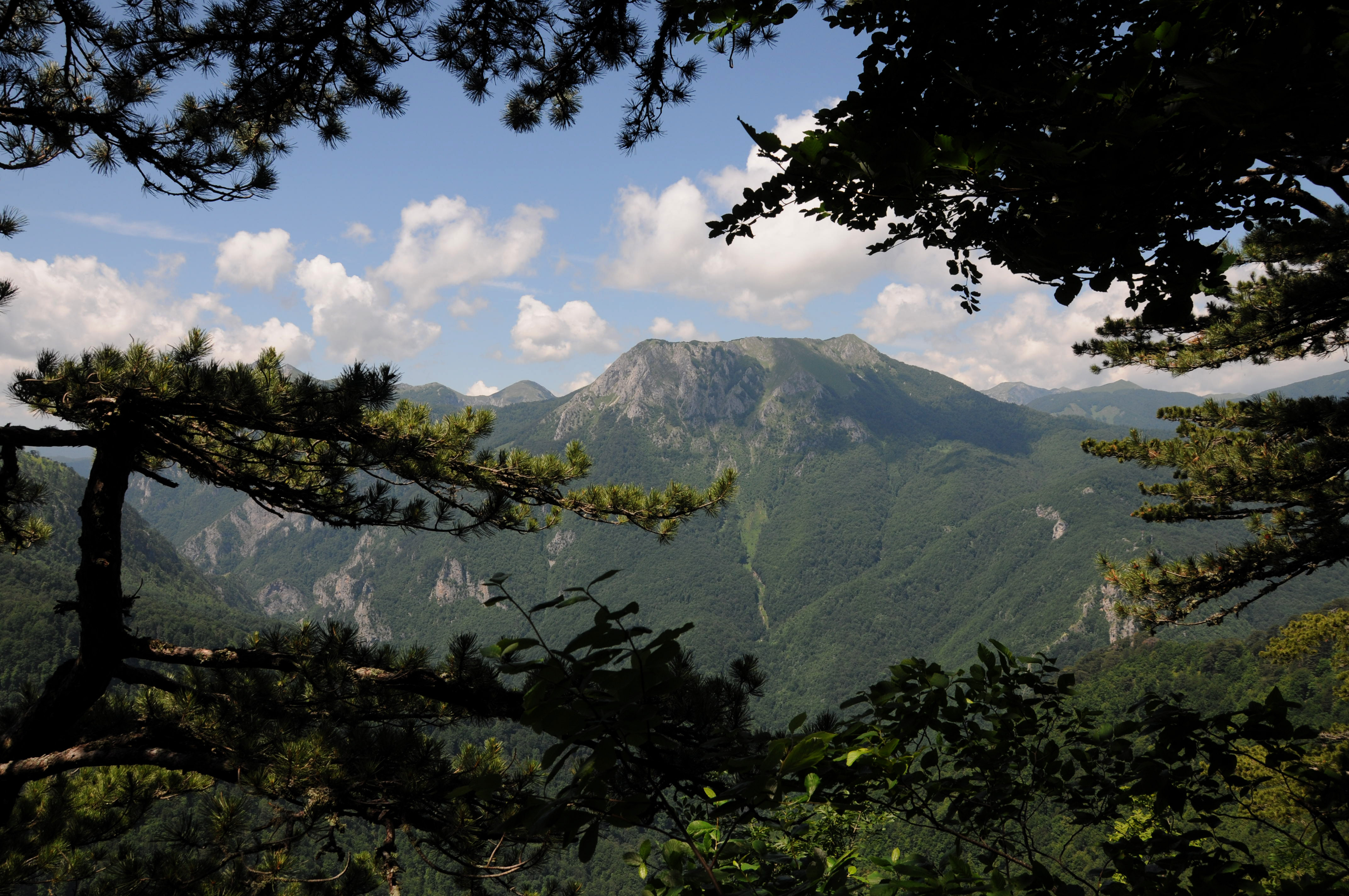

- Location within Bosnia and Herzegovina
- Location: Bosnia and Herzegovina
- Nearest city: Foča
- Coordinates: 43°20′N 18°41′E
- Area: 160.52 km^{2} (61.98 sq mi)
- Established: 1962

The Sutjeska National Park (Serbo-Croatian: Nacionalni park Sutjeska, Национални парк Сутјеска, pronounced [sûtjɛska]) is a national park located in Bosnia and Herzegovina. Established in 1962, it is Bosnia and Herzegovina's oldest national park. It includes the country's highest peak of Maglić, at over 2,386 metres (7,828 ft), on the border with Montenegro. The Montenegrin part of Maglić massif in the park has also formed the Trnovačko Jezero (Trnovačko Lake). The Strict Nature Reserve "Perućica", one of the last two remaining primeval forests in Europe, is part of the park. The park is also famous as being the location of the Battle of the Sutjeska in 1943 during World War II. It is an affiliated member of EUROPARC Federation.

== History ==
The park was established in 1962, and is the largest and the earliest declared national park in Bosnia and Herzegovina. Its declaration was based more on it being the site of historic battles rather than for conservation.

Perućica forest reserve, located within the national park, was established in 1952, as a "Natural reserve for scientific and educational purposes". Perućica, which is one of the last two remaining primeval forests in Europe, is one of the five Strict Nature Reserves in Bosnia and Herzegovina.

The park is also famous as being the location of the Battle of the Sutjeska which lasted from 15 May to 16 June 1943 during World War II, where the Partisan were victorious over the German occupying forces in a battle. In the battle, the Partisans were led by the Supreme Headquarters of Yugoslavia by Marshal Josip Broz Tito who foiled the enemy’s plans. The Partisans were successful in breaking out of the encirclement even though they lost one third of their men. Several large Partisan’s Memorial stone monuments commemorate this event at the northern edge of the park at Tjentište, on the way to primeval Perucica forest reserve.

== Geography ==
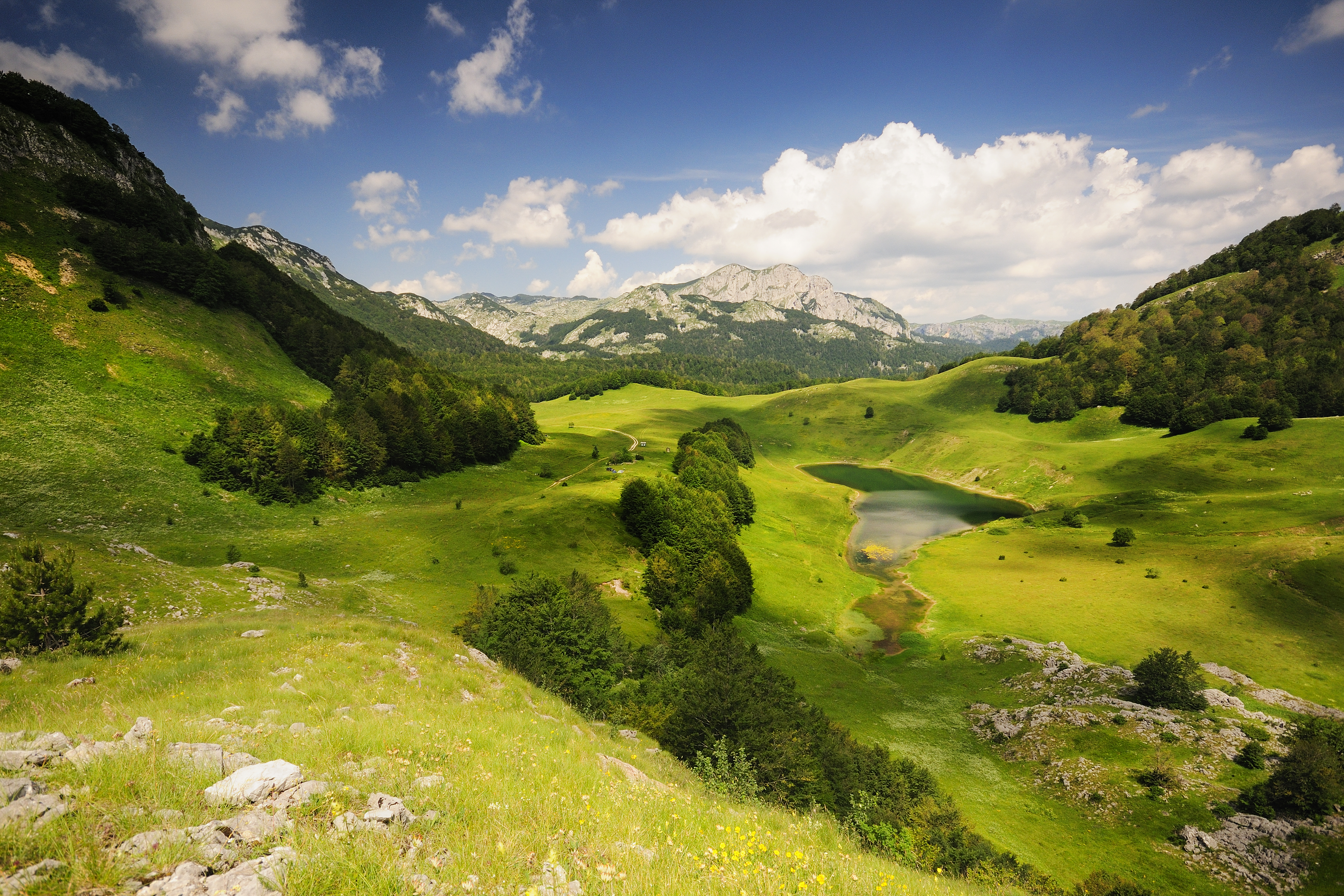
Orlovačko Lake

The park extends over an area of about 17,500 hectares (43,000 acres). It is bounded on the east by the Pivska planina Mountain (Cyrillic: Пивска планина) (1,775 metres (5,823 ft)) and Piva River up to Šćepan polje, and further along the Drina River course up to the confluence of Sutjeska River, on the west by Zelengora mountain (2,014 metres (6,608 ft)), connected with Lelija mountain (2,032 metres (6,667 ft)) and on the southeast by the Maglić mountain (2,386 metres (7,828 ft)), Volujak mountain (2,337 metres (7,667 ft)) and Bioč mountain (2,388 metres (7,835 ft)). An expansion plan to increase the park's boundary limits to cover an additional area of 8,331 hectares (20,590 acres), including an area of 3,500 hectares (8,600 acres) towards the Tara River canyon, is under consideration. With this expansion, the Sutjeska National Park will become the largest protected area not only in the Republic of Srpska but also in the whole country. Sutjeska National Park and the adjoining Durmitor National Park in northwestern Montenegro demonstrate transboundary protected area co-operation in the former Yugoslavia.

The park is accessible throughout most of the year but with some restrictions during part of the winter. It is accessible by road from Sarajevo–110 kilometres (68 mi) and Dubrovnik, Croatia–142 kilometres (88 mi). The connecting highway is Belgrade-Visegrad-Herceg Novi. Trebinje-Foca road passes along the canyon walls through thick forests leading to the park. The valley opens at the northern edge of the park. Foča city, near the border with Montenegro, is 20 kilometres (12 mi) away from the park and the nearest town is Mratinje. Bosnia and Herzegovina's highest peak, Maglić Mountain, directly on the border with Montenegro, presents a challenging climb for even experienced hikers. Zelengora mountain is popular with hikers and there are several newly renovated mountain huts on the mountain slopes. Tara River is noted for white water rafting.

=== Perućica ===
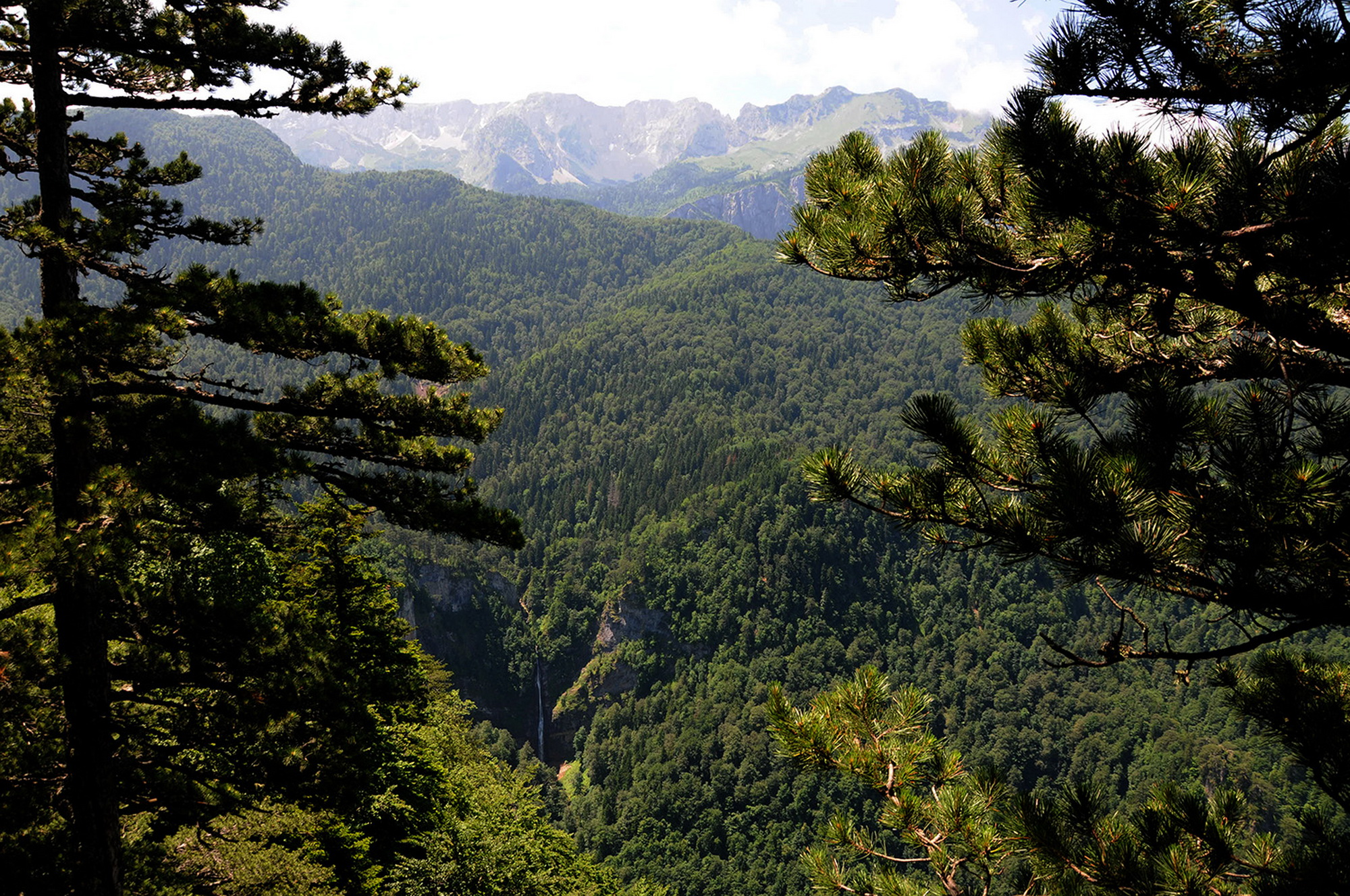
Perućica Forest Reserve

Perućica Forest Reserve, located within the park, is 6 kilometres (3.7 mi) long, 1–3 kilometres (0.62–1.86 mi) wide, and has an area of 1,400 hectares (3,500 acres). It is a UNESCO recognized site. The forest has many trees that are 300 years old, and the primeval forest's vintage is stated to be 20,000 years. In some stretches the forest growth is almost impenetrable.

=== Skakavac waterfall ===
Skakavac waterfall is formed on the Perućica, a small river, or more precisely mountain creek, located deep within Perućica primeval forest, which is regulated in form of Strict Nature Reserve as part of the Sutjeska National Park in Bosnia and Herzegovina. It is one of the highest waterfalls in the country, about 75 metres (246 ft) plus in height, and it is hidden deep within Perućica primeval forest and its massive blanket of green trees of beech and spruce that engulf entire valley.

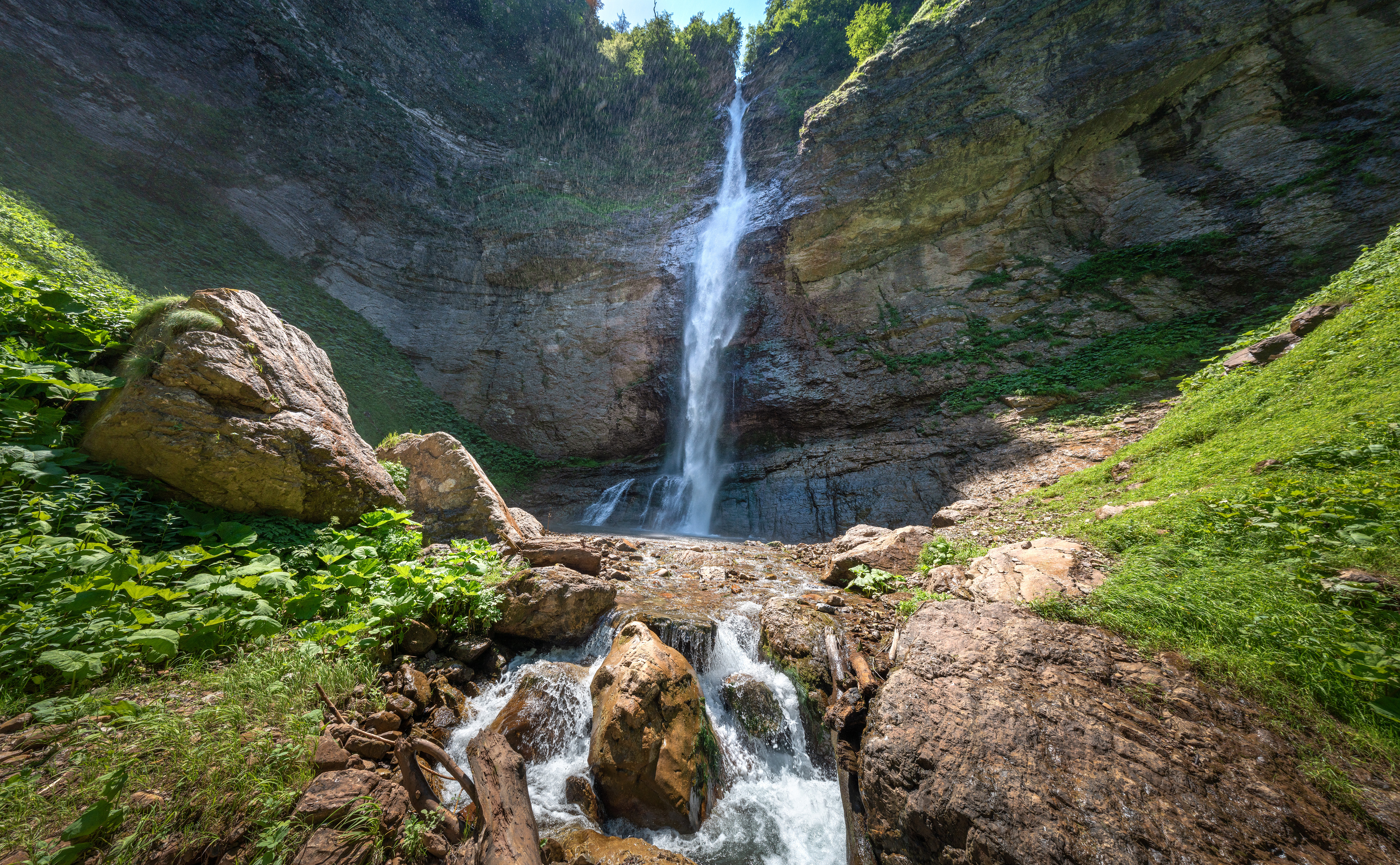
Skakavac Waterfall

Perućica primeval forest is situated underneath the highest peak in Bosnia and Herzegovina, Maglić (2386 m) and separated from the Zelengora mountain by the Sutjeska river and it's deep and rugged canyon.

The Perućica creek cut through the Perućica forest, and down and between two steep Maglić slopes. Somewhere in the middle of its course stream cascade from the upper hanging valley to the lower valley, falling across a large karstic limestone ridge to a precipice 75 meters deep, after which the Perućica creek reaches the confluence with the Sutjeska river at the valley of Tjentište.

=== Rivers and lakes ===
==== Rivers ====
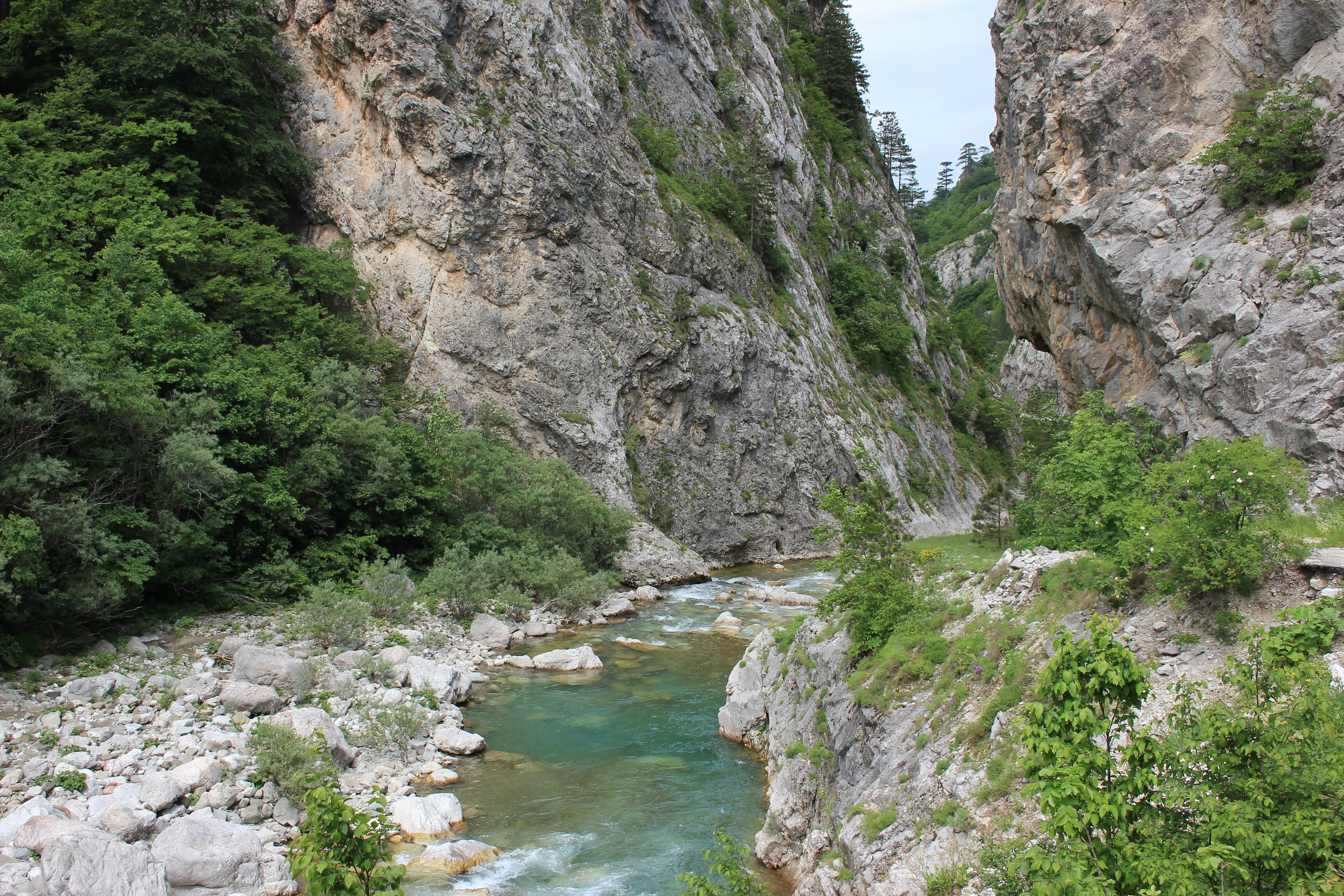
Sutjeska River

The Piva and Drina rivers are the largest rivers in the park, and they form its north-western border. The Sutjeska River could be considered the main river basin largely located within the park itself. The Sutjeska divides Zelengora Mountain from Maglić, Volujak and Bioč mountains, and has carved an impressive canyon 3,936 feet (1,200 m) deep, and Tjentište valley through the middle of the park. Other rivers are all tributaries of the Sutjeska. Left tributaries are Klobučarica Creek, Jabučnica Creek, and Hrčavka River. Right tributaries are Suški Creek (also called Suha River or Creek Sušica), Prijevor Creek, and Perućica Creek.

==== Lakes ====
The Zelengora mountain hide in its forests and wide and grassy plateaus, 9 glacial lakes, also known as "Gorske oči" (literally translated in Eng.= "Eyes of the Mountain"). These lakes are: Crno Lake, Bijelo Lake, Orlovačko Lake, Gornje Bare Lake, Donje Bare Lake, Štirinsko Lake, Kotlaničko Lake, Kladopoljsko Lake, and Jugovo Lake (also called Borilovačko Lake).

=== Climate ===
The park's climatic condition is a transitory zone. Moderate continental climate dominates from the north while the influence of a southern Mediterranean climate is less pronounced. The typical mountain climate is also largely moderated by the Adriatic Sea.

== Flora ==
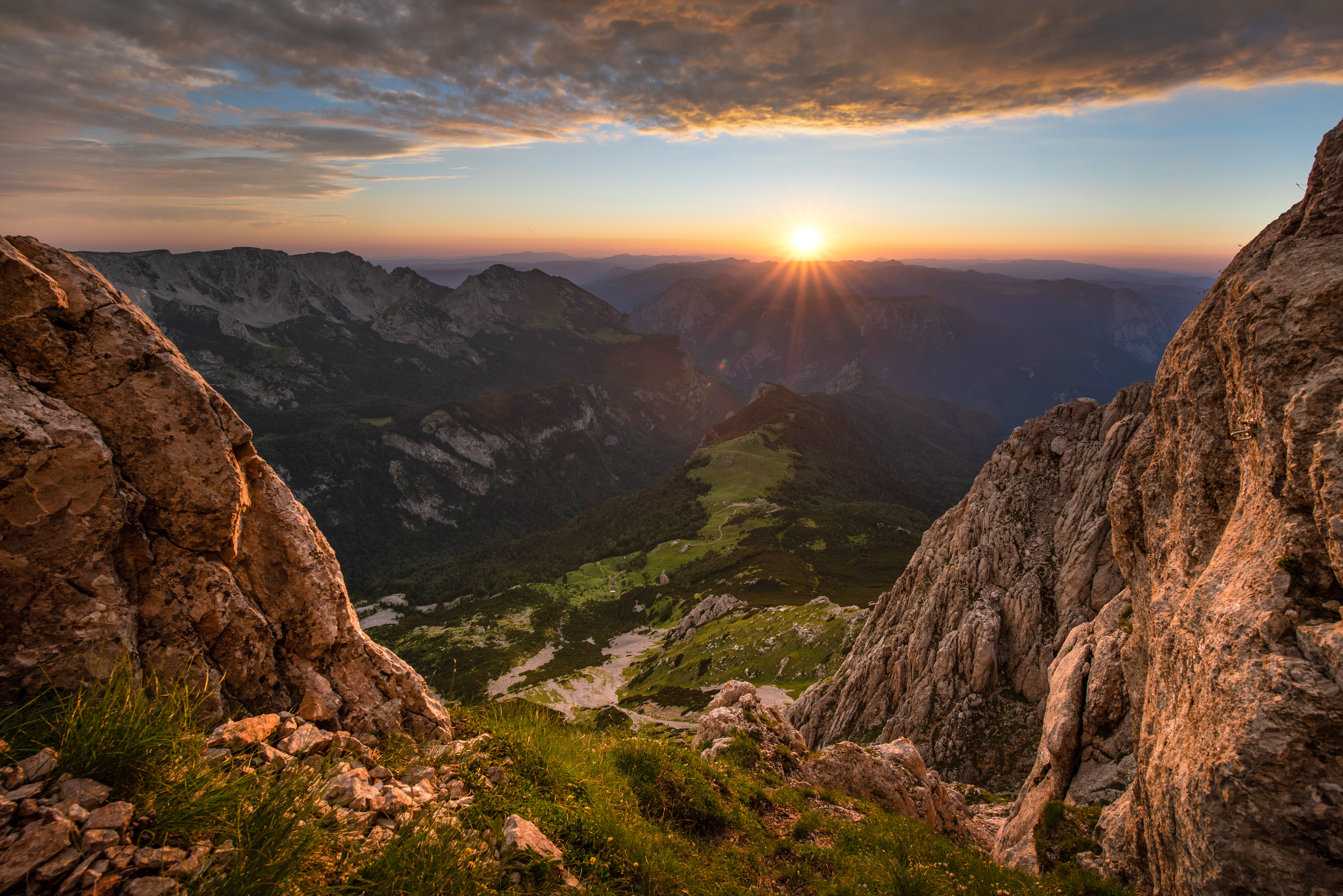
Maglić

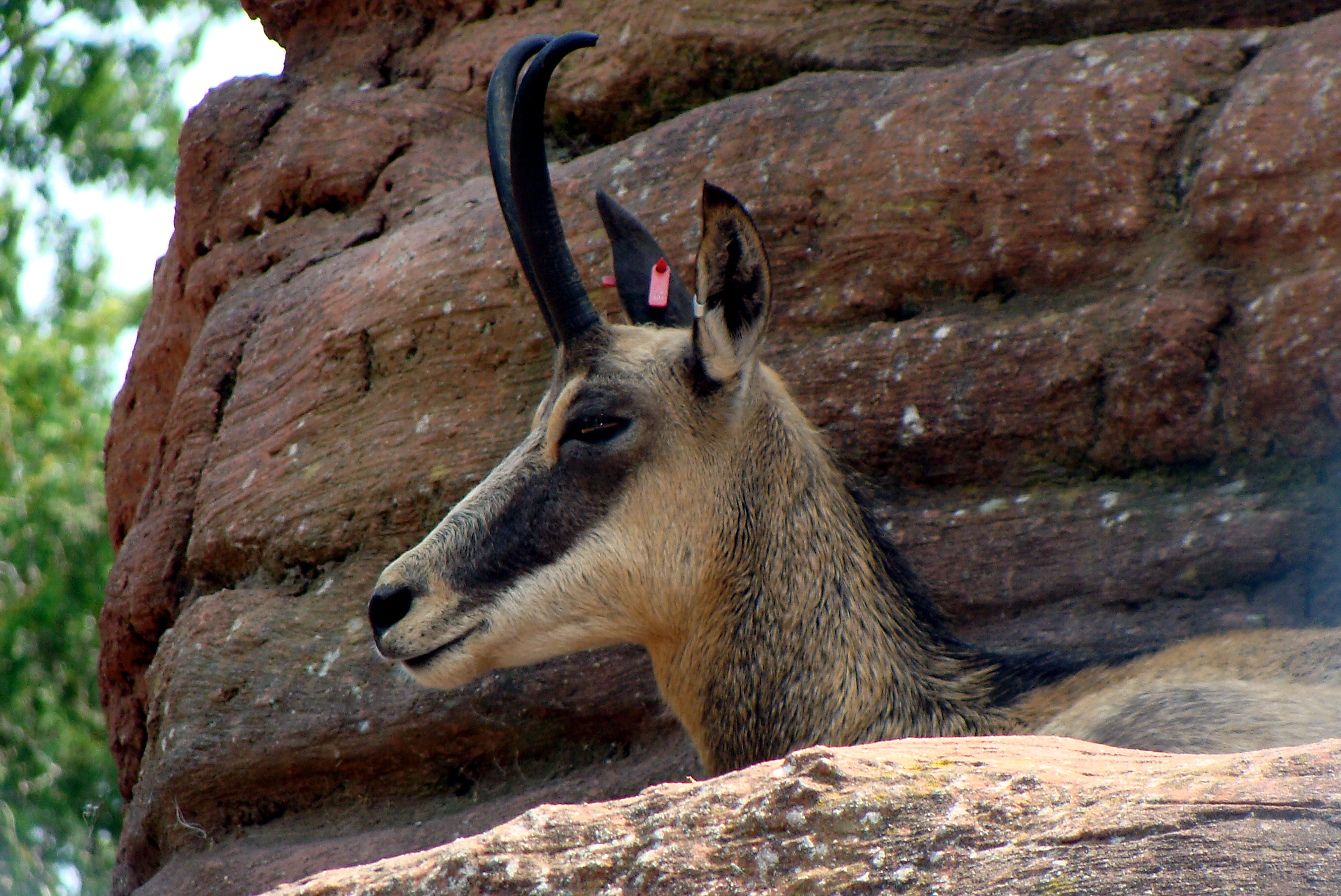
Balkan chamois (Rupicapra rupicapra balcanica), a goat–antelope species found in Europe and Carpathian Mountains

The park's vegetation comprises thick forests (66%) mountain pastures, meadows and rocky ground above the forests. In particular, the northwestern hill slopes have thick coniferous and beech trees up to an elevation of 1,600 metres (5,200 ft), while in the other directions, the hill slopes are very steep, barren and rocky. Pastures are found at elevations above 1,600 metres (5,200 ft) in the plateaus. Its floral wealth comprises 2,600 species of vascular plants (many of them rare and endemic) and also about 100 species of edible fungi. Perućica forest consists of large beech trees as high as 60 metres (200 ft) or more, with girth of about 150 centimetres (59 in), and endemic black pines which stem from the rocky faces that provides protection to the ancient forest in the entire valley. The trees in the Perućica primeval forest have never been logged and some of them are as old as 300 years.

== Fauna ==
The animal population is diverse and considerable. Bear, chamois, boar, wolf, pine marten and mink marten, wildcat, fox, and wild goats have been sighted in the park, particularly in the Perućica forests. The park has more than 300 species of birds in the large areas of lakes (nine lakes on the Zelengora mountain range in the park) and wetlands. Balkan chamois (Rupicapra rupicapra balcanica), a goat–antelope species (native to Europe and the Carpathian Mountains) management has been done with species available from the park. During 1963–1987, 256 chamois were successfully introduced in 13 other areas in Bosnia and Herzegovina, Croatia . Some of the bird species reported from the Perućica forests are: golden eagle, grouse, peregrine falcon, blackbird and rock partridge.

== Conservation and protection ==
Sutjeska National Park is an affiliated member of the EUROPARC Federation. Considering the overexploitation of natural resources (including illegal extraction of firewood), the World Bank has supported a major multipurpose management plan for biodiversity conservation, forestry management, cultural heritage conservation, tourism, and socioeconomic development. The projects cover physical improvement of existing Protected Areas, and the establishment of critical new priority areas with funding of US$2.76 million (including US$1.4 million from the Global Environment Facility). The project started in 2006, includes the existing Sutjeska National Park and also the Kozara National Park with a focus on plans of ecosystem development, participatory land-use planning, creation of new infrastructure, and limited small-scale rehabilitation of buildings, considered essential for improving the operation of the existing park. Infrastructural development includes trail improvements and new trail creation, signage repair, resting places, and demarcation of park boundaries. An exclusive training program is also part of the project scope. Since the 1960s, infrastructural development has posed a major difficulty so as to minimize impact upon the environment.

=== Future transboundary protection ===
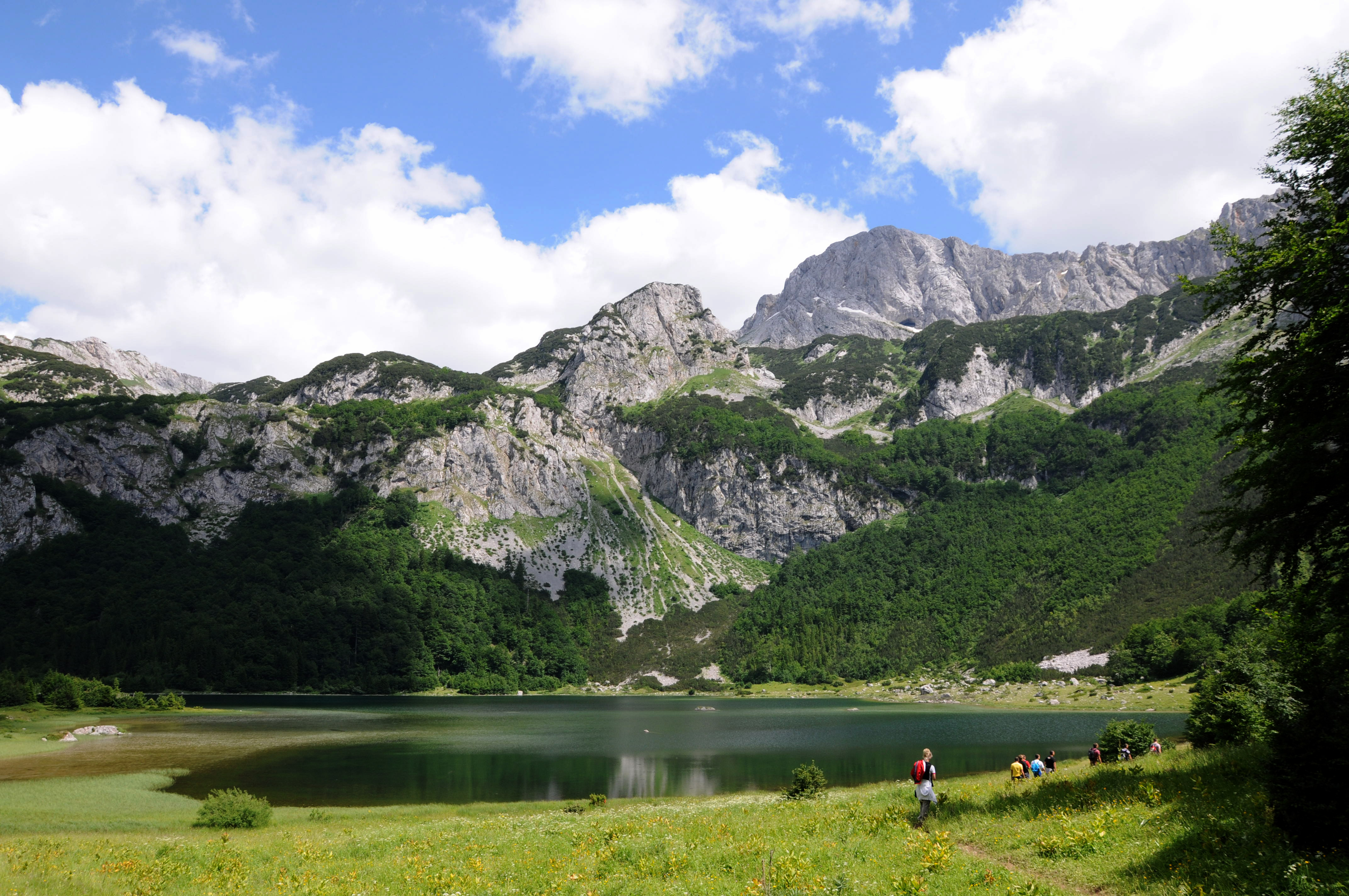
Trnovačko Lake

Trnovačko Lake, just outside the park and the borders of Bosnia and Herzegovina, is a glacial lake at an elevation of 1,500 metres (4,900 ft), is 700 metres (2,300 ft) long and 400 metres (1,300 ft) wide set amidst a "huge amphitheater of rocky peaks". The lake is drained from the Maglic, the Volujak, and the Bioc hill ranges. The north side of the lake, which is open, has the wooded Vratnice. The lake water is green-blue. The plan is to form another national park within the borders of Montenegro, which should protect the rest of the mountain range of Magilć-Volujak-Bioč and Trnovačko Lake. These two parks in neighboring countries should form one large transboundary protected zone.

== See also ==
- Sutjeska (river)
- Perućica
- Skakavac Waterfall, Perućica
- List of national parks of Bosnia and Herzegovina
- Tara (Drina)
- Piva (river)
- Drina
- Neretva
