= Orlovačko Lake =

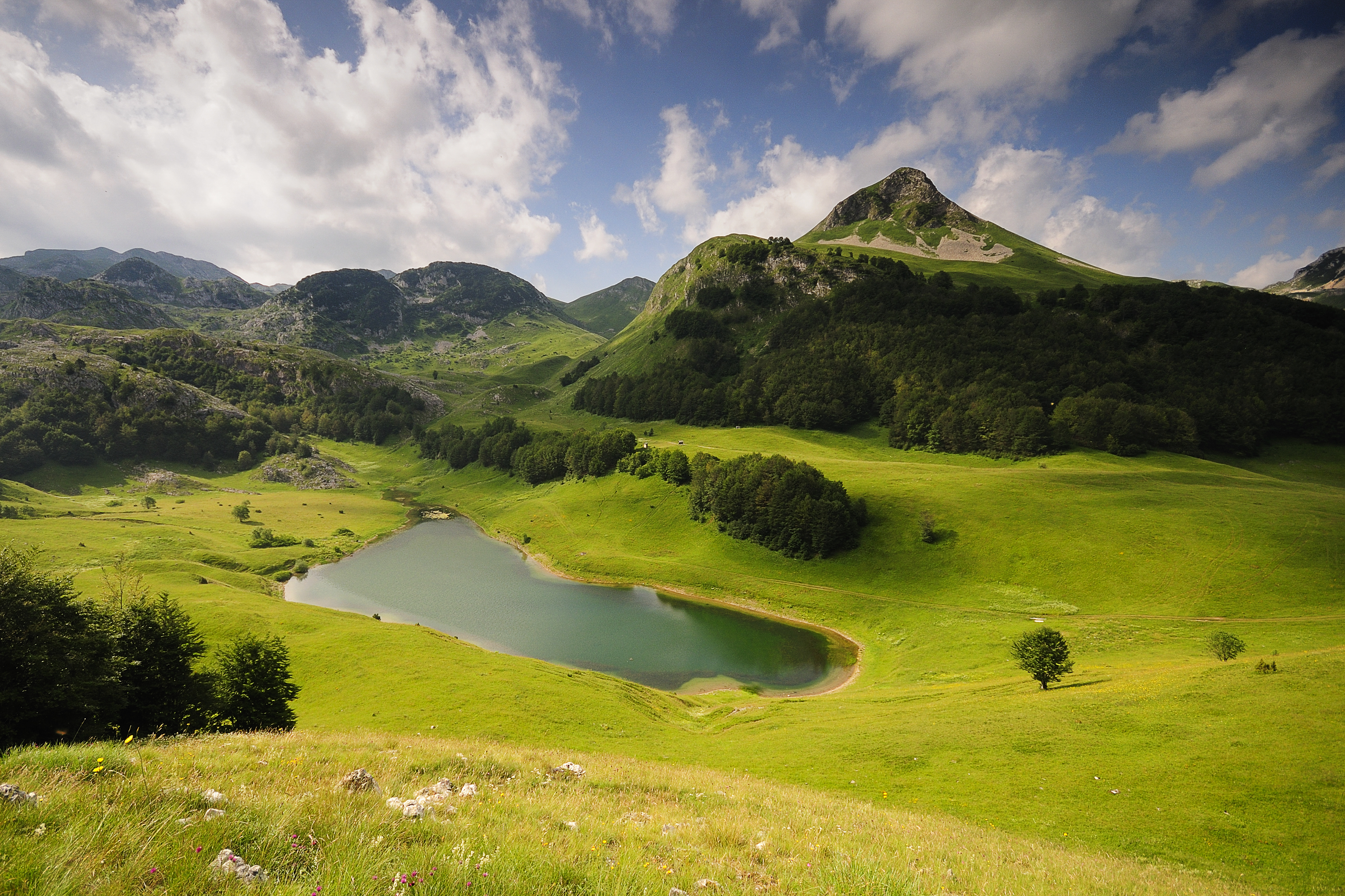

- Location within Bosnia and Herzegovina
- Interactive map of Orlovačko Lake
- Location: Republika Srpska, Bosnia and Herzegovina
- Coordinates: 43°22′39″N 18°32′57″E
- Type: Lake
- Surface area: 3.50 ha (8.6 acres)
- Max. depth: 5.50 m (18.0 ft)

Orlovačko Lake (Serbo-Croatian: Orlovačko jezero, Орловачко језеро) is a lake in Bosnia and Herzegovina. It is located in the municipality of Kalinovik. The lake area is about 3.50 hectares (8.6 acres), and has a maximum depth of about 5.50 metres (18.0 ft).

== See also ==
- List of lakes in Bosnia and Herzegovina
