= Sutjeska (river) =

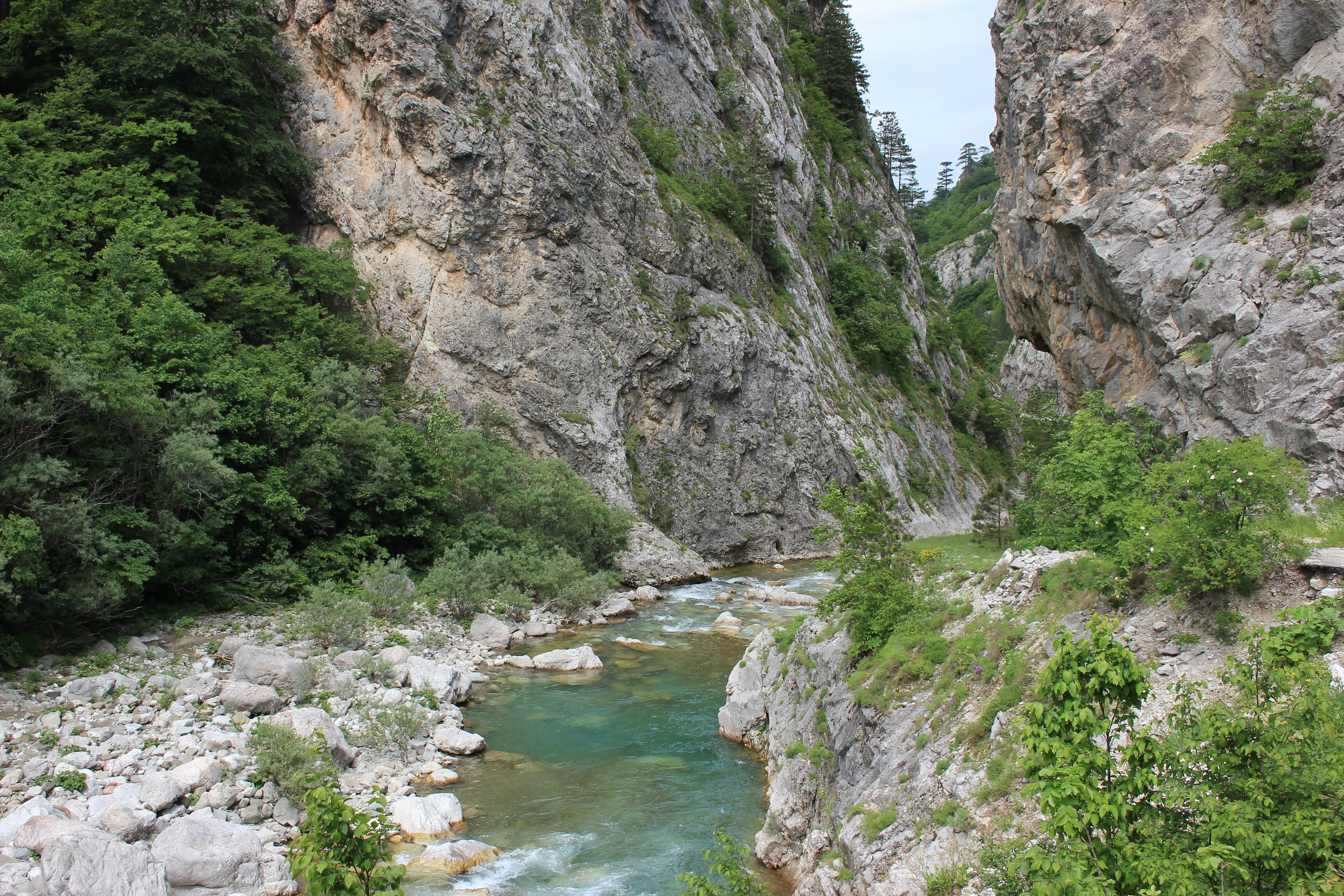
- Sutjeska River - before entering Sutjeska River canyon

- Location within Bosnia and Herzegovina

Location
- Country: Bosnia and Herzegovina

Physical characteristics
- Mouth
  - location: Drina
  - coordinates: 43.3736°N 18.7944°E

Basin features
- Progression: Drina→ Sava→ Danube→ Black Sea

The Sutjeska (Serbian Cyrillic: Сутјеска, pronounced [sûtjɛska]; lit. "gorge or canyon") is a 35 km-long river in eastern Bosnia and Herzegovina. It is a tributary of the Drina river, which it meets south of Foča.

== Geography ==
The Sutjeska River could be considered the main river basin largely located within Sutjeska National Park itself. The Sutjeska divides Zelengora Mountain from Maglić, Volujak and Bioč mountains, and has carved an impressive canyon 3,936 feet (1,200 m) deep, and Tjentište valley through the middle of the park.

== Tributaries ==
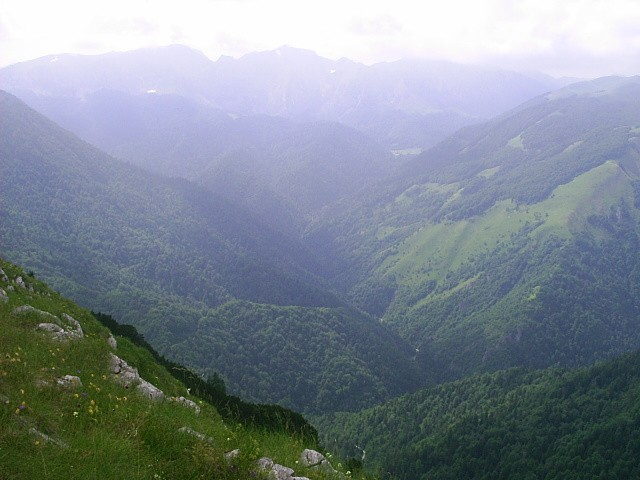
Hrčavka River valley, tributary of the Sutjeska within Sutjeska National Park

Tributaries of the Sutjeska are:

- left tributaries are Klobučarica Creek, Jabučnica Creek, and Hrčavka River;
- right tributaries are Suški Creek (also called Suha River or Creek Sušica), Prijevor Creek and Perućica Creek.

== Ecology and ichthyofauna ==
Running mostly through the national park which mandates high level of protection, the river Sutjeska is rich in salmonides, mostly brown trout, and offers terrains for fly fishing. In its lower course the river is also important spawning ground for huchen which enter the river during spawning season from the Drina river.

== Historical significance ==
It is famous for having been the site of the World War II Battle of the Sutjeska.

== See also ==
- List of rivers of Bosnia and Herzegovina
- List of national parks of Bosnia and Herzegovina
- Skakavac Waterfall, Perućica
- Perućica
- Tara (Drina)
- Piva (river)
- Neretva

== Bibliography ==
=== Biology ===
- Šašić, Martina; Nahirnić, Ana; Tarmann, Gerhard M. (2016-12-31). "Zygaenidae (Lepidoptera) in the Lepidoptera collections of the Croatian Natural History Museum". Natura Croatica: Periodicum Musei Historiae Naturalis Croatici. 25 (2): 233–248. doi:10.20302/NC.2016.25.19. eISSN 1848-7386.
