= Bioč =

Mountain in Montenegro

Coordinates: 43°13′44″N 18°45′20″E

Highest point
- Elevation: 2,397 m (7,864 ft)

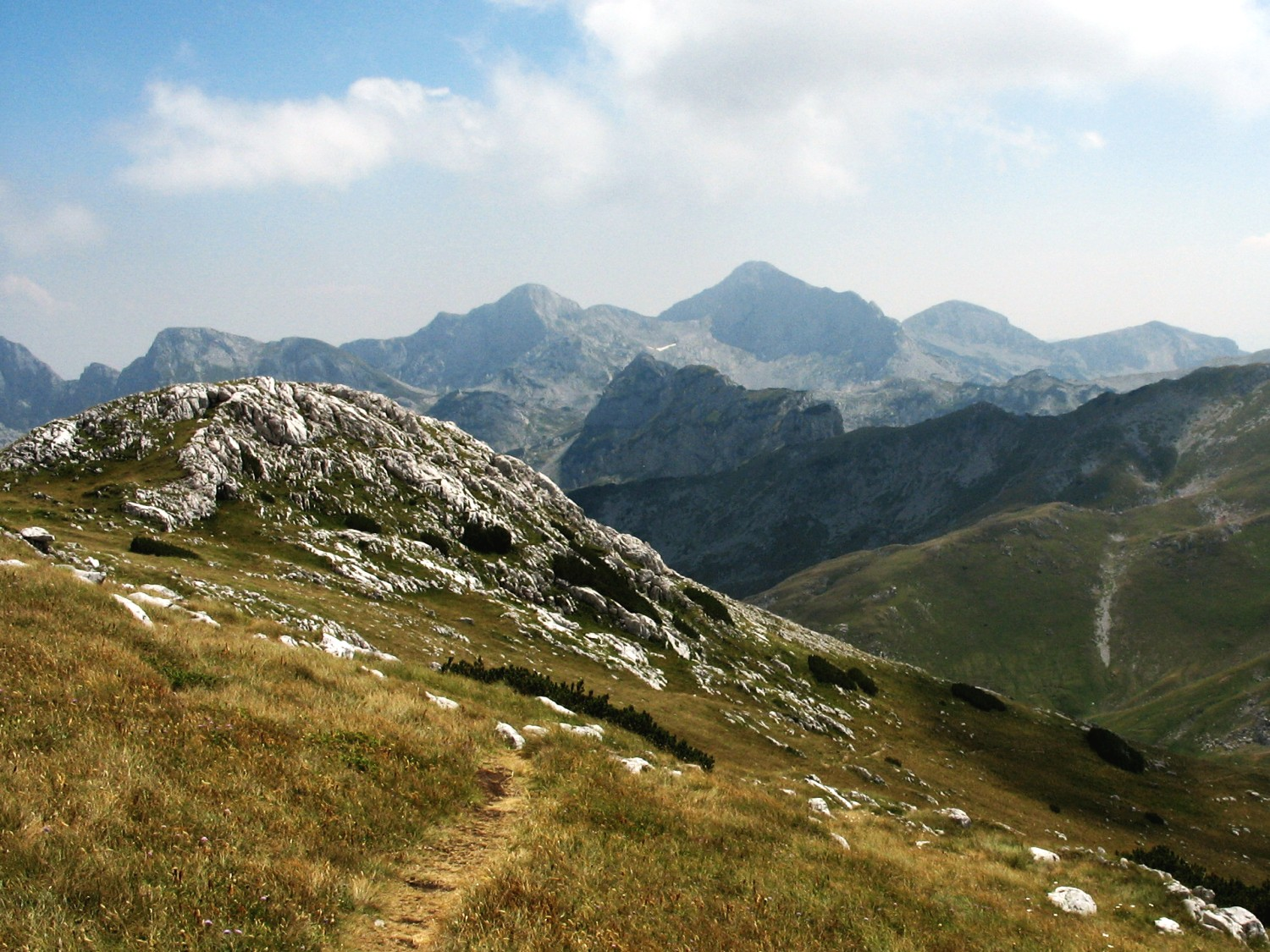
Bioć Mts. in Montenegro, in the middle is the highest peak Veliki Vitao (2396 m)

Bioč (Serbian Cyrillic: Биоч) is a mountain within the Piva Regional Park in Montenegro, and in part within the Sutjeska National Park in Bosnia and Herzegovina. The highest peak is Veliki Vitao (also called Vitlovi) with an altitude of 2,397 metres (7,864 ft). The mountain is bounded by the rivers Sutjeska in Bosnia, and Vrbnica and Piva in Montenegro.
