= EUROPARC Federation =

The EUROPARC Federation, formally known as the Federation of Nature and National Parks of Europe, is an independent, non-governmental organisation which aims to work with national parks across Europe in enhancing protection. Founded in 1973 in Basel, it moved its headquarters to Grafenau, Bavaria in 1986 and again to Regensburg in 2010. As of 2013 it represents some 365 parks in 36 countries.
