= Mratinje =

Mratinje Мратиње
- Village
- Location within Montenegro
- Coordinates: 43.259574°N 18.816145°E
- Country: Montenegro
- Municipality: Plužine

Population (2011)
  - Total: 122
- Time zone: UTC+1 (CET)
  - Summer (DST): UTC+2 (CEST)

Mratinje (Montenegrin: Мратиње) is a village in the municipality of Plužine, Montenegro.

== Demographics ==
According to the 2011 census, its population was 122.

Ethnicity in 2011
Ethnicity	Number	Percentage
Serbs	76	62.3%
Montenegrins	38	31.1%
other/undeclared	8	6.6%
Total	122	100%
