= Perućica =

Primeval forest in Bosnia and Herzegovina

- IUCN category Ia (strict nature reserve)
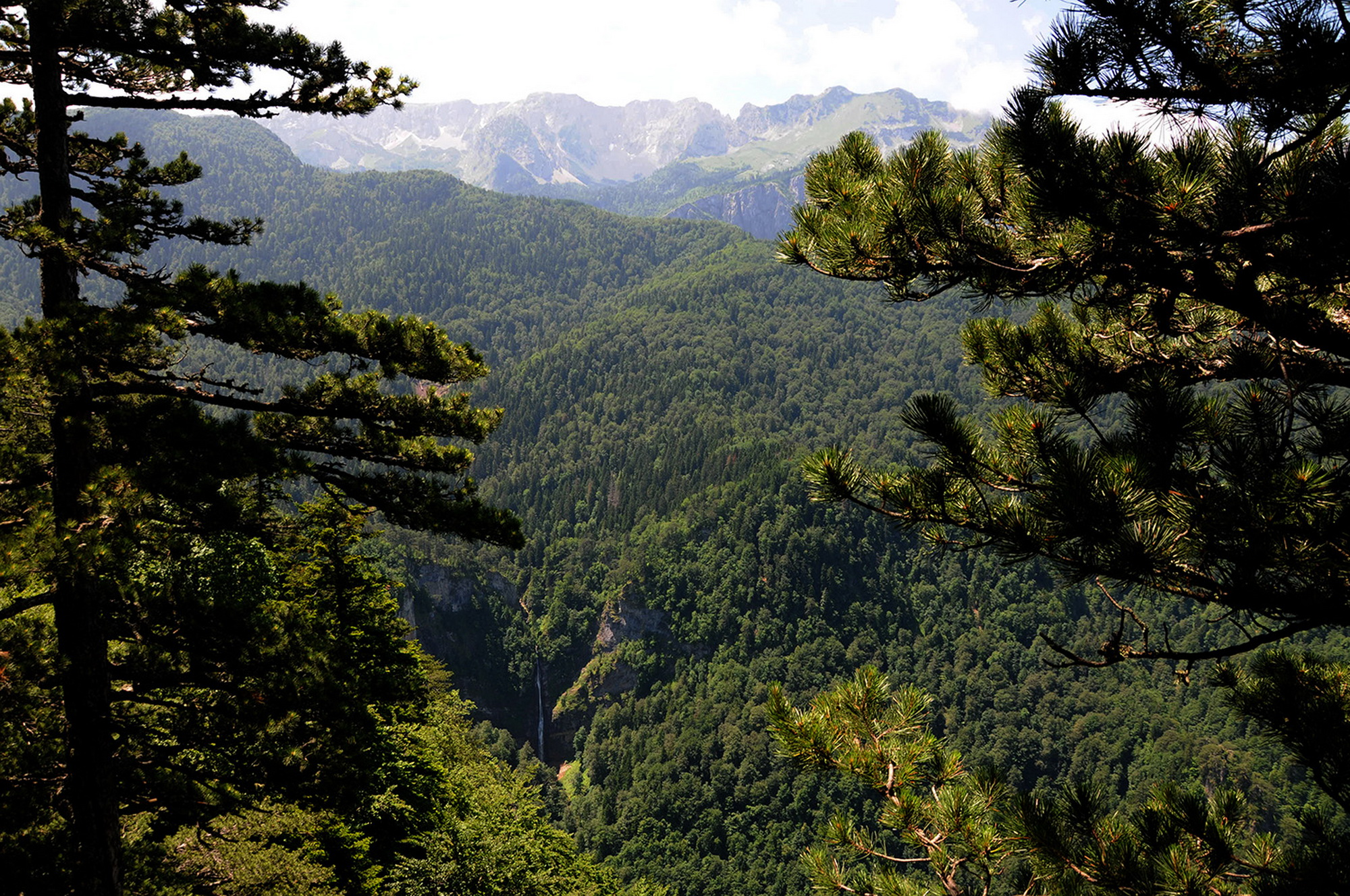
- Perućica Forest Reserve

- Location within Bosnia and Herzegovina
- Interactive map of Perućica
- Location: Republika Srpska, Bosnia and Herzegovina
- Coordinates: 43°18′50″N 18°41′48″E
- Area: 14 km^{2} (5.4 sq mi)
- Established: 1962
- Visitors: Open all year (in Open all year)

Perućica (Serbian Cyrillic: Перућица) is one of the last remaining primeval forests in Europe. It is located in Bosnia and Herzegovina, near the border with Montenegro. It is part of the Sutjeska National Park.

The Perućica Forest Reserve is 6 kilometres (3.7 mi) long, 1–3 kilometres (0.62–1.86 mi) wide, and has an area of 1,400 hectares (3,500 acres). It is a UNESCO recognized site. The forest has many trees that are 300 years old, and the primeval forest's vintage is stated to be 20,000 years. In some stretches the forest growth is almost impenetrable, and the forest can only be explored in the company of rangers.

The forest is known for its towering beech and spruce trees, as well as its exceptional biodiversity and untouched natural environment. One of its most striking features is the Skakavac Waterfall, which plunges approximately 75 meters into the forest valley. The waterfall is nestled beneath the towering Maglić peak, the highest mountain in Bosnia and Herzegovina at 2,386 meters. Perućica offers a rare glimpse into what Europe's forests looked like before large-scale human intervention.

== See also ==
- Skakavac Waterfall, Perućica
- Sutjeska (river)
- Sutjeska National Park
- List of national parks of Bosnia and Herzegovina
- Tara (Drina)
- Piva (river)
- Drina
- Neretva
