= Land mines in Bosnia and Herzegovina =

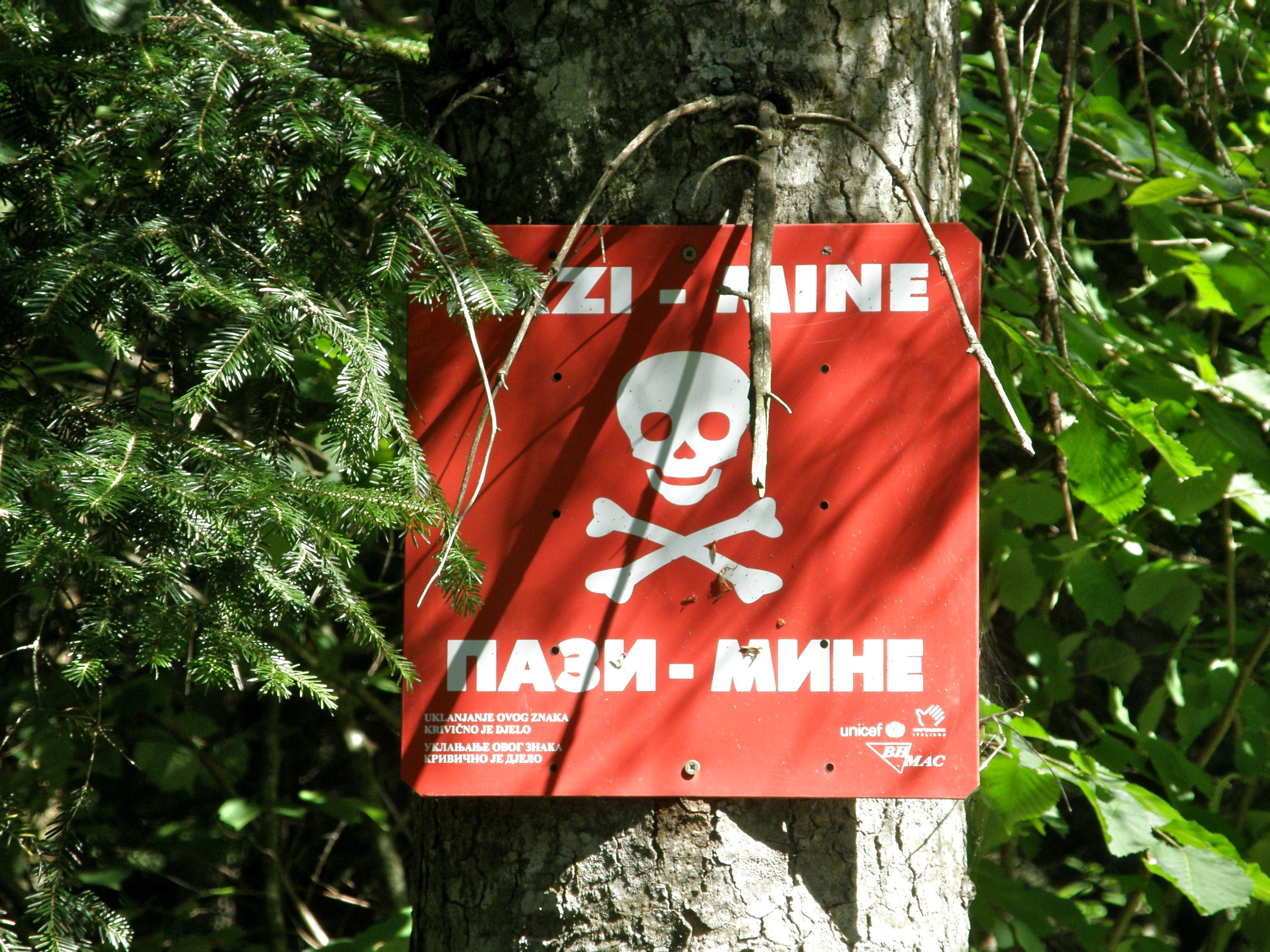
Landmine warning sign in Bosnia and Herzegovina

Land mine contamination in Bosnia and Herzegovina is a serious after effect of the Bosnian War, which took place from 1992 until 1995. During this time period, all 3 conflicting factions (ARBiH, HVO, and VRS) planted land mines near the current-day political entity borders. As a result, the country has had one of the most severe land mine problems in the world. Although landmine removal efforts have made progress throughout the country and the landmine-related deaths have steadily decreased each year, many people are still killed or suffer injuries caused by unexploded munitions in Bosnia and Herzegovina. For local communities, contamination is a barrier to socio-economic development and access to livelihoods. This is important as Bosnia and Herzegovina remains economically fragile and one of the poorest countries in Europe. Over 60 percent of the population lives in rural areas and are dependent on access to land for agriculture, livestock grazing, hunting, and gathering wood and herbs. Despite the threat of landmines, people enter contaminated areas out of economic necessity.

== Land mine situation ==
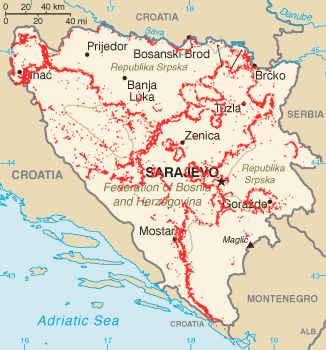
Landmine situation in BiH in September 2008. Red repressents areas suspected of containing landmines and unexploded ordnance.

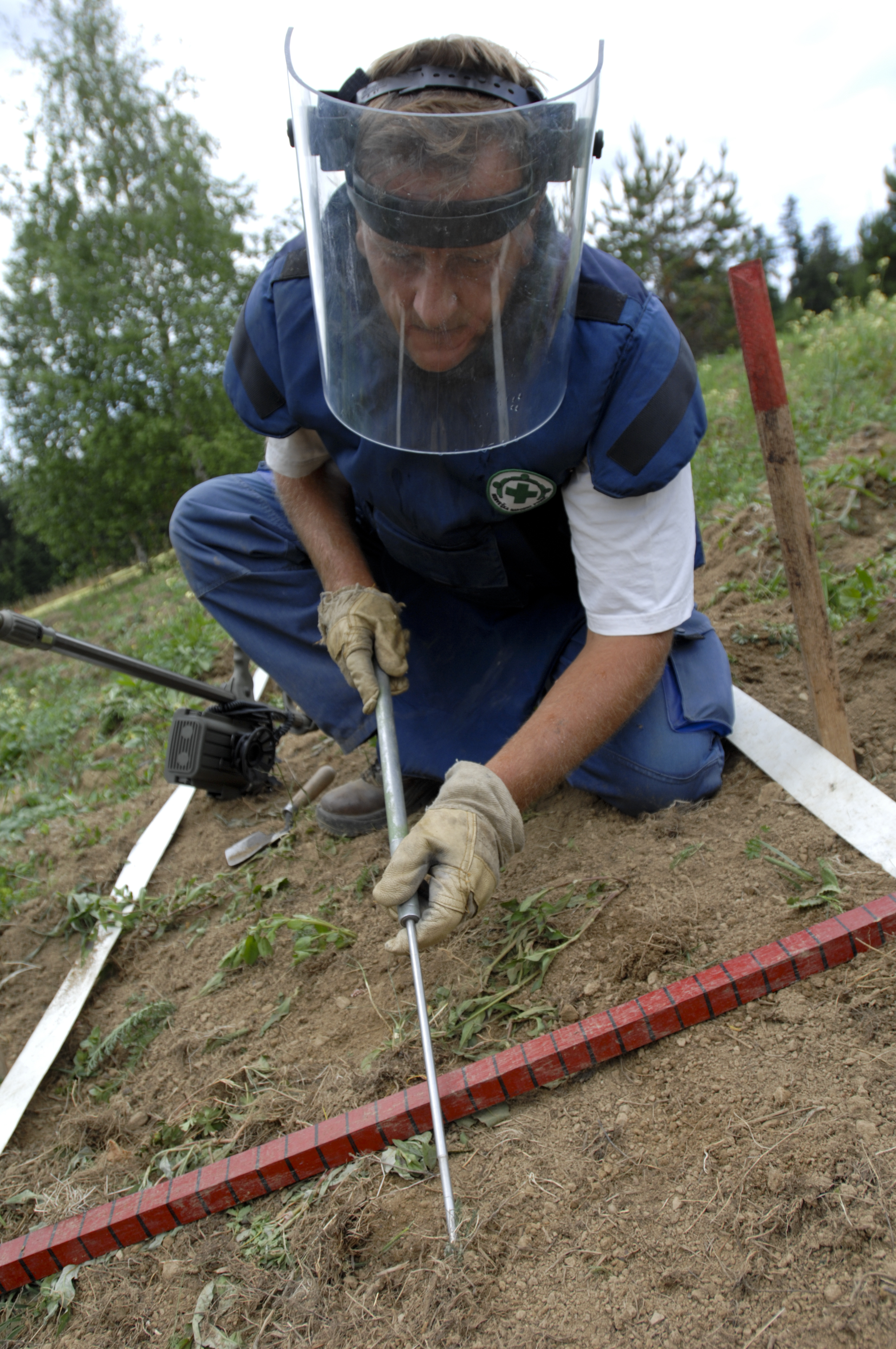
A Norwegian deminer at work in Bosnia in 2007

Bosnia and Herzegovina's land mine contamination stems exclusively from the 1992–95 war in the country. Throughout the war, landmines were used by all three warring factions (ARBiH, HVO and VRS) and the location of the landmines is where the military confrontations lines were during the war period. The majority of landmines which were used by the three sides were the PROM-1, a Yugoslav manufactured anti-personnel mine which has since been banned by the Ottawa Treaty. Many landmines today also follow the IEBL dividing the two entities, which are the Federation of Bosnia and Herzegovina and Republika Srpska. By 1996, some two million land mines and unexploded munitions littered Bosnia.

In September 2013, land mines and unexploded munitions remained scattered in 28,699 locations. A total of 1,230.70 km^{2} (2.4% of the country's territory) was mined. The next year, in May 2014, extensive landslides and the worst flooding since the 19th century unearthed landmines, prompting authorities to send in de-mining workers to locate and deactivate mines that were threatening residential areas which had already been deemed cleared.

Land mine clearing is done by various government agencies and NGOs as well as some NATO military units. Between 1996 and 2017, more than 3,000 square kilometres have been cleared of mines. Bosnia and Herzegovina's strategic vision in 2008 was to clear all land mines by the year 2019. In April 2017, experts thought it would take at least five years longer, citing a lack of funds as the primary hurdle. 80,000 mines were estimated to be yet uncleared, located across 2.2% (1,125 km^{2}) of the Bosnian territory. In December 2017, the deadline was moved to 2025, but experts believe that this is an unreasonable goal based on the lack of financial resources. Some suggest that it could take several more decades. According to the Bosnia and Herzegovina Mine Action Centre, the landmine contamination problem impacts over 538,000 people in over 1,400 communities (around 15% of the population).

On 4 April, International Mine Awareness Day, the government, the UN and a number of other international and local NGOs inform citizens about the dangers of land mines and the efforts to clear them.

In April 2019 on International Mine Awareness Day, a project called Mine Free Sarajevo was launched which envisioned a Sarajevo free of mines. The project was fully funded by the United States, which provided over $1.6 million in funding, making it the largest contribution in a decade dedicated to landmine clearance in Bosnia. Four municipalities in the Sarajevo region were cleared of mines: Stari Grad, East Stari Grad, Vogošća, and Novi Grad, clearing 6 million square meters of previously inaccessible land and returning it to local communities. The project utilised land release methodology, a cost-effective and safe way to release large areas by combining technical and non-technical methods. During the demining process in these municipalities, MDDC teams (Mine Detection Dog Center in Bosnia and Herzegovina) found and destroyed 841 explosive devices, out of which there were 445 mines and 396 unexploded ordnances.

Mine Free Sarajevo officially closed on 1 September 2021 and the area is now completely mine-free and therefore significantly safer for locals and tourists. In addition, several crucial economic opportunities, such as further development of important agricultural land and infrastructure projects can resume.

Minefields area km^{2} (sq mi) size in Bosnia and Herzegovina
Administrative level	2019	2020	2024
Una-Sana Canton	96.26 (37.17)	95.08 (36.71)	87.32 (33.71)
Posavina	15.53 (6.00)	14.98 (5.78)	14.34 (5.53)
Tuzla	80.16 (30.95)	80.69 (31.15)	69.93 (27.0)
Zenica-Doboj	112.69 (43.51)	114.67 (44.27)	108.91 ( 42.05)
Bosnian-Podrinje	46.82 (18.08)	46.83 (18.08)	42.42 (16.37)
Central Bosnia	113.10 (43.67)	110.95 (42.84)	100.67 (38.86)
Herzegovina-Neretva	149.87 (57.87)	149.81 (57.84)	126.78 (48.95)
West Herzegovina	0.82 (0.32)	0.82 (0.32)	0.20 (0.07)
Sarajevo	58.04 (22.41)	58.06 (22.42)	48.56 (18.74)
Canton 10	79.27 (30.61)	78.96 (30.49)	61.83 (23.87)
Federation of BiH	752.56 (290.57)	750.86 (289.91)	660.98 (255.21)
Brčko District	13.11 (5.06)	12.99 (5.02)	9.45 (3.64)
Republika Srpska	199.59 (77.06)	192.51 (74.33)	167.86 (64.81)
Total	965.26 (372.69)	956.36 (369.25)	838.29 (323.67)

== Land mine casualties ==
From 1992 through 2008, 5,005 people were killed or injured by land mines or unexploded munitions. Wartime casualties stood at 3,339 killed and injured. Peacetime casualties, from 1996 through 2008 number 1,666 of which 486 persons were fatalities. From 1996 to 2017, more than 1,750 people were injured, at least 612 of them fatalities. According to the International Committee of the Red Cross, about 15% of all landmine victims are children.

Land mine casualties in Bosnia and Herzegovina 1996-2025
Year	Killed	Injured	Total
1996	110	552	662
1997	88	202	290
1998	60	80	140
1999	38	57	95
2000	35	65	100
2001	32	55	87
2002	26	46	72
2003	23	31	54
2004	16	27	43
2005	10	9	19
2006	18	17	35
2007	8	22	30
2008	34	30	64
2009	9	19	28
2010	6	8	14
2011	9	14	23
2012	9	3	12
2013	3	10	13
2014	6	11	17
2015	1	0	1
2016	6	6	12
2017	3	4	7
2018	1	3	4
2019	2	3	5
2020	0	0	0
2021	3	0	3
2022	1	0	1
2023	1	0	1
2024	0	0	0
2025	1	0	1
Totals	559	1,274	1,833
