= Zelengora =

Mountain range in Bosnia and Herzegovina

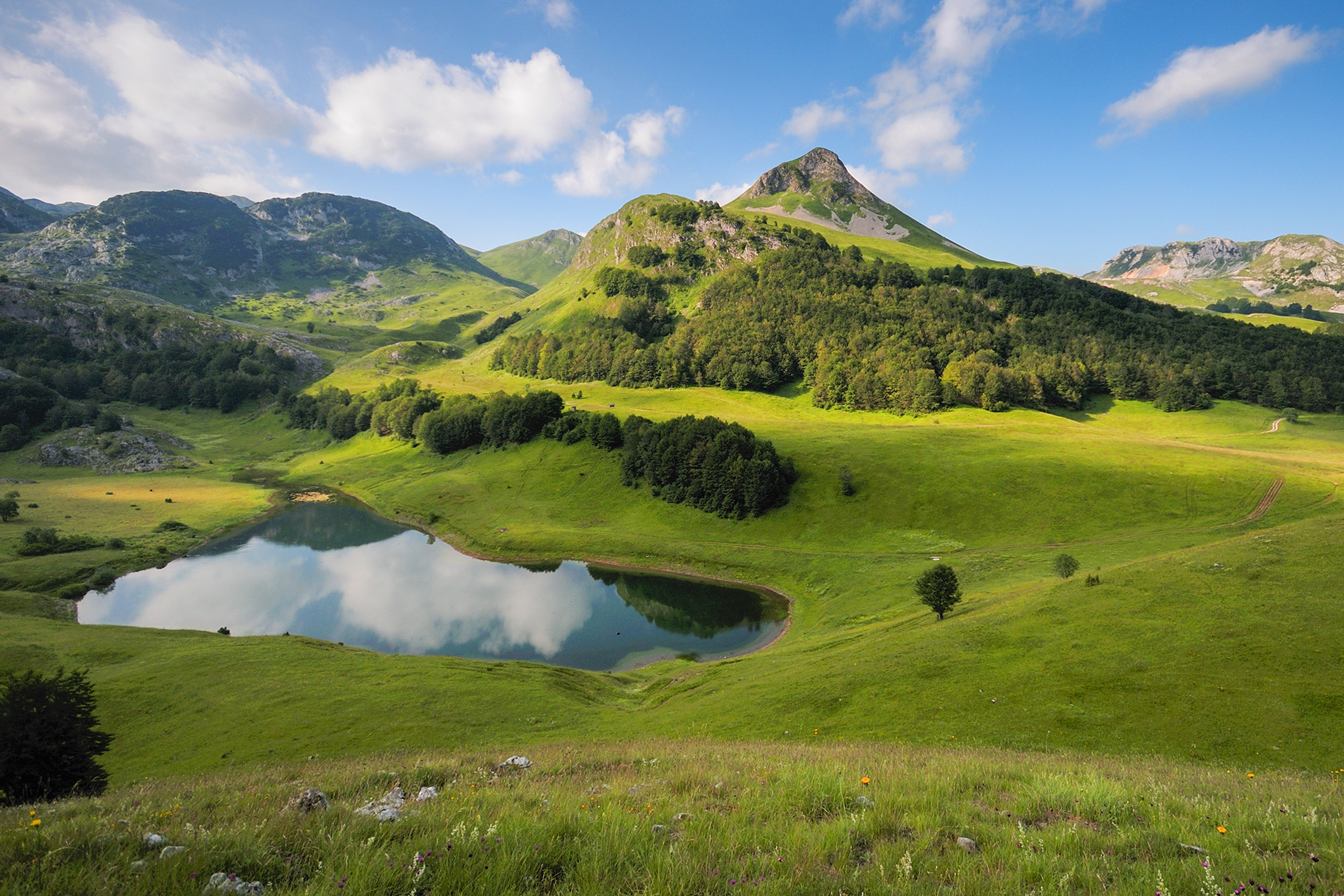

Highest point
- Elevation: 2,014 m (6,608 ft)
- Coordinates: 43°21′17″N 18°34′03″E

Geography
- Location within Bosnia and Herzegovina
- Location: Bosnia and Herzegovina
- Parent range: Dinaric Alps

Zelengora (Зеленгора) is a mountain range in the Sutjeska National Park of Bosnia and Herzegovina. It has a highest altitude of 2,014 metres (6,608 ft).

== Topography ==
Geologically, the Zelengora range is part of the Dinaric Alps and formed largely of secondary and tertiary sedimentary rock, mostly limestone. The Zelengora range is bordered to the south-west by the Neretva river, to the east by the Sutjeska river and to the north by the Lelija range. A number of mountain lakes are scattered throughout the group, among which the beautiful Orlovačko Jezero. The Neretva river sources from these mountains: as also the Hrčavka, tributary of the Sutjeska river and the Bjelava, tributary of the Drina river. Highest peak is Bregoč (2014 m.), other notable peaks are Kozje Strane (2013 m.), Dhrtar (1970 m.), Trebova Planina (1872 m.) and Orlovača (1969 m.).

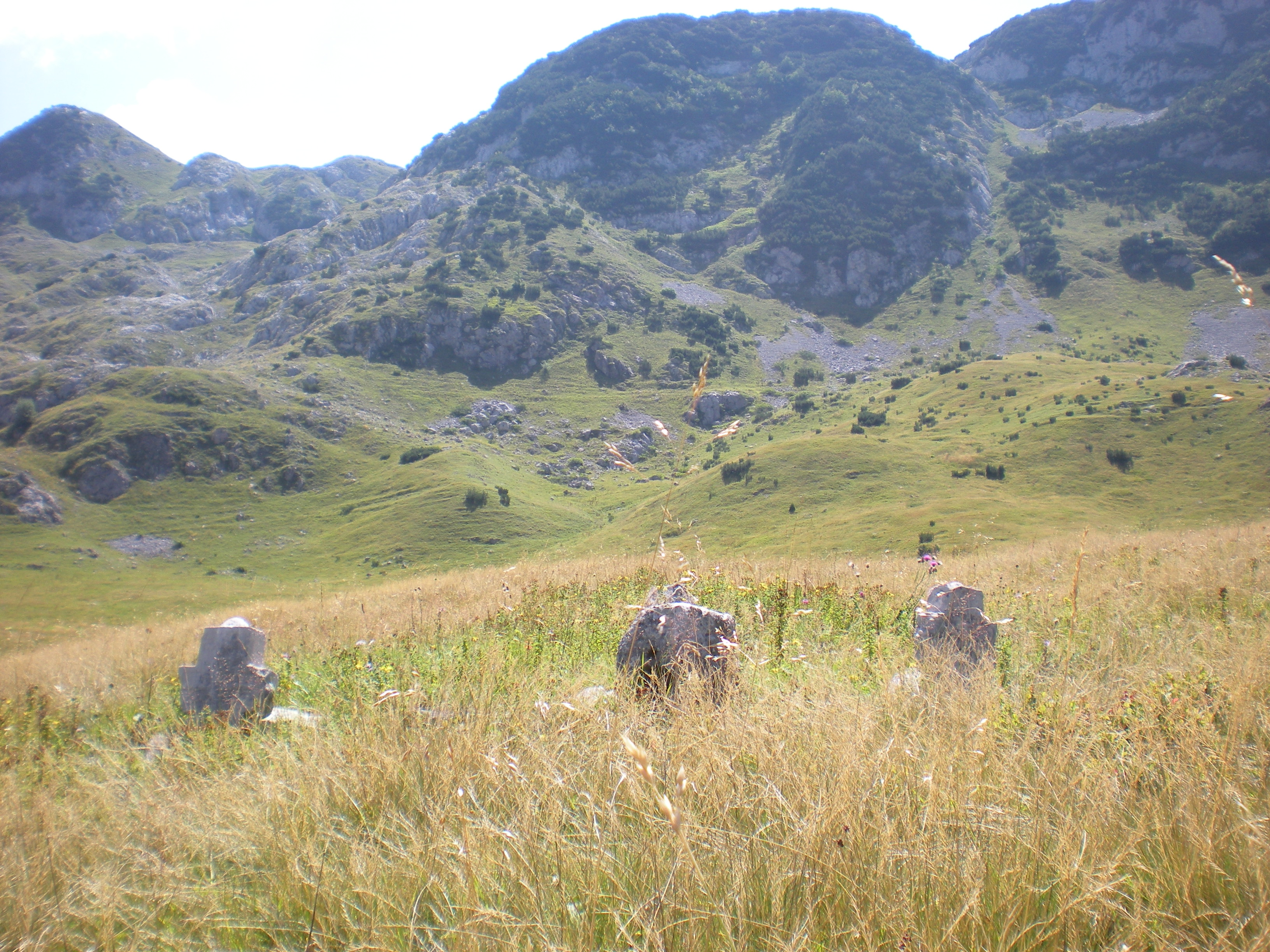
Zelengora

== Particulars ==
The mountains of Zelengora were not part of the frontline during the 1990-1995 conflict and therefore have virtually no contamination with land mines and unexploded ordnance. Earlier though, in 1943, Zelengora became the scene of fierce combat during the Second World War, especially in a decisive phase of the Battle of the Sutjeska. By means of Operation Schwarz, the German occupational forces tried to encircle and destroy the YNLA, the partisan forces of Marshal Josip Broz Tito who had taken positions around Durmitor mountain in present Montenegro. Tito planned to break out of the encirclement towards the north across the river Sutjeska. In a battle that started on 5 June 1943, Partisan units of the YNLA 2nd Dalmatian Brigade took up positions in order to enable an escape of the YNLA forces through Zelengora. They were engaged by the German 118th Jäger Division. In spite of exhaustion, illness and dwindling munition supplies, the partisans of the 2nd Dalmatian Brigade held out against the far superior German forces until they were strengthened by the 1st Majevica Brigade on 9 June and were enabled to retreat in order to join the YNLA on 10 June. By that time, the 2nd Brigade had lost two thirds of its numbers, but had been successful in stalling the German advance sufficiently to allow Tito's forces to cross the Sutjeska river and break out of the German encirclement.

Later, in May 1945, these mountains became the site of the last military standoff between the Yugoslav People's Army and the Četnik forces of Draža Mihailović in a battle that lasted from 8 until 13 May 1945.

Zelengora is now known as "a wilderness of outstanding beauty" The eroded peaks of Zelengora that emerge from large mixed forests, attract, also because of the remoteness of the area, relatively few hikers. The wildness of the nature and the complete lack of signs of modern civilization gives these mountains a special appeal. The area around Orlovačko Jezero -and elsewhere- though, bears visible traces of historical habitation. The protection as part of the Sutjeska National Park of a large area of these mountains safeguards the integrity of the wilderness. A marked trail leading to the highest summit, Bregoč (2014 m.), starts at Orlovačko Jezero.

== History ==
In addition to its natural beaty and lakes, Zelengora is rich in cultural and historical monuments dating back to the Middle Ages. Numerous sites across the mountain (such as Čengića Bara and the surrounding plateaus) feature necropolises with stećci - medieval tombstones that are recognized as part of UNESCO's protected World Heritage.
