= Tjentište =

- Village
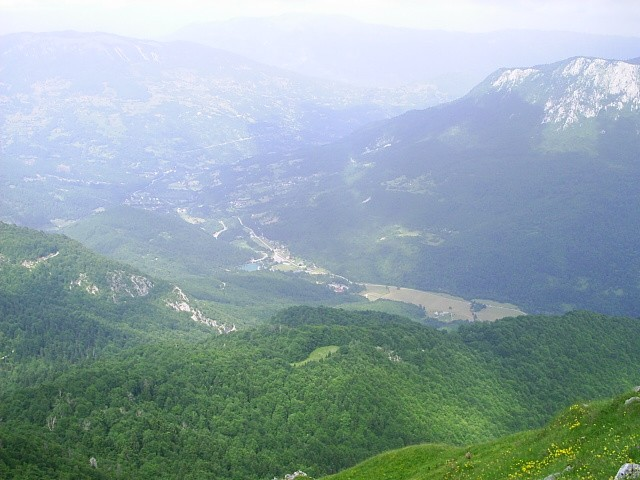
- View of Tjentište.

- Location within Bosnia and Herzegovina
- Coordinates: 43°20′54″N 18°41′26″E
- Country: Bosnia and Herzegovina
- Entity: Republika Srpska
- Municipality: Foča
- Time zone: UTC+1 (CET)
  - Summer (DST): UTC+2 (CEST)

Tjentište (Serbian Cyrillic: Тјентиште) is a village and a valley in the municipality of Foča, Republika Srpska, Bosnia and Herzegovina. It lies entirely within Sutjeska National Park.

== History ==
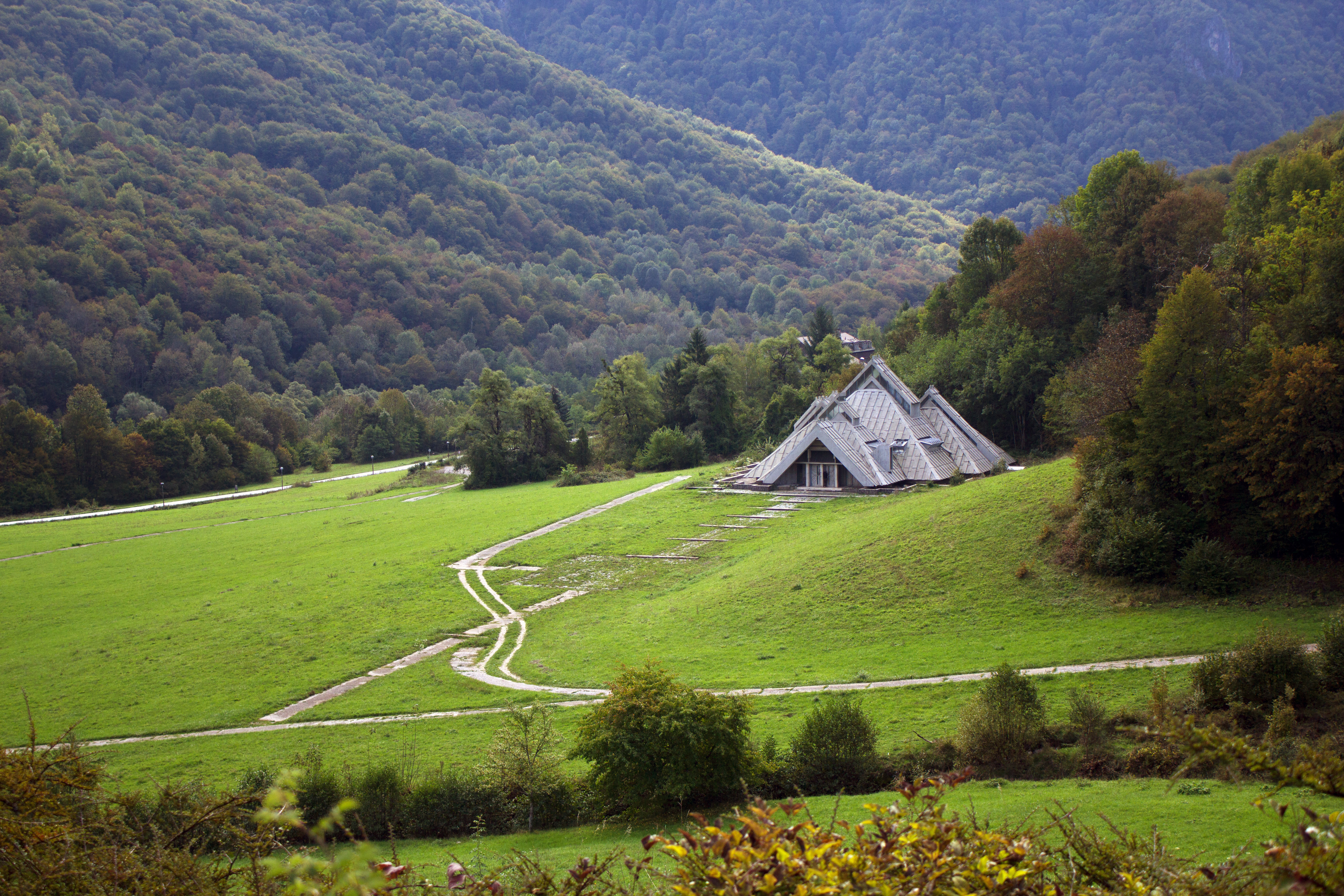
Museum of the Battle of the Sutjeska

The village was known for the war memorials commemorating the 1943 Battle of the Sutjeska (Operation Fall Schwarz); the Valley of Heroes (1971) by Miodrag Živković and the concrete Memorial House by Ranko Radović, which contains unfinished frescoes by famed Croatian artist Krsto Hegedušić.
