= Vicko Krstulović =

Yugoslav communist revolutionary

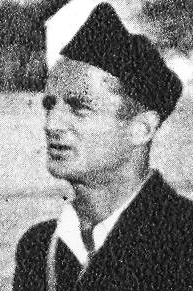
- Vicko Krstulović during World War II.

3rd President of the Presidency of the Croatian Parliament^{[b]}
- In office 18 March 1952 – 6 February 1953
- Prime Minister: Vladimir Bakarić
- Preceded by: Karlo Mrazović
- Succeeded by: Zlatan Sremec (as Speaker of Parliament)

Minister of Internal Affairs of the People's Republic of Croatia
- In office April 1945 – January 1946

Minister of Labour
- In office January 1946 – February 1951

Personal details
- Born: 27 April 1905 Split, Dalmatia, Austria-Hungary
- Died: 28 September 1988 (aged 83) Split, SR Croatia, SFR Yugoslavia
- Party: League of Communists of Yugoslavia (1922–1988)
- Awards: People's Hero of Yugoslavia

Military service
- Allegiance: Yugoslavia
- Branch/service: Yugoslav Partisans
- Years of service: 1941–1945
- Rank: Major general
- Commands: 9th Dalmatian Division
- Battles/wars: Yugoslav Front
- ^b The President of the Presidency of the Croatian Parliament was the office of the head of state, the Speaker of Parliament was a separate office.

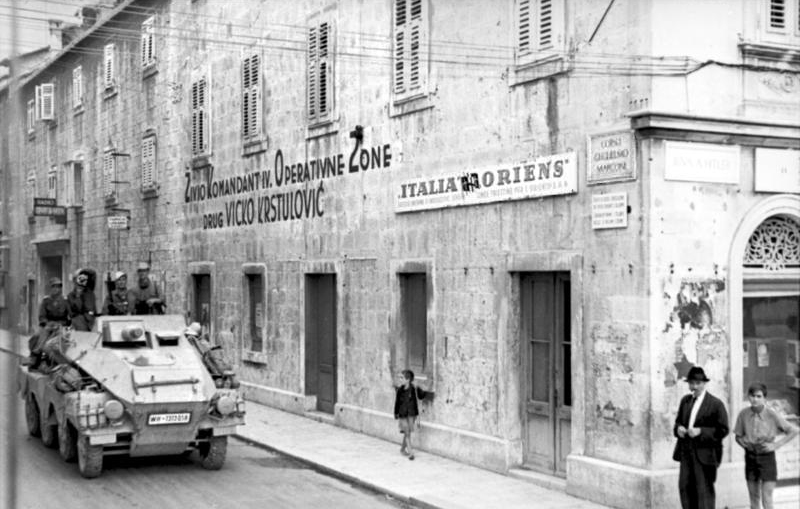
German troops entering the Riva promenade in 1943 (the corner of modern-day Marmont street). The sign reads "Long live the IV. Operational Zone Commander, Comrade Vicko Krstulović".

Vicko Krstulović (27 April 1905 – 28 September 1988) was a Croatian Yugoslav communist revolutionary, the most prominent Partisan military commander from Dalmatia during World War II, and a post-war communist politician. He was an illegal communist activist during the 1920s and 1930s in Split at a time when communist sympathizers were brutally persecuted by the Yugoslav monarchy. As an officer in the Partisans during World War II, he was in charge of creating and organising the resistance movement in Dalmatia. In Communist Yugoslavia, he worked in various government offices and was remembered for his work and contribution to his native Split.

== Early years (1905–1918) ==
Vicko Krstulović was born on 27 April 1905 in Split during the former Austria-Hungary empire. He was born to a labour family. His father worked in the Split fields as an agriculturist. Vicko was introduced in politics thanks to his father who was a social democrat. His father was the first person to carry the red flag during the Labour Day parade in Split.

When his father was mobilised for World War I, Vicko was forced to carry on his work in the fields. His father returned from the war with an illness which prevented him from doing hard work. At that time, Vicko would hide people in his fields that escaped mobilisation for the war. Vicko like most Split residents supported the Kingdom of Serbia and was a fierce opponent of the Austria-Hungary empire which ruled Dalmatia with repression.

== Communist revolutionary ==
=== Illegal political activism (1919–1937) ===
After the war, Vicko expected much from the newly formed Kingdom of Serbs, Croats and Slovenes but it proved to be a disaster. In 1919, the Communist Party of Yugoslavia was founded and Vicko was attracted by its ideas. In 1920, after the Communists won a large number of the cities in the local elections, the government banned them from acting legally and they became a forbidden party.

At that time in 1920, Vicko became a member of the League of Communist Youth of Yugoslavia. He worked as an illegal and was obligated to spread forbidden communist material around the city (mostly books). In 1922, he officially joined the Communist Party of Yugoslavia. He became a member of the Dalmatian communist committee where he helped organise secret meetings, welcome foreign communist activists to the city and hide them. He also helped in organising Trade unions.

In the 1930s, his house was under raid by the police, and he was arrested for dispatching illegal material. He was tortured and sentenced to prison. During that time, his mother died from illness after which he swore on her grave that he will avenge her.

=== Secretary of the Provincial committee of Communist party of Croatia for Dalmatia (1938–1941) ===
During the 1930s, the head of the Dalmatian communists was called Jelaska. He used the communists party in the city for his own pleasure and was neglecting the organisation. Vicko argued that he didn't expand the activity to the Dalmatia hinterlands which would prove devastating in later years. In 1937, Vicko attended a meeting in Zagreb where the Communist Party of Croatia was established.

In 1939, Vicko was made the secretary of the Dalmatian communists. At the time, he was working at the Split shipyard. Vicko began organising the party and expanding it. He welcomed high-ranking members of the party such as Josip Broz Tito, Edvard Kardelj and Rade Končar. He organised labour strikes in Split and managed to strengthen the party.

In 1940, Vicko attended the 5th state conference of the Communist Party of Yugoslavia where the defence of Yugoslavia's independence and the mobilisation of the masses in the struggle to solve the internal social and national problems was discussed. Vicko was one of the organisers for the 1941 Tripartite Pact protests in Split. When the Invasion of Yugoslavia began, Vicko urged party members to join the army and fight against the fascists and collaborators. When it was clear that Yugoslavia was losing, the party members were told to hide as many weapons as possible for the upcoming armed guerilla resistance.

== World War II ==
=== Organising the first partisan detachments (1941) ===
After Yugoslavia lost the war, the Dalmatian coast along with Split was occupied by the Italian army. On 10 April 1941, the German puppet state and Italian protectorate called Independent State of Croatia (NDH) was established in Zagreb. Soon after, Vicko Krstulović went to Zagreb for a meeting where the communist party planned an armed resistance. Since Vicko was the Dalmatian committee secretary, he was obligated to prepare and lead the resistance in Dalmatia. He was given only a few months to prepare.

Vicko expressed his concerns. He believed that it was impossible to prepare in such a low amount of time, but he was forced to do so. In August 1941, a few partisan detachments were sent from Dalmatian cities with the most notable one being the 1st Split Partisan Detachment which was made of 44 fighters. They went from Split to the Dalmatian hinterlands. Their goal was to reach the Dinara mountains and connect with the resistance movement in Bosnia. The detachment was quickly spotted by the Ustaše militia and Italian army and engaged in combat. After a few hours of fighting, they were outnumbered by the Italian and Ustaše forces and were forced to surrender. 25 fighters were captured, and 13 fighters escaped back to Split. The 24 partisan prisoners were sentenced to death by NDH court in Sinj and executed by the Italians and Ustashe on 26 August 1941 at Ruduša near Sinj.

The rest of the partisan detachments that went from Dalmatia also failed. Most of them were forced to retreat from the hinterlands. Vicko Krstulović later received a letter from the Central Committee for Communist Party of Croatia where he was blamed for the failure of those actions, but he replied that it was their fault. The Central committee for Communist party of Croatia sent Rade Končar to help Krstulović organise another attempt of reaching the Dinara mountains.

=== Commander of the Dalmatian partisan units (1941–1943) ===
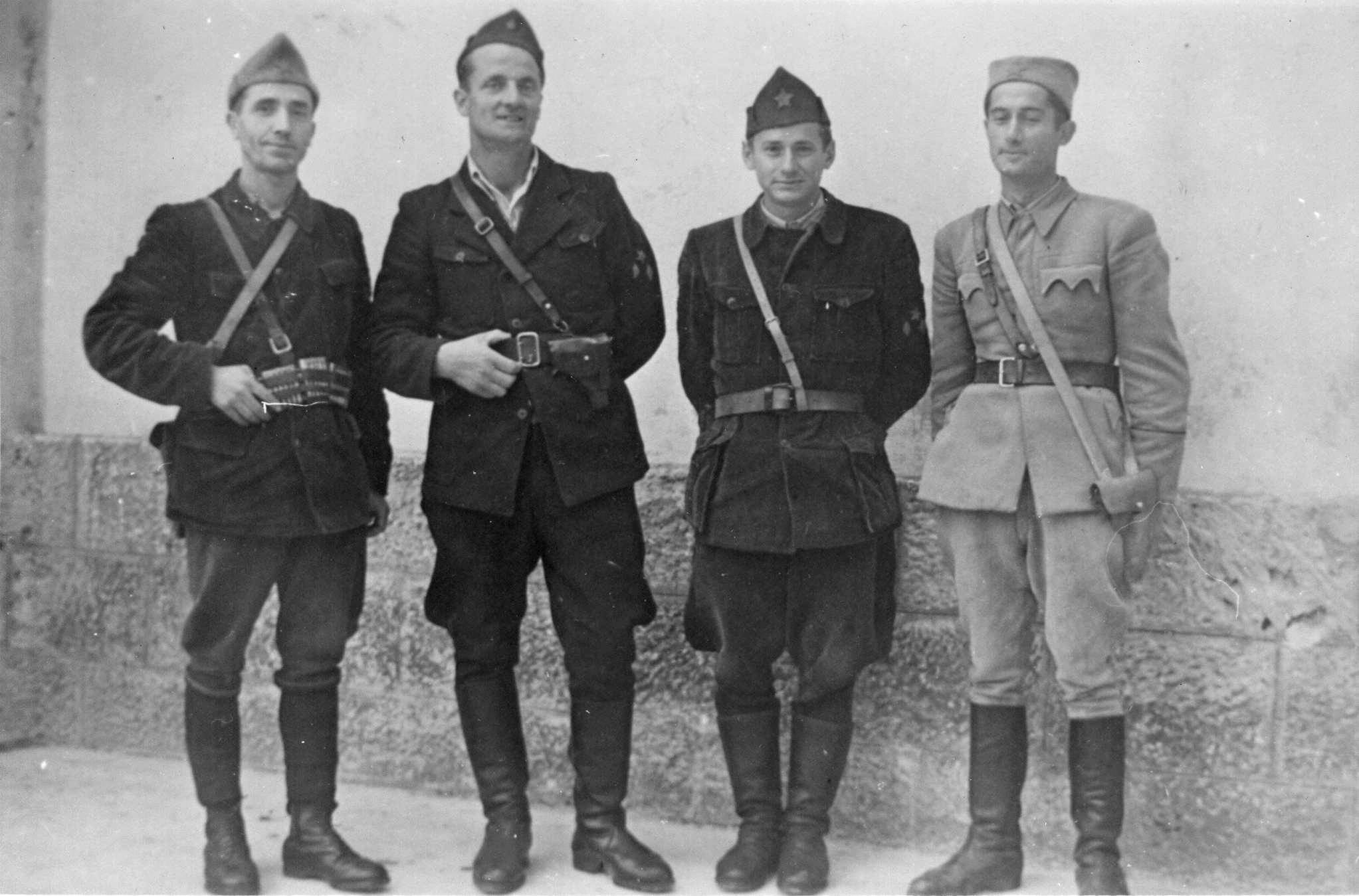
The staff of the 4th operational zone in September 1942. Krstulović is the second from the left.

In November 1941, Vicko managed to reach the Dinara mountains and he became the commander of the Dinara partisan detachment. That meant that all of the partisan units in Dalmatia were gradually coming under his command. The partisans in Dalmatia fought mostly against the Italian army, Ustaše militia, Croatian Home Guard and the Chetniks. They used guerrilla warfare. At first, they would use road ambushes against enemy vehicles and steal as many weapons and ammo as possible. They also attacked Ustaše guard posts in small villages. In 1942, the area around Muć was the first major liberated territory in Dalmatia. Vicko Krstulović became the commander of the 4th operational zone of Supreme HQ of Croatia in April 1942. The 4th zone was the entire territory of Dalmatia west from river Neretva.

He also started creating national liberation committees in various liberated villages. They were created for the purpose of installing the new partisan government. He also worked hard on ensuring the arrival of new partisan recruits from the coastal areas and islands of Dalmatia.

Vicko also helped the local resistance movement in Herzegovina called Starac Vujadin. They were Serb fighters who were under the threat of the Ustaše militia and Home guard. Vicko knew there was a danger of them joining the Chetniks, so he tried to keep them with the partisans. Vicko knew the importance Serbian settlers in Dalmatia at that time because they made more than half of the Dalmatian partisans. The Serbs were under the constant threat from the Ustaše government, and the Italians knew that so they would send them to Split as refugees and then they would be mobilised in the Chetniks who were allies with the Italian army. Vicko helped organise the partisan resistance in Bukovica which was near the Chetnik-Italian controlled area of Kninska Krajina.

In July 1942, Vicko went to the mountain Cincar to attend a meeting with the Supreme HQ of the National Liberation Army of Yugoslavia and the commander in chief, Josip Broz Tito. Vicko was given orders to create partisan brigades for the upcoming actions. In August 1942, he joined the liberation of Livno in Bosnia. There he created a Dalmatian liberation committee which would ensure better connections with the other committee branches in Dalmatia.

By the end of 1942 and beginning of 1943, there were 5 new brigades created in Dalmatia. On 13 February 1943 in Imotski, the 3rd, 4th and 5th Dalmatian brigade merged into the 9th Dalmatian Division under the leadership of Vicko Krstulović.

=== Battle for the Wounded (February–April 1943) ===
In the beginning of 1943, the Germans launched the Fourth Enemy Offensive. Their goal was to surround and destroy the partisan forces in western Bosnia and in other parts of Independent State of Croatia. Josip Broz Tito along with the Supreme HQ decided to evacuate the entire area and cross the Neretva river. They were meant to reach Montenegro.

Vicko Krstulović and the 9th Dalmatian division were given a hard task to protect the flanks facing Jablanica and Neretva from the difficult and craggy terrain of Imotski and Biokovo. The division faced heavy attacks from the Germans, Italians, Ustashe and Chetniks. The enemy used heavy aviation, tanks and artillery which gradually forced all 3 partisan brigades to slowly retreat to the right shore of the Neretva River.

While the 9th division was under critical pressure from the enemy and forced to stay in the hills above Neretva, they were still obligated by the orders of Tito and the HQ to take and move the Central hospital and heavy wounded through the mountain terrain of Dinara, Bikovo, Kamešnica and Dalmatia. Vicko refused to accept those orders because he knew they were impossible and suicidal.

After a meeting with the 9th division command, he went to see Tito in the village of Gračanica. He was determined that the only way to save the wounded was to cross the Neretva River on the right shore and go to Montenegro. After hours of talking, Vicko was allowed to continue his plan. He crossed the river with the 9th division and the Central hospital. They moved through the mountain range of Prenj and territory of Glavatičevo to the Boračko Lake. The fighters and wounded suffered from Typhoid fever, Hypothermia and Starvation. The 9th division ended their 2-month long campaign with the liberation of the town Nevesinje.

On 14 April 1943, the 9th Dalmatian division was disbanded in the Kifino village due to a big number of wounded and deceased fighters. The order was given by Tito and the Supreme HQ. Vicko believed that it was a big mistake to disband the division. He thought that it was a conspiracy against the Dalmatian partisans.

=== Battle of the Sutjeska (May–June 1943) ===
After the 9th division was disbanded, Vicko joined the Supreme HQ and Tito. The entire Yugoslav liberation army was heading to cross the Sutjeska river. The Axis rallied 127,000 land troops and 300 aeroplanes for the Fifth Enemy Offensive. Their goal was to eliminate Tito and central partisan forces.

Vicko and the Supreme HQ went through the Durmitor massive between the Tara and Piva rivers in the mountainous areas of northern Montenegro. Vicko travelled with his family and with the famous poet Vladimir Nazor. They faced heavy fog and slippery terrain in the mountains. The area was Chetnik controlled, and food supply was extremely low. In the early morning, they managed to cross the Sutjeska river under heavy rain and German mortar shelling. When the weather cleared that day, German aviation started advancing.

The partisans and HQ quickly advanced between Gornje and Donje Bare to the Hrčavka river. They were under German fire and Vicko almost lost his entire family. Tito was also wounded from an aviation bomb. The Supreme HQ managed to reach Miljevina. They settled there and were almost liquidated by a German task force, but the partisans managed to react first and execute the Germans. The HQ managed to reach the Red Rocks at Romanija and Vicko at that point lost connection with them so he went to the 2nd Dalmatian brigade HQ.

=== Return to Dalmatia and the 1st liberation of Split (August–September 1943) ===
In the beginning of August 1943, Vicko was with Tito and the Supreme HQ at a party conference of the 1st Proleter brigade in Petrovo polje. Vicko was determined to go back in Dalmatia along with the 1st and 2nd Dalmatian brigade because he knew that the Italians were collapsing after the Allied invasion of Sicily.

He held a private conversation with Tito and managed to convince him of his plans. He was given only the 1st Dalmatian brigade because the 2nd brigade was going to Montenegro. After that, Tito relieved him of his commanding duty and made him responsible only for political assignments on the field. Vicko believed that he was being punished for disobeying his orders at Neretva.

Vicko returned to Dalmatia on 22 August 1943 with the 1st brigade and the 4th operational zone was again established. He became the zone commander but was limited to only political work. On 3 September 1943, the Armistice of Cassibile was signed and Italy capitulated, but the Italians were still holding Split and refused to surrender to the partisan forces. After days of negotiations, the partisans finally got in contact with general Emilio Becucci. On 16 September 1943, the surrender of the Italian army was signed at the hotel Park in Split. General Koča Popović and Ivo Lola Ribar signed the treaty in the name of the Yugoslav army. After that, Split officially became the biggest liberated city in occupied Europe. Vicko entered Split along with the other high-ranking partisan officers on 10 September. On that day, Vicko and Ivo Lola Ribar started negotiating with general Becucci for the immediate handover of all weapons from the Italian army.

At that time, the Sixth Enemy Offensive was under way and the German forces were gradually coming closer to occupying the Dalmatian coast which was abandoned by the Italians. The partisans started transporting weapons and ammo from the city to the hinterland before the Germans occupy the city.

The 1st Proletarian Brigade and the other partisan units were holding the Klis-Sinj line against the enemy. Tito gave the order that the Germans were to be stopped from entering Split for as long as possible. The Germans were surrounded in Klis, Sinj and Dicmo but the partisan units were badly synchronised due to a lack of communication. A great number of volunteers from Split joined the partisans and they were able to cover the loss in numbers. The 1st Proletarian brigade managed to repeal the German reinforcements in Imotski but the enemy kept reinforcing even more. The partisans saw a chance of conquering the larger Split area and repealing the Germans from it. The partisan units launched an offensive on Dicmo and Sinj but they all failed. The Germans quickly started a counter-offensive and began advancing on Split.

The 4th operational command gave the order to evacuate all weapons, military equipment, and personnel to Dinara. Vicko and Ivo Lola Ribar left Split and went through Kaštela to Muć and Cetina. They made contact with the 4th Krajina division and managed to deliver the Italian equipment. On 25 September 1943, the partisans left their battle positions and on 27 September, the German forces entered Split.

=== Political work and the 2nd liberation of Split (1943–1944) ===
In October 1943, the 8th Dalmatian Corps took control of the 4th operational zone and Vicko was restricted to political work at ZAVNOH and AVNOJ. On 29 November 1943, Vicko attended the famous 2nd AVNOJ meeting in Jajce where the National Committee for the Liberation of Yugoslavia was established. It was the highest governing body of the new Yugoslav republic. Vicko was elected as a member of AVNOJ.

By late 1943, Vicko was stationed on the Adriatic island of Vis which was occupied by the Commonwealth and American troops. He worked on the transport of injured soldiers and civilians to Italy and El Shatt in Egypt. He called Tito to join him on Vis where he could be safe from enemy attacks but Tito rejected the idea. In May 1944, Tito and the Supreme HQ were targets of a German airborne assault in Drvar. Tito barely escaped from the German breach and was quickly transported to Vis by the British. Vicko was present during the Treaty of Vis signing between Tito and the royal government representative, Ivan Šubašić.

In September 1944, the 8th Dalmatian corps began with the offensive on Dalmatia. By mid-October, they managed to reach Split and liberate most of the Dalmatia region. On 21 October, the 2nd liberation of Split was underway. The Germans used heavy artillery from Klis to slow them from the north but the Yugoslav Navy managed to offload reinforcements just east of Split. The main assault began on 25 October and the partisan troops managed to defeat the German-Ustashe war machine in a day. On the morning of 26 October 1944, fighters of the 10th brigade from the 20th partisan division entered and liberated Split for the 2nd and final time.

On 27 October, Vicko Krstulović was the first to arrive in Split by boat with the famous composer Ivo Tijardović. He was greeted by a big crowd in the Split port. This marked the end of Vicko's war campaign.

== Postwar political career ==
=== Political functions in Federal Yugoslavia ===
In December 1944, Vicko was made the commissioner for industry and trade of ZAVNOH. He stayed in Split during the first few months of liberation. In April 1945, he became the minister of internal affairs of the newly established Federal State of Croatia. He moved to Zagreb after the Ustashe government fled from it in May 1945. In January 1946, he became the minister of labour and maritime affairs in the Federal Executive Council of Yugoslavia. He then moved to Belgrade with his family.

In April 1951, he became the president of the regional committee of the Communist Party of Croatia for Dalmatia and in February 1952, he became the President of the Presidency of the Croatian Parliament which was at the time the equivalent position in the People's Republic of Croatia to a head of state in other countries. After his term ended, he became the member of the Federal Executive Council in February 1953.

From 1954 to 1958, he was the committee president in the Croatian Parliament and a representative in the parliament from 1945 to 1963. From 1963 to 1967, he was the president of the budget committee in the Federal Assembly and a representative in the assembly from 1945 to 1967.

=== Unrealised ideas and criticism of the state policy ===
Vicko Krstulović was one of the designers of the coat of arms of the Socialist Republic of Croatia. Thanks to him, the sea was put in there. He also did much for his native Split and Dalmatia. As a committee president of Dalmatia, he was sent to Split in order to stop the chaos which was being done there. He helped on creating transportation systems in Split and connecting it more with the rest of the country.

Vicko represented the idea that the new railway should go from Sarajevo to Split, and not to Kardeljevo but his idea was rejected. Vicko wrote the Adriatic Orientation of Yugoslavia. It was a book about the sea potential that Yugoslavia has and how it should be used. He tried to persuade Tito on reading it but it was never seriously taken.

Vicko criticised the new direction of the Communist Party of Yugoslavia. He was against changing the party name in 1952 to League of Communists, a move taken to symbolize the loosening of party controls that began some four years earlier. He believed that the party was rejecting its revolutionary path and that it was starting to accept a bureaucratic-dogmatic way of functioning. He knew that the party was slowly becoming open to extreme careerism and it was ignoring all the old party members. The party members who were longer in the party than Tito were especially ignored and put aside.

Vicko was later relieved of any important political duty after he made remarks that Tito and the other old guard officials should retire and leave the country to younger generations.

== Final years ==
Vicko spent his last years of life in his native Split. He was still active in social life and he still gave interviews to journalists. In September 1988, he was admitted to the Military hospital in Split for treatment but during a routine therapy session, the doctors used electrical equipment not knowing he had a pacemaker. On 28 September 1988, Vicko Krstulović died due to medical complications.

After his death, his son Vladimir Krstulović gave all of Vicko's possessions and archives to the Historical museum in Belgrade.

== Private life ==
Vicko was married to Lucija Krstulović and had 4 children: Maksim, Nataša, Viborg and Vladimir. His wife and 3 children, Maksim, Nataša and toddler Viborg were with him during the Battle of Neretva and Sutjeska. During the long marches between those battles, his son Maksim fell off a horse and injured his arm which would leave permanent damage. His daughter Nataša suffered from typhoid fever at Neretva and almost died during the crossing of the river. His fourth and youngest son Vladimir was born after the war.

Maksim Krstulović became a painter and critical intellectual who wrote articles that were more to the left than the Yugoslav politics was at the time. He caused controversy and in 1974, he was killed at his apartment in London. The killer was never caught but some suspect that it was done by the Yugoslav State Security Administration.

His youngest son Vladimir Krstulović was responsible for the publishing of Vicko's memoirs in 2012.

Political offices
Preceded by Karlo Mrazović	President of the Presidency of the Croatian Parliament; 1952–1953	Succeeded by Zlatan Sremec as Speaker of Parliament
