= Preodačko Lake =

- Location within Bosnia and Herzegovina
- Interactive map of Preodačko Lake
- Location: Bosnia and Herzegovina
- Coordinates: 44°12′42″N 16°35′20″E
- Type: Lake
- Etymology: village Preodac
- Part of: Una
- Primary inflows: Unac
- Primary outflows: Unac
- Catchment area: Black Sea
- Built: after 1950

Preodačko Lake (Serbian Cyrillic: Преодачко језеро) is an artificial lake of Bosnia and Herzegovina on the Unac River. The Unac River rises beneath Šator mountain, flows through the municipality of Bosansko Grahovo and Drvar and finally meets Una River in Martin Brod. It's created by damming the Unac a kilometer or so from its source in the field called Preodačko Polje, where the river formed a small natural marsh. A few kilometres downstream a larger Župica Lake (also known as Prekajsko Lake) is created with a constriction of second, bigger dam. Both lakes serve for water supply only. From here the river Unaç flows through town of Drvar, and Drvarsko Polje in the municipality of Drvar, where it enters confines of Una National Park, and after passing through a canyon it meat the Una in town of Martin Brod.

== See also ==
- List of lakes of Bosnia and Herzegovina
