= List of lakes of Bosnia and Herzegovina =

Natural lakes in Bosnia and Herzegovina take 67.5 square kilometres (26.1 sq mi), which is a little more than 0.12% of the total surface area of Bosnia and Herzegovina. Buško Blato is the largest lake, its size being 56.7 km^{2}. Blidinje lake is the largest natural mountain lake in Bosnia and Herzegovina, with surface area varying between 2.5 and 6 square kilometres (0.97 and 2.32 sq mi), and Buško Blato lake with its size of 56.7 square kilometres (21.9 sq mi) is the biggest artificial accumulation in Bosnia and Herzegovina; this lake was made from accumulation of water from the Buško Blato marshland, earlier natural slough and morass system. The total size of all lakes is 1/10 as large as the world average. Because of this, natural lakes in Bosnia and Herzegovina are not economically important.

All the natural lakes of Bosnia and Herzegovina are younger than 9000 years, unlike the other European lakes. This was concluded after the explorations of absolute age of the lake silt. It was written in older literature that the mountain lakes of Bosnia and Herzegovina were made because of glacial movements, and the lower altitude lakes of river flows in combination with glaciations, but many other facts were unattended. In the mountain parts of Bosnia and Herzegovina animal husbandry had a crucial impact on lakes. Every ranch had its own lake which served as a cattle watering-place. If there were no natural lakes in Bosnia and Herzegovina, then the artificial lakes were made, for example Jugovo Lake at Zelengora mountain.

Unlike the mountain lakes of Bosnia and Herzegovina, Plivsko Lake was made of a natural chemical precipitate of carbonate minerals and forming travertine sediment in the process. The subsistence of these lakes is highly threatened by urbanisation, which began in the 1960s.

Hutovo Blato was made in the valley of the Neretva river and its existence depends on the energy and meliorative attempts in the underflow of Neretva river. Ichthyological research of natural lakes of Bosnia and Herzegovina began in 1924 and that research determined good natural and biological opportunities for the fish farming.

== List of lakes ==
Lake	Origin	Rive/Mountainr/Village/Town/Municipality
Alagovac Lake	Natural	Nevesinje
Balkana Lake	* Natural/Artificial	Mrkonjić Grad
Bara Lake		
Bardača Lake	Natural	Srbac
Bašigovačko Lake	Natural	Živinice
Bijelo Lake	Natural	Treskavica
Bijelo lake	Natural	Zelengora
Bilećko Lake	Artificial	Bileća
Bistarac Lake	Natural	Lukavac
Bijelo Borje Lake	Natural	Bijelo Borje - Vareš
Blatačko Lake	Natural	Konjic/Bjelašnica
Blidinje Lake	* Natural/Artificial	Tomislavgrad/Posušje, Vran Mt., Čvrsnica Mt.
Bočac Lake	Artificial	Bočac
Boračko Lake	Natural	Konjic/Glavatičevo
Breštica Lake	Natural	Banovići
Bukvensko Lake		
Busača Lake		
Busija Lake	Natural	Glamoč
Buško Blato	Artificial	Livno
Bužimsko Lake	Artificial	Bužim
Crno Lake	Natural	Treskavica
Crno Lake	Natural	Zelengora
Crvenjak Lake	Natural	Čvrsnica
Deransko Lake	Natural	Hutovo Blato
Donje Bare	Natural	Zelengora
Drenova Lake	Artificial	Prnjavor
Drijen Vrelo	Natural	Hutovo Blato
Goransko Jezero	Artificial	Doboj
Gornje Bare	Natural	Zelengora
Grabovičko Lake	Artificial	Jablanica
Grahovčići Lake	* Artificial/Natural	Travnik
Grajseljići Lake	Artificial	Ulog
Gubinsko Lake		
Gvozno Lake	Natural	Ulog
Hazna Lake	Artificial	Gradačac
Hrast Lake	Natural	Glamoč
Humci Lake		Čelić
Idovačko Lake	Natural	Raduša
Ispod Pržića Malo Lake	* Artificial/Natural	Vareš
Ispod Pržića Veliko Lake	* Artificial/Natural	Vareš
Jablaničko Lake	Artificial	Jablanica/Konjic
Jasikovac Lake	Natural	Drvar
Jelim Lake	Natural	Hutovo Blato
Jelovac Lake		
Jugovo Lake	* Natural/Artificial	Zelengora
Kalemovo Lake		Prozor-Rama, at an elevation of 900m
Kladopoljsko Lake	Natural	Zelengora
Klinje Lake	Artificial	Gacko
Kotlaničko Lake	Natural	Zelengora
Krenica Lake	Natural	Drinovačko field
Kukavičko Lake	Natural	Kupres
Kvrkulja Lake		
Laminci Lake	Natural	Gradiška
Lipsko Lake	Artificial	Livno
Mali Lug	* Artificial/Natural	Fojnica
Malo Lake		
Malo Plivsko Lake	Natural	Jajce
Mandek Lake	Artificial	Livno
Mezgraja Lake	* Artificial/Natural	Ugljevik
Mijino Lake
Mlado Lake	* Artificial/Natural	Kakanj
Modračko Lake	Artificial	Lukavac
Mostarsko Lake	Artificial	Mostar
Nuga Lake	Artificial	Tihaljina
Okruglo	* Natural/Artificial	Pliva
Oličko Lake		
Opačićko Lake	Natural	Glamoč
Orah Lake	Natural	Hutovo Blato
Orlovačko Lake	Natural	Zelengora
Orlovo Lake		Ozren
Panonsko Lake	Artificial	Tuzla
Pasje Lake		
Paučko Lake	* Natural/Artificial	Kladanj
Pelagićevo Lake	* Artificial/Natural	Pelagićevo
Peručaćko Lake	Artificial	Peručac
Pijavičko Lake		
Platno Lake	Natural	Treskavica, above Veliko lake
Popovača Lake		
Preodačko Lake	Artificial	Drvar
Prokoško Lake	Natural	Vranica
Radovan Lake	Artificial	Gornji Vakuf
Ramsko Lake	Artificial	Prozor
Ramičko Lake	Natural	Banovići
Rastičevsko Lake	Natural	Kupres
Salakovačko Lake	Artificial	Mostar/Salakovac
Sniježnica	Artificial	Sniježnica, Teočak
Starača Lake		
Šatorsko Lake	Natural	Šator
Šićki Brod Lake	* Artificial/Natural	Šićki Brod
Škrka Lake	Natural	Hutovo Blato
Štirinsko Lake (Serbian: Штиринско Језеро / Štirinsko Jezero)	Natural	Zelengora
Trebinjsko Lake	Artificial	Trebinje
Tribistovo Lake	Artificial	Posušje
Turjača Lake	Natural	Kupres
Uloško Lake (a.k.a. Crvanjsko Lake)	Natural	Ulog
Vareš Lake	* Artificial/Natural	Vareš
Velež Lake		Velež
Veliki Lug	* Artificial/Natural	Fojnica
Veliko Lake	Natural	Treskavica
Veliko Plivsko Lake	* Natural/Artificial	Jajce
Vidara Lake	Artificial	Gradačac
Vijenac Lake	* Natural/Artificial	Banovići
Višegradsko Lake		Višegrad
Vrtliško Lake	* Artificial/Natural	Kakanj
Vrutak Lake	Artificial	Hutovo
Zanasovići Lake	* Artificial/Natural	Bugojno
Žabar Lake	Natural	Pelagicevo
Zvorničko Lake	Artificial	Zvornik
Ždrimačko Lake		Gornji Vakuf
Župica Lake, a.k.a. Prekajsko Lake	Artificial	Drvar

- * Artificial/Natural - Abandoned surface mineshaft subsequently flooded with underground wells;
- * Natural/Artificial - Of natural origin with a subsequent works on regulating the quantity of water and/or increasing depth and/or arranging the environment.

== See also ==
- List of lakes
- List of rivers of Bosnia and Herzegovina
