= Rmanj =

Rmanj may refer to:

- Rmanj Monastery, a Serbian Orthodox monastery near Martin Brod, Bosnia and Herzegovina
- Rmanj Fortress, a medieval fortress near Martin Brod, Bosnia and Herzegovina
