= Grahovsko Polje =

Karst field in Bosnia and Herzegovina

- Location within Bosnia and Herzegovina
- Floor elevation: 708–873 m (2,323–2,864 ft)
- Area: 23 km^{2} (8.9 mi^{2})

Geography
- Country: Bosnia and Herzegovina
- Canton: Canton 10
- Population center: Bosansko Grahovo
- Coordinates: 44.24°N 16.33°E
- Mountain range: Dinaric Alps

Location
- Interactive map of Grahovsko Polje

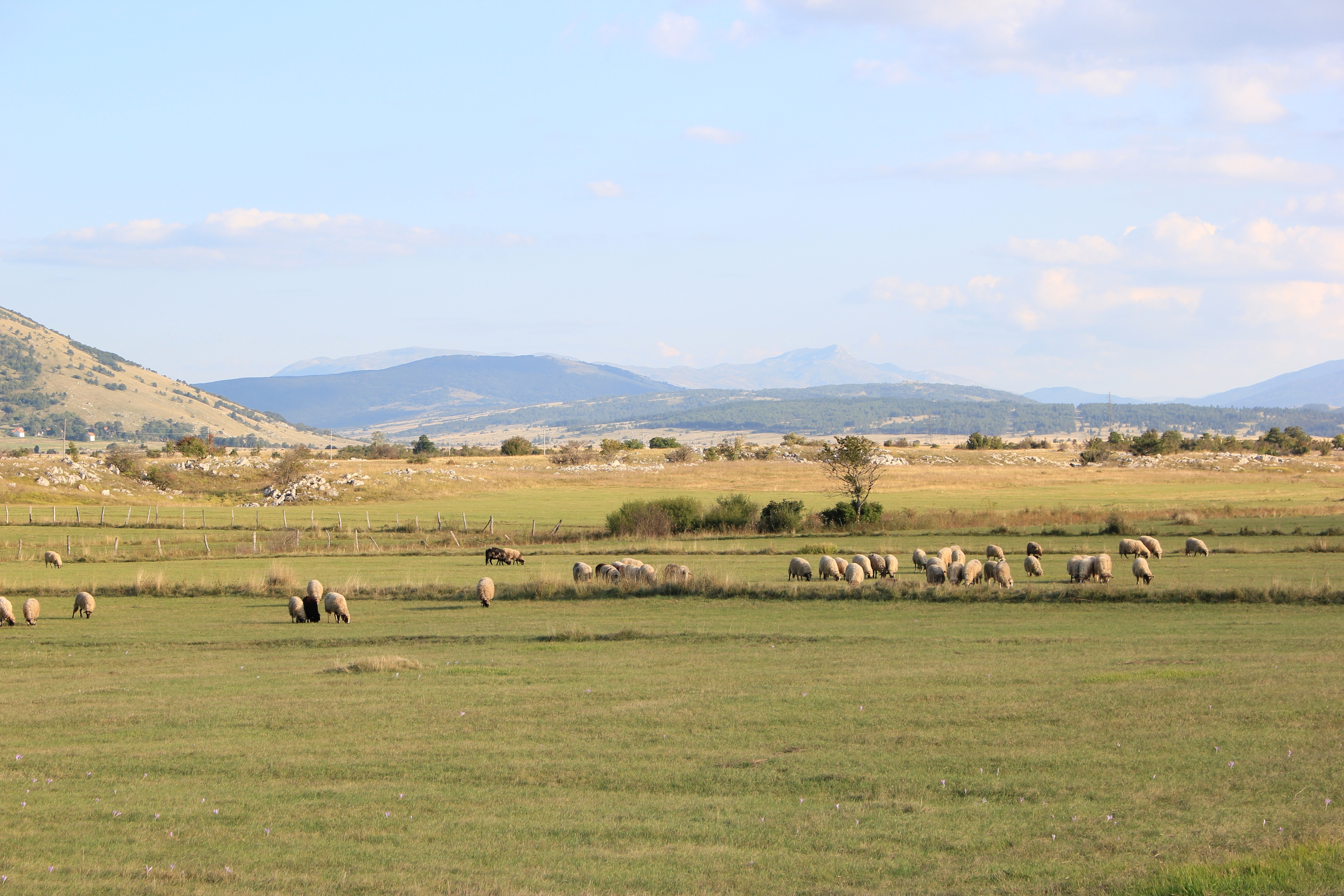
Grahovsko Polje

Grahovsko Polje is a polje (karst field) in Bosnia and Herzegovina, on the territory of Bosansko Grahovo municipality. It is surrounded by mountains: Dinara, Uilica, Jadovnik, Šator and Staretina.

It consists of several smaller spaces: Resenovačko Polje, Pašića, Crnoluško Polje and Ždralovac. It is located at an altitude of 708 - 873, average 782 meters a.s.l. and stretches from northwest to southeast with an approximate length of 29 km and a width to 5 km, total area of 23.0 square kilometers. In the south is Ždralovac and Livanjsko Polje with Livno, and in the north from Resenovačko Polje there is a pass Ploče at 985 meters a.s.l. towards Drvar, and an uvala towards Srb. The pass Derala at 965 meters a.s.l. over Stožište, between Dinara and Uilica, is a passage to the west towards Knin. Tičevska plateau at 1098 meters a.s.l. is a passage to the east towards Glamoč and Glamočko Polje.

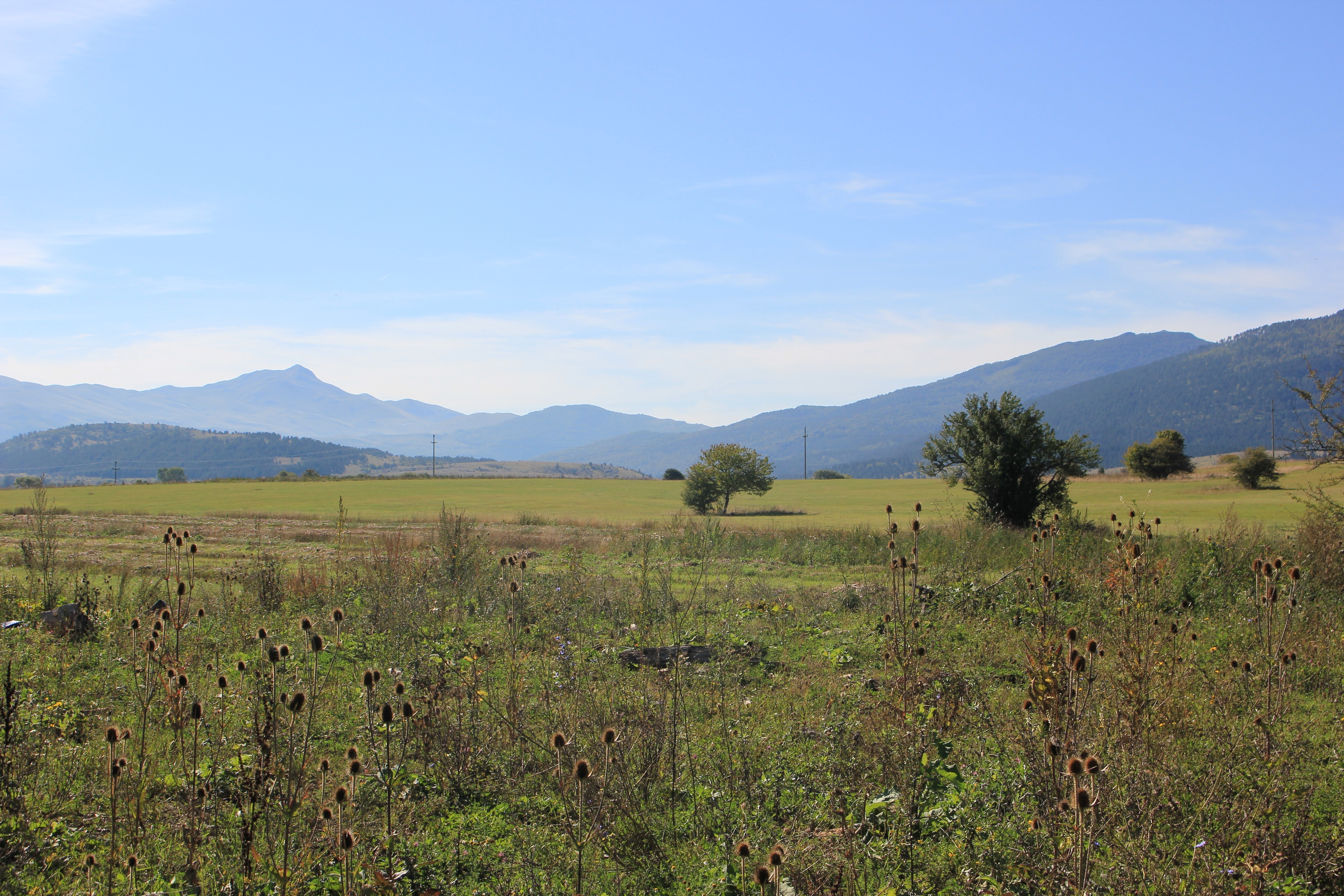
Grahovsko polje near Obljaj

From a hydrographic point of view, Grahovsko polje is divided into the basins of the Black and Adriatic seas. The watershed in Begovac is popularly known as Dijelovi. There is a natural Pečenačko lake in the field, and an artificial lake in Borovača. Grahovsko polje is influenced by the Mediterranean and continental climate, with long and strong winters and short and warm summers. Due to its location, this area has a very large number of sunny days a year.

In the area of Grahovski Polje there is a significant deposit of clay for the production of bricks and tiles, which has been exploited for more than 50 years and is not in production today.

Along with the abundance of karst formations, in the limestone massif of Stražbenica in the area of the village of Resanovci, there is one of the largest speleological systems in Bosnia and Herzegovina. There is the Ledenica cave.

The field is mostly suitable for cattle breeding.

The Glamočko Polje was inhabited since the time of the Neanderthals. The Illyrians from the Dicioni tribe lived there. The Romans built several settlements and roads.
