= Šatorsko Lake =

Lake in Bosnia and Herzegovina

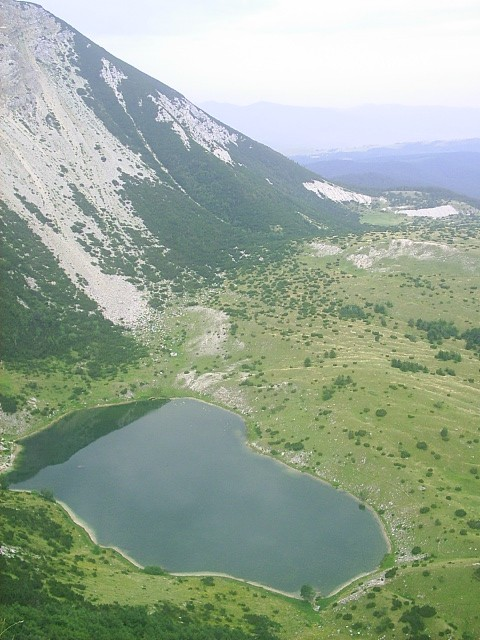

- Location within Bosnia and Herzegovina
- Interactive map of Šatorsko Lake
- Location: Dinaric Alps
- Coordinates: 44°9′54.54″N 16°36′5.54″E
- Basin countries: Bosnia and Herzegovina
- Max. length: 0.25 km (0.16 mi)
- Max. width: 0.125 km (0.078 mi)
- Max. depth: 6 m (20 ft)
- Surface elevation: 1,488 m (4,882 ft)

Šatorsko Lake (Serbian: Шаторско језеро, romanized: Šatorsko jezero) is a lake in the western part of Bosnia and Herzegovina located at 1488 metres above sea level, directly below Šator mountain (1872 m) in the Dinaric Alps.

The lake has a glacial origin and is 250 metres long and 120 metres wide, with the deepest point being 6 metres. The summer temperature is 17 °C while the source on the shore, which feeds it, is 6 °C. A few hundred metres to the north is the Bulino Vrelo spring, which is believed by the local population to have healing powers.

== See also ==
- Prekajsko Lake
- Unac River
- Drvar
- Neretva
