= Busača Lake =

Lake in Bosnia and Herzegovina

- Location within Bosnia and Herzegovina
- Interactive map of Busača Lake
- Location: Šamac, Bosnia and Herzegovina
- Coordinates: 44°58′42.5″N 18°29′22.3″E

Busača Lake is a lake of Bosnia and Herzegovina.

== See also ==
- List of lakes in Bosnia and Herzegovina
