= Drenova Lake =

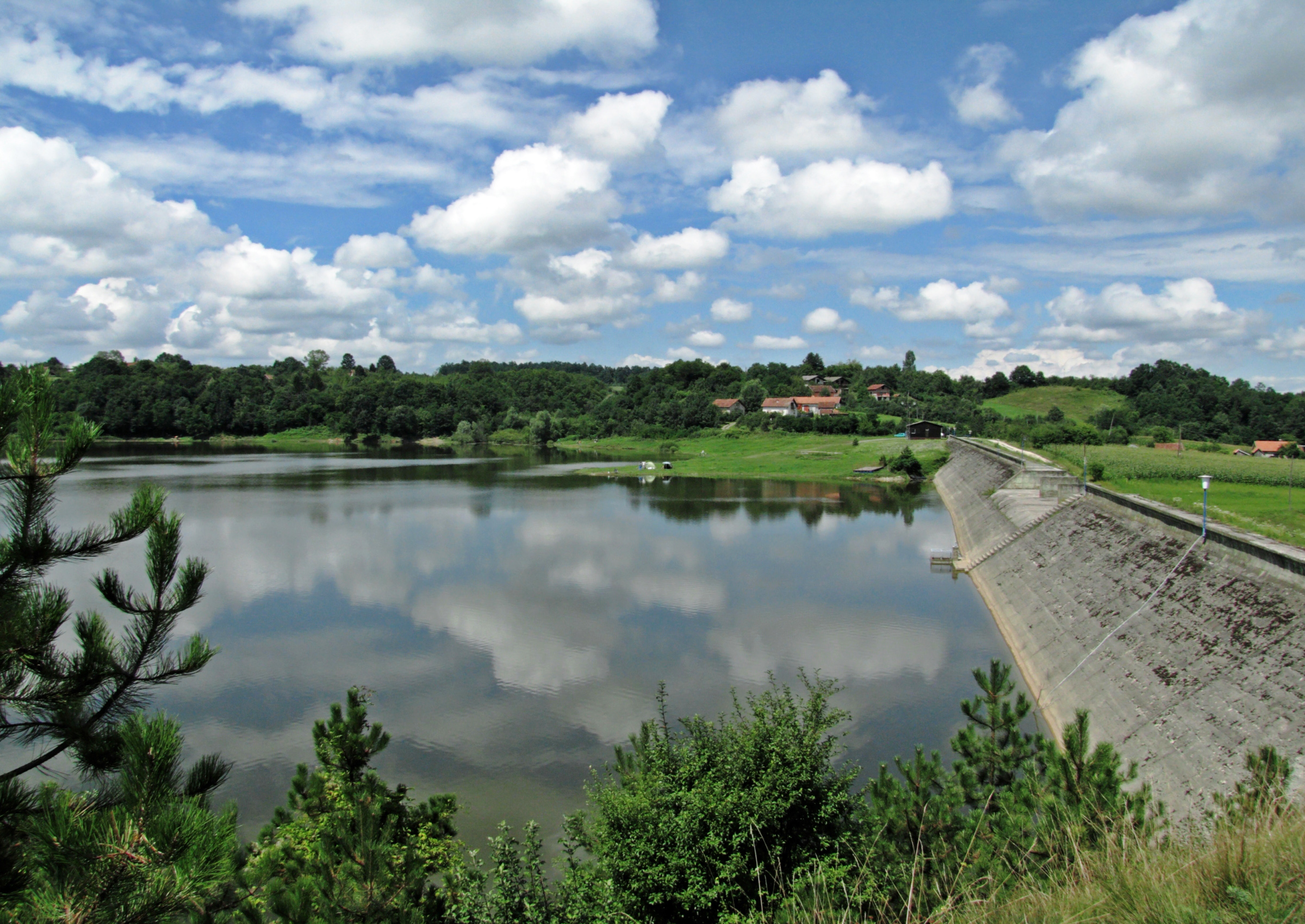

- Location within Bosnia and Herzegovina
- Interactive map of Drenova Lake
- Location: Prnjavor, Bosnia and Herzegovina
- Coordinates: 44°48′41″N 17°37′34″E
- Type: lake

Drenova Lake is a lake of Bosnia and Herzegovina. It is located in the municipality of Prnjavor. Drenova Lakewell-is known for its capital catches of catfish and carp. This lake, which is declared a special fishing district, boasts a record catch – a 104-kilo catfish. Fishing on the lake is done exclusively from the shore and any other kind of fishing is forbidden. The lake is rich in white fish as well, like pike, perch, chub, barbel and other species.

== See also ==
- List of lakes in Bosnia and Herzegovina
