= Kvrkulja Lake =

Lake in Bosnia and Herzegovina

- Location within Bosnia and Herzegovina
- Location: Velika Kladuša, Una-Sana Canton, Bosnia and Herzegovina
- Coordinates: 45.17167°N 15.85333°E
- Surface elevation: 146 m (479 ft)

Kvrkulja Lake (Bosnian: jezero Kvrkulja / Bosnian: језеро Квркуља) is a lake in Bosnia and Herzegovina. It is located at 146 metres (479 ft) above sea level in the municipality of Velika Kladuša in the Una-Sana Canton.

== See also ==
- List of lakes in Bosnia and Herzegovina
