= Klinje Lake =

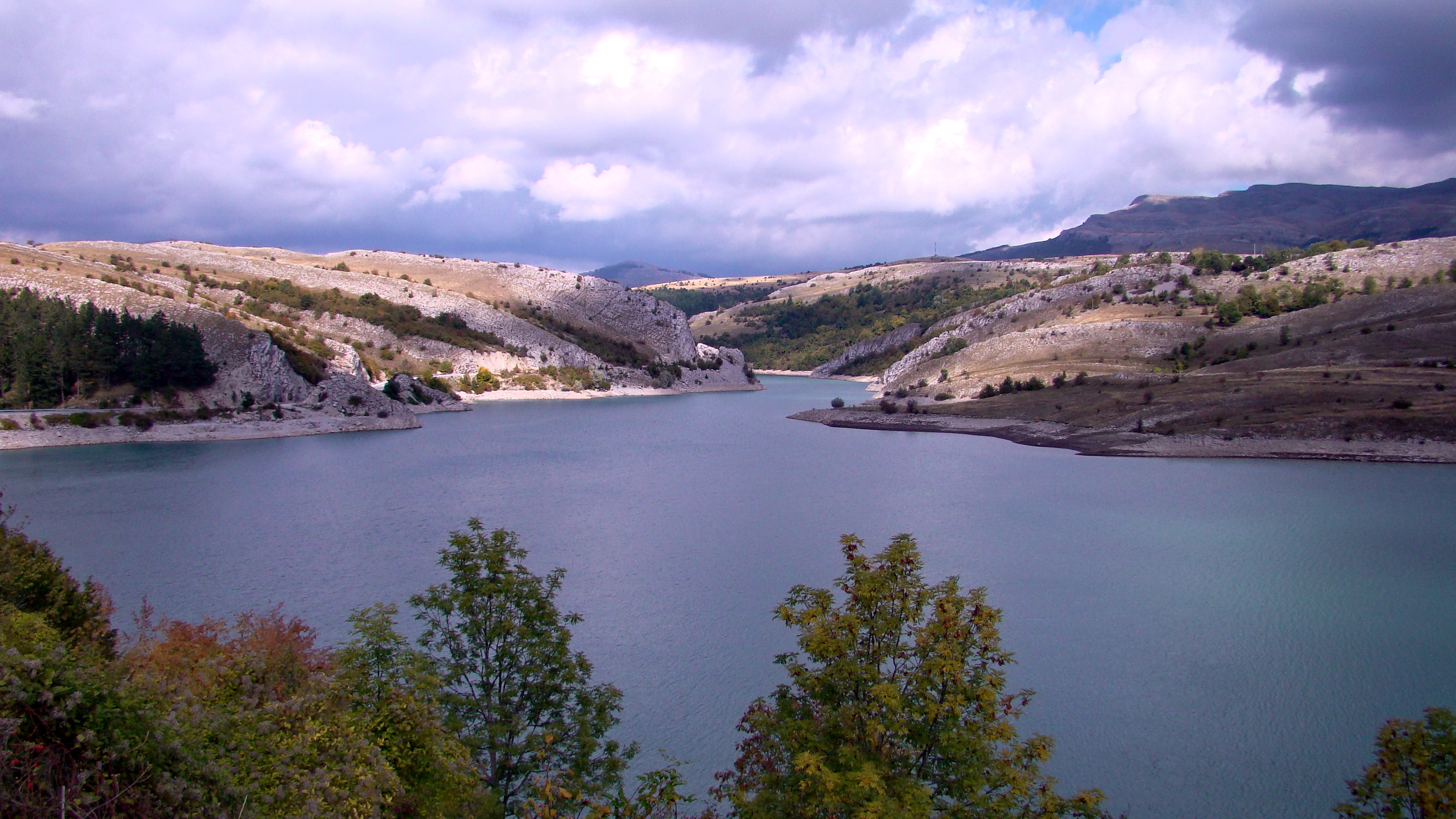
- Klinje Lake

- Location within Bosnia and Herzegovina
- Interactive map of Klinje Lake
- Location: Bosnia and Herzegovina
- Coordinates: 43°10′22″N 18°35′17″E
- Type: artificial lake

Klinje Lake (Serbian: Језеро Клиње, romanized: Jezero Klinje) is an artificial lake in Bosnia and Herzegovina. It is located in the municipality of Gacko.

== See also ==
- List of lakes in Bosnia and Herzegovina
