= Tribistovo Lake =

- Location within Bosnia and Herzegovina
- Interactive map of Tribistovo Lake
- Location: Bosnia and Herzegovina
- Coordinates: 43°31′31″N 17°20′46″E
- Type: artificial lake

Tribistovo Lake is an artificial lake of Bosnia and Herzegovina. It is located in the municipality of Posusje.

== See also ==
- List of lakes in Bosnia and Herzegovina
