= Gvozno Lake =

Lake in Bosnia and Herzegovina

- Location within Bosnia and Herzegovina
- Interactive map of Gvozno Lake
- Location: Bosnia and Herzegovina
- Coordinates: 43.556642°N 18.424634°E

Gvozno Lake is a quazi-natural lake in Bosnia and Herzegovina on the mountain Treskavica. It is located in the municipality of Kalinovik.

== See also ==
- List of lakes in Bosnia and Herzegovina
