= Drijen Vrelo =

Lake of Bosnia and Herzegovina

- Location within Bosnia and Herzegovina
- Interactive map of Drijen Vrelo
- Location: Hutovo Blato, Bosnia and Herzegovina
- Coordinates: 43°03′N 17°49′E
- Type: lake

Drijen Vrelo is a lake of Bosnia and Herzegovina. It is located in the municipality of Hutovo Blato.

It has a Köppen climate type of Cfb : Temperate oceanic climate.

== See also ==
- List of lakes of Bosnia and Herzegovina
