= Hazna Lake =

Lake in Bosnia and Herzegovina

- Location within Bosnia and Herzegovina
- Interactive map of Hazna Lake
- Location: Gradačac, Bosnia and Herzegovina
- Coordinates: 44°52′46.1″N 18°24′54.8″E
- Built: 1967

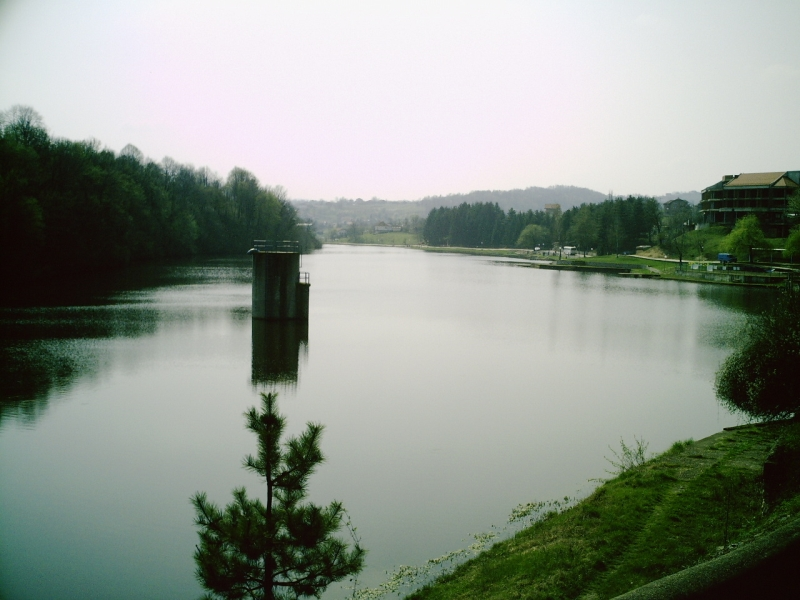
Hazna Lake, Bosnia and Herzegovina

Hazna Lake is an artificial lake in Gradačac, Bosnia and Herzegovina. It was built in 1967 after the Hazna River and the Vidara Lake flooded Gradačac in 1964 and 1967. The lake was first stocked with fish in 1967. A pontoon bridge was built a few years later. The lake was a popular attraction in Gradačac before the Bosnian War. After the war, very little care was devoted to maintaining it, and it quickly became contaminated. A few buildings surround the lake—a restaurant, a hotel still under construction, etc.

== See also ==
- List of lakes in Bosnia and Herzegovina
