= Oličko Lake =

Lake in Bosnia and Herzegovina

- Location within Bosnia and Herzegovina
- Interactive map of Oličko Lake
- Coordinates: 44°14′20″N 17°04′25″E
- Basin countries: Bosnia and Herzegovina
- Max. length: 0.25 km (0.16 mi)
- Max. width: 0.2 km (0.12 mi)
- Surface area: .04 km^{2} (0.015 sq mi)
- Max. depth: 30 m (98 ft)

Olićko Lake is a lake of Bosnia and Herzegovina, the lake is near of village Olići, in the municipality of Šipovo.

== See also ==
- List of lakes in Bosnia and Herzegovina
