= Vrtliško Lake =

- Location within Bosnia and Herzegovina
- Interactive map of Vrtliško Lake
- Location: Bosnia and Herzegovina
- Coordinates: 44°08′11″N 18°06′16″E
- Type: lake

Vrtliško Lake is a part artificial, part natural lake of Bosnia and Herzegovina. It is located in the municipality of Kakanj.

== See also ==
- List of lakes in Bosnia and Herzegovina
