= Ždrimačko Lake =

Lake in Gornji Vakuf-Uskoplje, Bosnia and Herzegovina

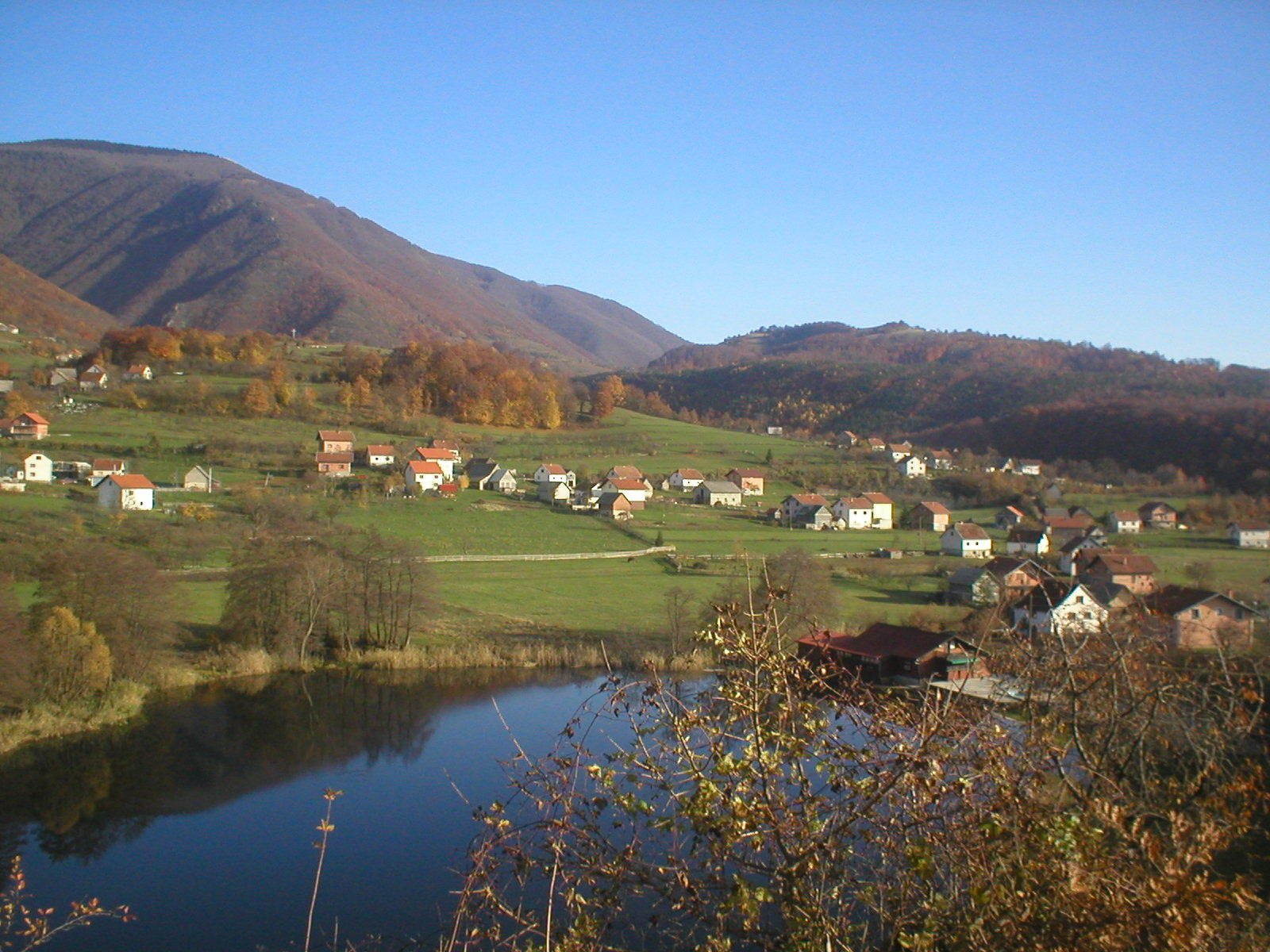

- Location within Bosnia and Herzegovina
- Interactive map of Ždrimačko Lake
- Location: Gornji Vakuf, Bosnia and Herzegovina
- Coordinates: 43°55′22″N 17°37′21″E

Ždrimačko Lake is a lake of Bosnia and Herzegovina. It is located in the municipality of Gornji Vakuf.

== See also ==
- List of lakes in Bosnia and Herzegovina
