= Bijelo Lake (Treskavica) =

- Location within Bosnia and Herzegovina
- Interactive map of Bijelo Lake
- Location: Bosnia and Herzegovina
- Coordinates: 43°35′51″N 18°21′42″E
- Type: lake

Bijelo Lake is a lake of Bosnia and Herzegovina. It is located on mountain Treskavica.

== See also ==
- List of lakes in Bosnia and Herzegovina
