= Orlovo Lake =

- Location within Bosnia and Herzegovina
- Interactive map of Orlovo Lake
- Location: Petrovo, Republika Srpska, Bosnia and Herzegovina
- Coordinates: 44°36′42″N 18°19′56″E
- Type: Reservoir

Orlovo Lake is an artificial lake in Petrovo, Republika Srpska, Bosnia and Herzegovina. It is located on Mount Ozren.

== See also ==
- List of lakes in Bosnia and Herzegovina
