= Unac (river) =

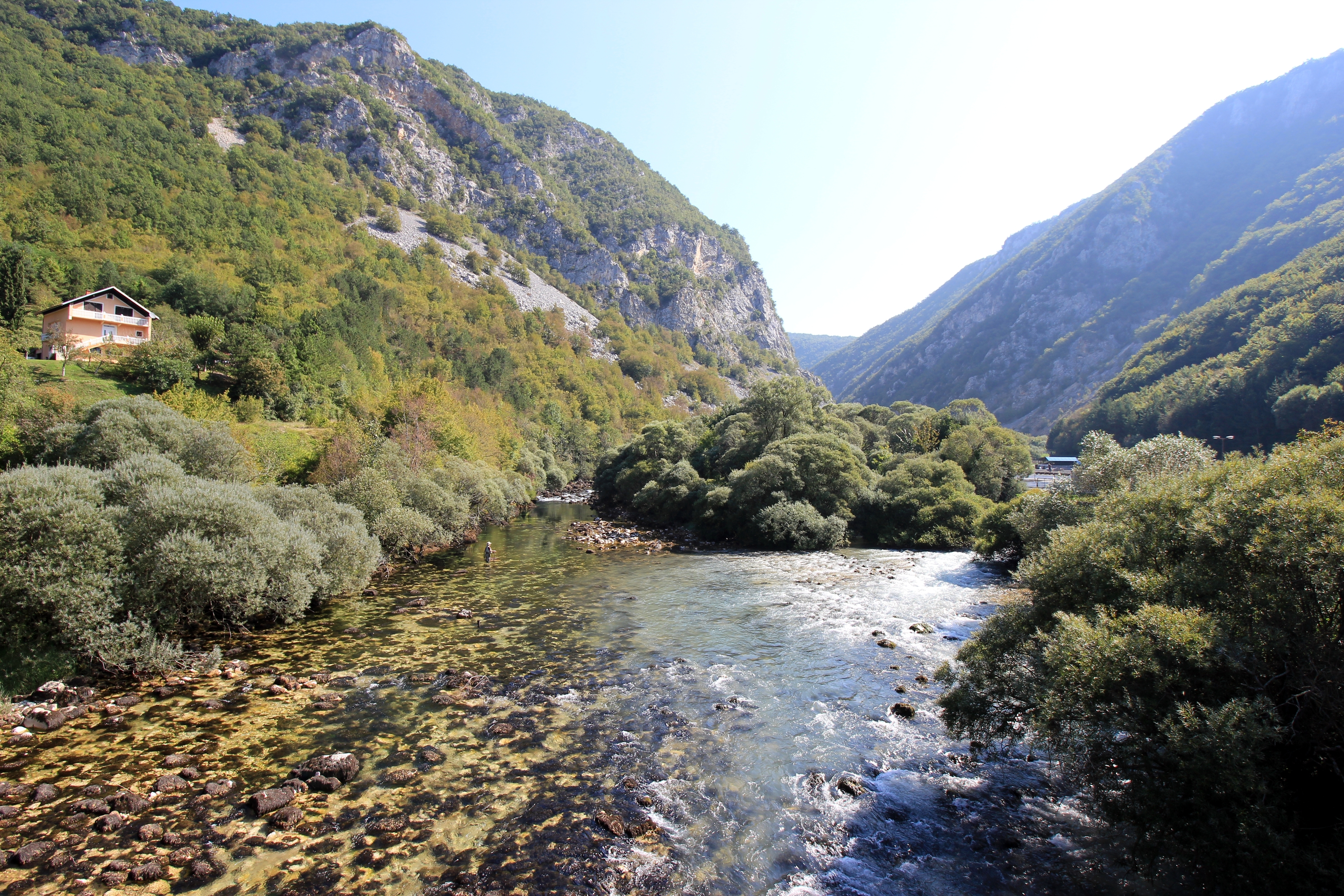

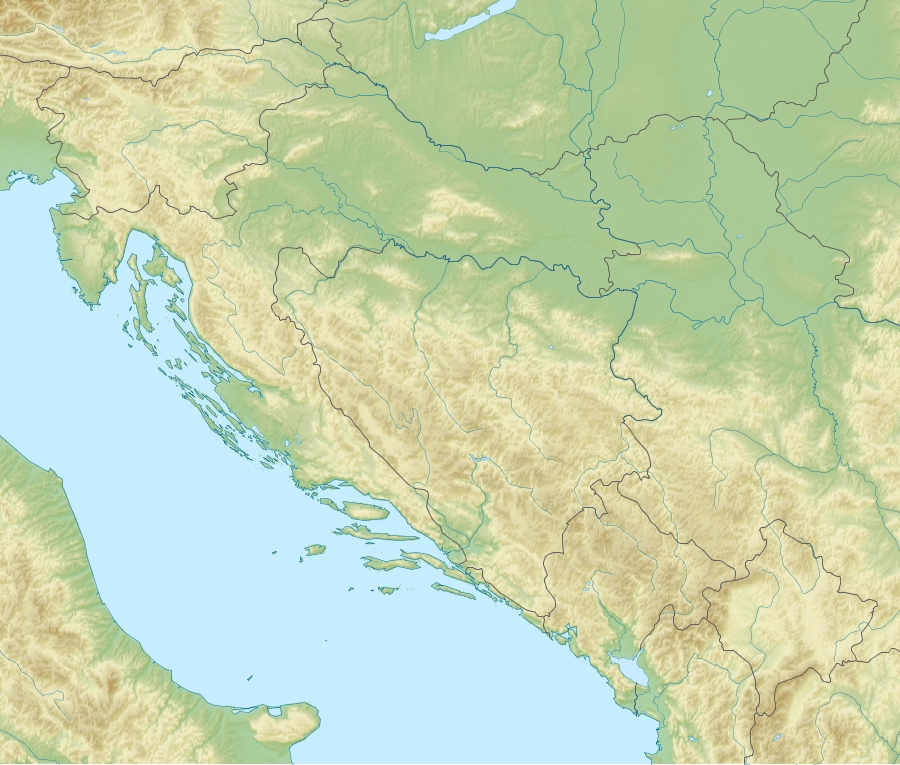
- Location within Bosnia and Herzegovina Location within Dinaric Alps

Location
- Country: Bosnia and Herzegovina

Physical characteristics
- Source
  - location: Preodac
- Mouth
  - location: Una, Martin Brod
  - coordinates: 44°29′42″N 16°08′08″E

Basin features
- Progression: Una→ Sava→ Danube→ Black Sea

The Unac (Serbian Cyrillic: Унац) is a sinking river in Bosnia and Herzegovina. It rises beneath Šator mountain, flows through the municipality of Drvar and finally meets Una River in Martin Brod. Also runs through two deep and rugged karstic canyons and it is dammed to form small Preodačko Lake and larger Župica Lake, before it reach town of Drvar.

Lower course of the Unac River and its canyon is included into the Una National Park.

The confluence of Una and Unac is the location of the medieval Rmanj Fortress, as well as the Rmanj Monastery.

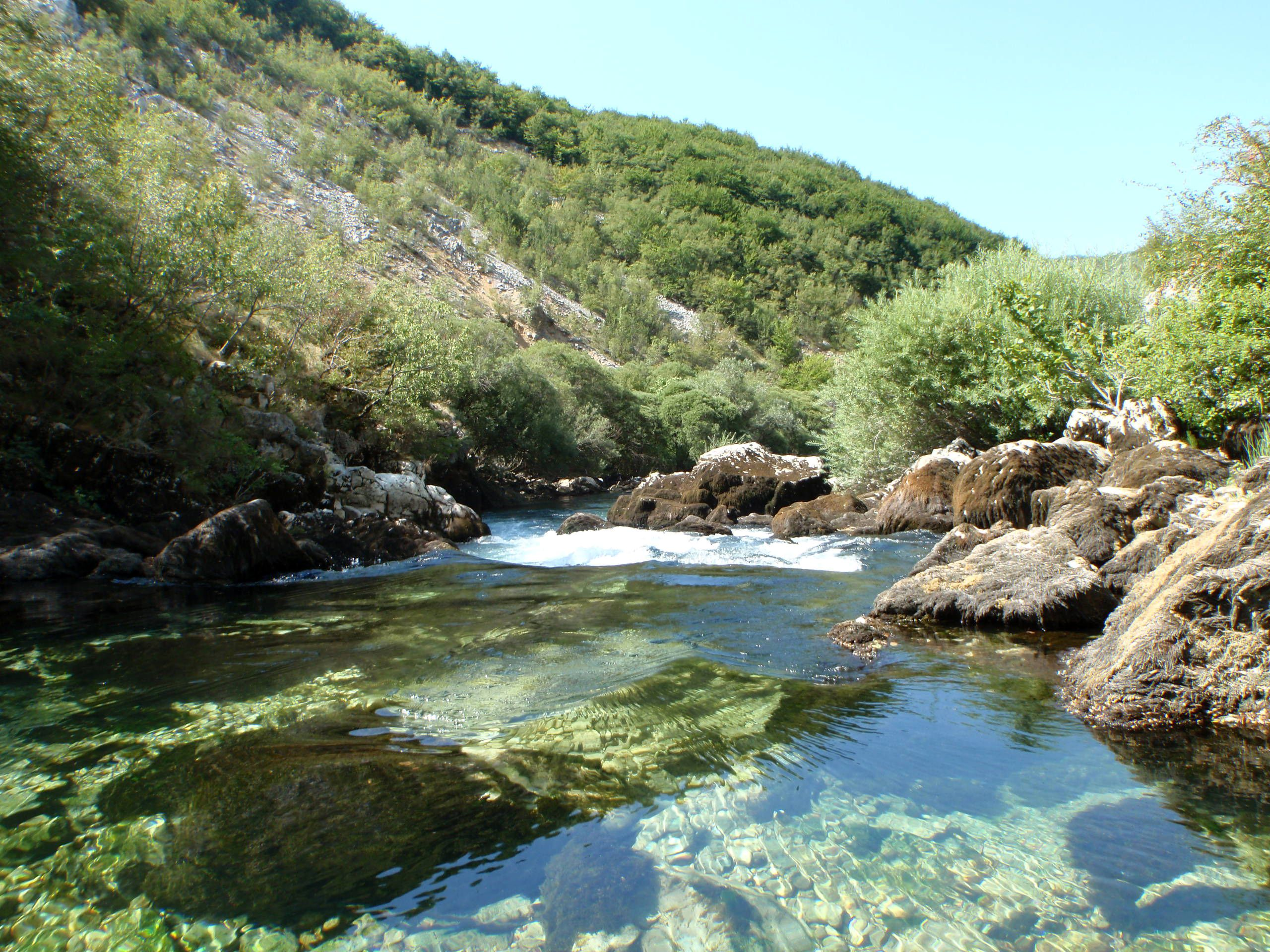
Unac leaving a canyon at Martin Brod outskirts.

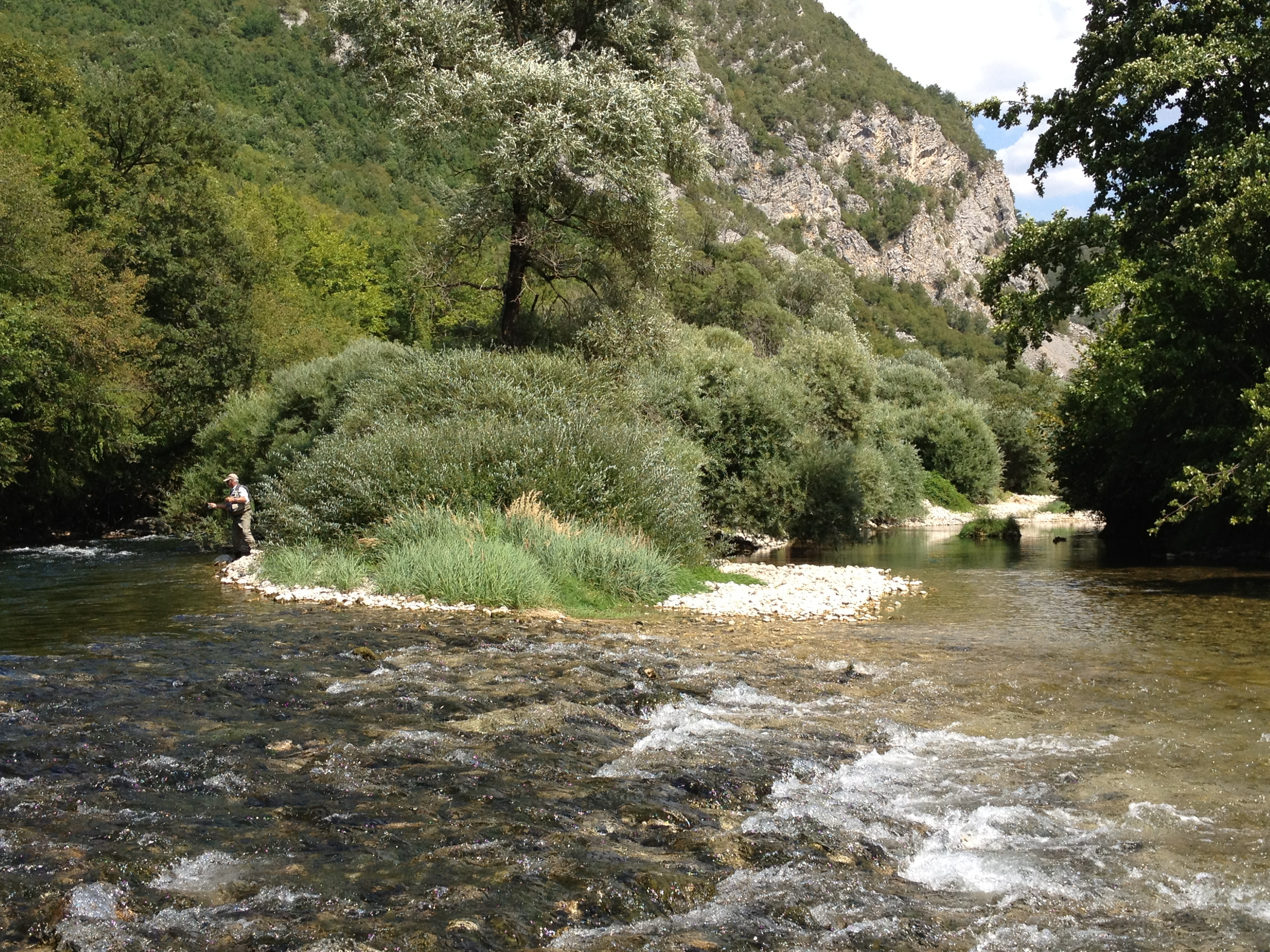
Flyfishing on the Unac at the outskirts of Martin Brod.

== See also ==
- Sinking river
