= Breštica Lake =

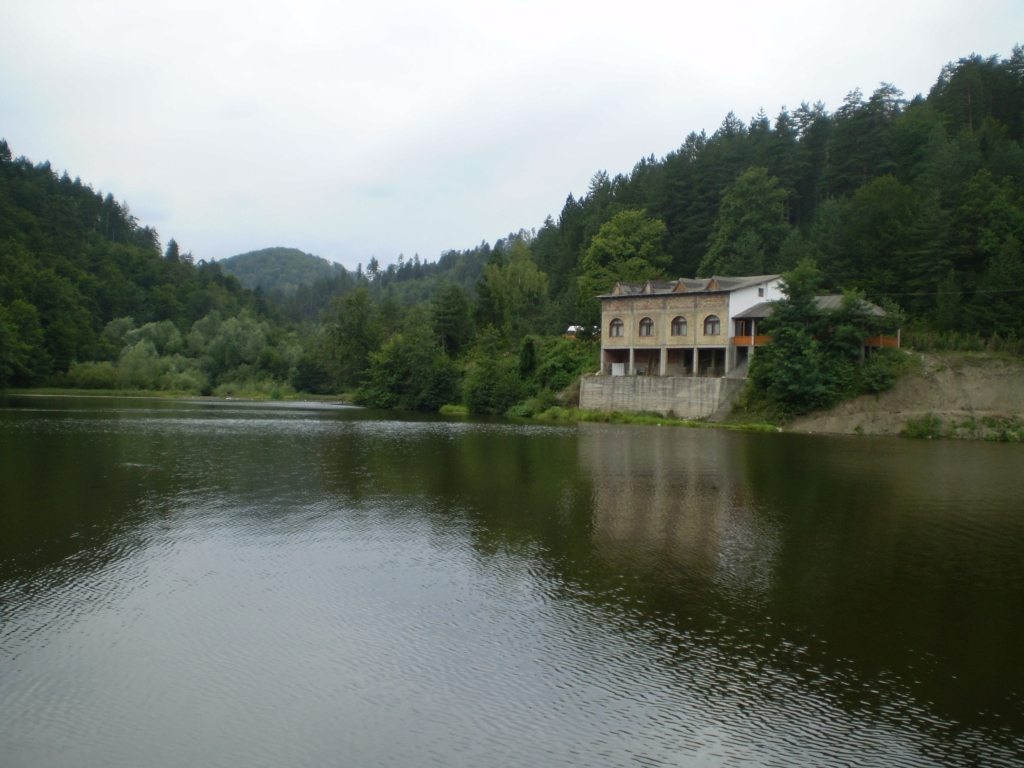

- Location within Bosnia and Herzegovina
- Interactive map of Breštica Lake
- Location: Banovići, Bosnia and Herzegovina
- Coordinates: 44°23′04″N 18°30′53″E
- Type: lake

Breštica Lake is a lake of Bosnia and Herzegovina. It is located in the municipality of Banovići.

== See also ==
- List of lakes in Bosnia and Herzegovina
