= Kukavičko Lake =

Lake in Bosnia and Herzegovina

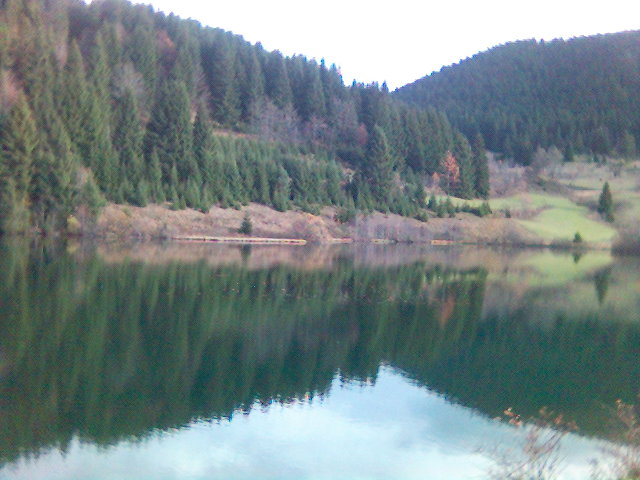

- Location within Bosnia and Herzegovina
- Interactive map of Kukavičko Lake
- Location: Kupres, Bosnia and Herzegovina
- Coordinates: 43°57′0″N 17°19′54.01″E

Kukavičko Lake (Bosnian: Kukavičko jezero) is a lake of Bosnia and Herzegovina. It is located in the municipality of Kupres.

== See also ==
- List of lakes in Bosnia and Herzegovina
