= Višegradsko Lake =

- Location within Bosnia and Herzegovina
- Interactive map of Višegradsko Lake
- Location: Republika Srpska, Bosnia and Herzegovina
- Coordinates: 43°45′31″N 19°16′55″E
- Type: lake

Višegradsko Lake is a lake of Republika Srpska, Bosnia and Herzegovina. It is located in the municipality of Visegrad.

== See also ==
- List of lakes in Bosnia and Herzegovina
