= Uloško Lake =

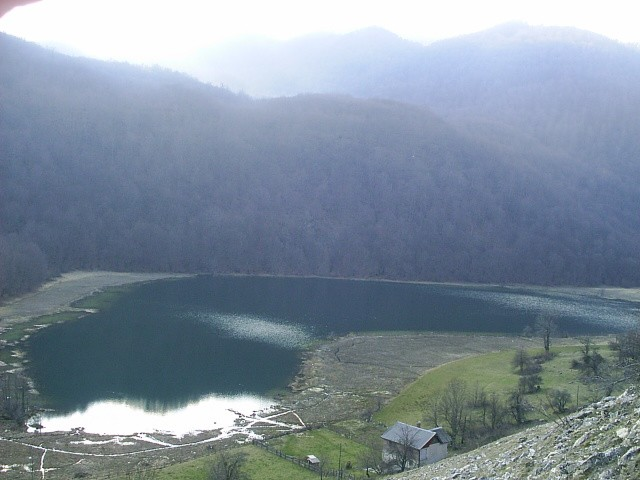
- Uloško Lake

- Location within Bosnia and Herzegovina
- Interactive map of Uloško Lake
- Location: Bosnia and Herzegovina
- Coordinates: 43.40439417281648°N 18.24691877907637°E
- Type: lake

Uloško Lake is a lake of Bosnia and Herzegovina. It is located in the municipality of Kalinovik.

== See also ==
- List of lakes in Bosnia and Herzegovina
