= Župica Lake =

- Location within Bosnia and Herzegovina
- Interactive map of Župica Lake
- Location: Bosnia and Herzegovina
- Coordinates: 44°18′1.008″N 16°31′9.984″E
- Type: Artificial lake
- Etymology: Župica village
- Primary inflows: Unac River
- Primary outflows: Unac River
- Catchment area: Black Sea
- Built: after 1950
- Water volume: 127,777 square metres (1,375,380 ft^{2})

Župica Lake (Serbian: Жупица језеро, romanized: Župica jezero) is an artificial lake of Bosnia and Herzegovina on the Unac River. The Unac River rises beneath Šator mountain, flows through the municipality of Drvar and finally meets Una River in Martin Brod. It's dammed to form small Preodačko Lake and a few kilometers downstream larger Župica Lake (a.k.a. Prekajsko Lake), before it reach town of Drvar in the municipality of Drvar.

The lake is located upstream from Drvar. Župica Dam is 24.75 metres high, with a curtain length of 692 metres and a surface volume of 127,777 square metres.

== See also ==
- List of lakes in Bosnia and Herzegovina
