= Hrast Lake =

Lake in Glamoč, Bosnia and Herzegovina

Hrast
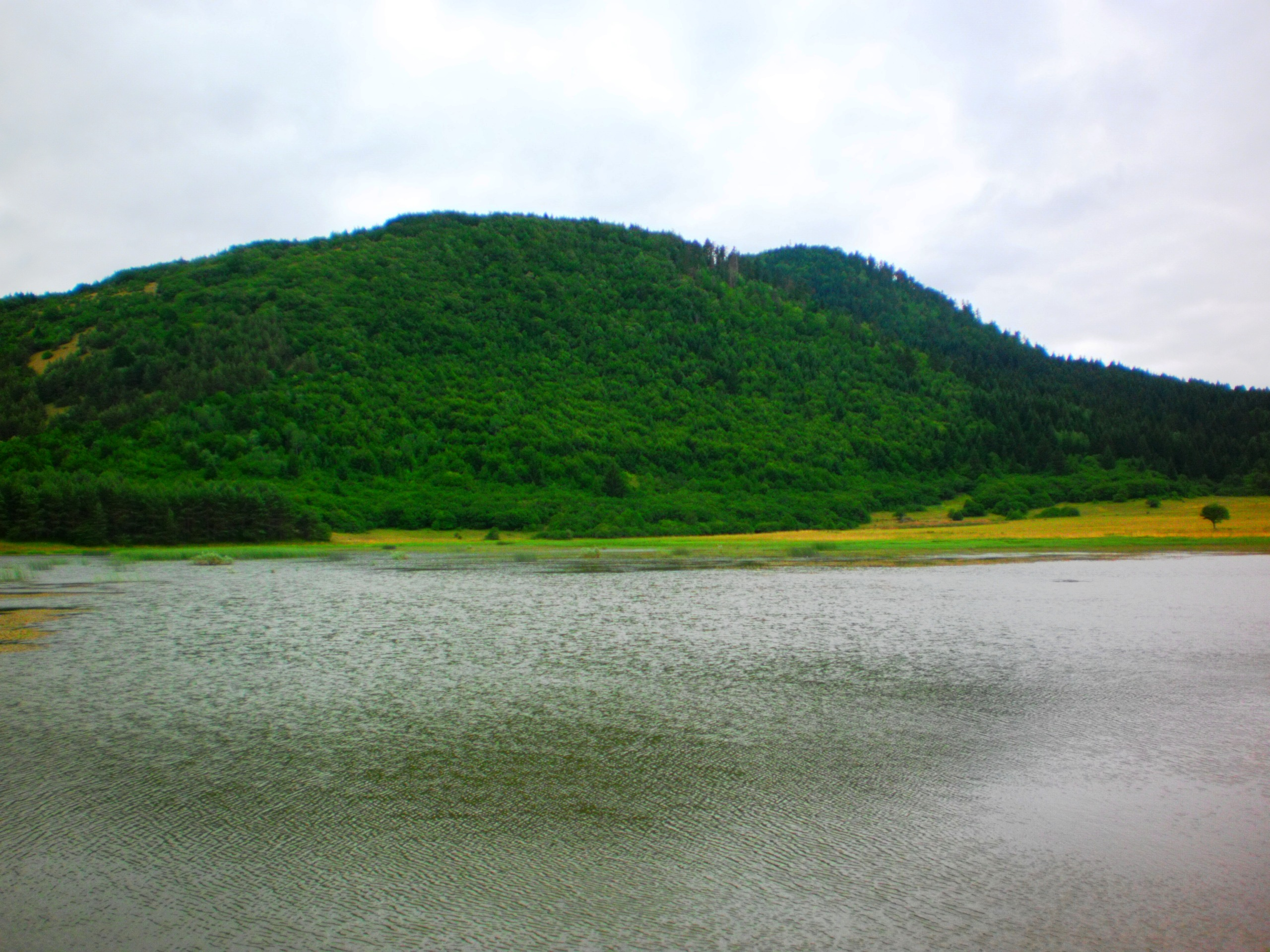

- Location within Bosnia and Herzegovina
- Interactive map of Hrast
- Location: Glamoč, Bosnia and Herzegovina
- Coordinates: 44°02′00″N 16°52′25″E
- Max. length: 627.8 m (2,060 ft)
- Max. width: 475.3 m (1,559 ft)
- Surface area: 2.5 ha (6.2 acres)

Hrast Lake is a lake of Bosnia and Herzegovina. It is located in the municipality of Glamoč.

== See also ==
- List of lakes in Bosnia and Herzegovina
