= Bistarac Lake =

Lake of Bosnia and Herzegovina

- Location within Bosnia and Herzegovina
- Interactive map of Bistarac Lake
- Location: Lukavac, Bosnia and Herzegovina
- Coordinates: 44°32′01″N 18°33′06″E

Bistarac Lake is a lake of Bosnia and Herzegovina. It is located in the municipality of Lukavac.

== See also ==
- List of lakes in Bosnia and Herzegovina
