= Bukvensko Lake =

Lake in Bosnia and Herzegovina

- Location within Bosnia and Herzegovina
- Interactive map of Bukvensko Lake
- Location: Glamoč, Canton 10, Bosnia and Herzegovina
- Coordinates: 43.901°N 16.970°E
- Surface elevation: 880 m (2,890 ft)

Bukvensko Lake (Bosnian: Bukvensko jezero) is a lake of Bosnia and Herzegovina.

== See also ==
- List of lakes in Bosnia and Herzegovina
