= Krenica Lake =

Lake in Bosnia and Herzegovina

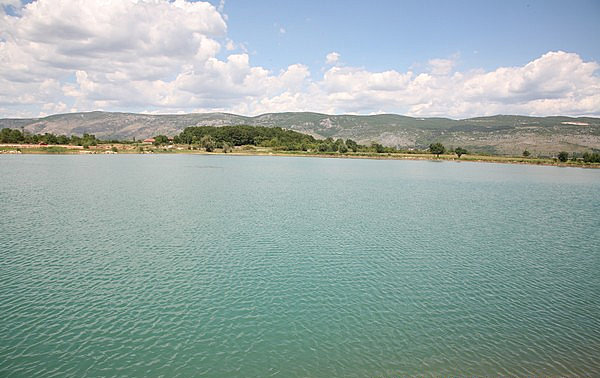

- Location within Bosnia and Herzegovina
- Location: Grude, West Herzegovina Canton, Bosnia and Herzegovina
- Coordinates: 43°22′30″N 17°19′58″E
- Average depth: 47 metres (154 ft)
- Residence time: constant
- Salinity: no

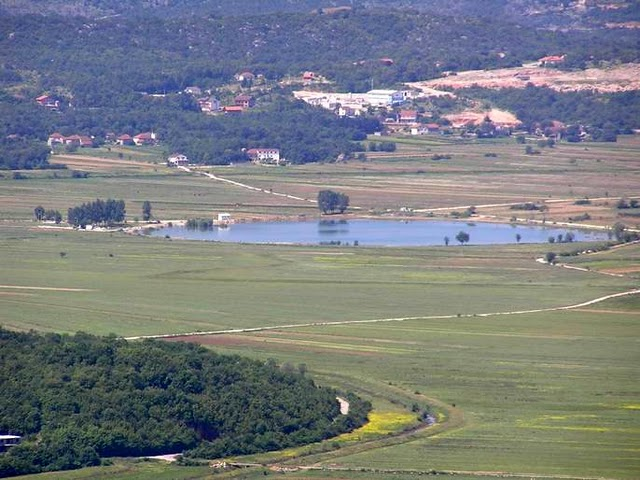
Lake Krenica aerial view

Krenica Lake is a lake of Bosnia and Herzegovina locally known for its beauty.

According to a legend, it came into being in the same time as Red Lake and Blue Lake of Imotski, when God sank all property of a greedy rich man Gavan.

== See also ==
- List of lakes in Bosnia and Herzegovina
