= Jelim Lake =

- Location within Bosnia and Herzegovina
- Location: Bosnia and Herzegovina
- Coordinates: 43.0647°N 17.8019°E
- Type: lake

Jelim Lake is a lake of Bosnia and Herzegovina. It is located next to the much larger Deransko Lake, within the Hutovo Blato nature reserve. All of the lakes within the nature reserve are connected via canals and gorges.

== See also ==
- List of lakes in Bosnia and Herzegovina
