= Busija Lake =

- Location within Bosnia and Herzegovina
- Interactive map of Busija Lake
- Coordinates: 44.0286°N 16.8494°E
- Type: reservoir
- Primary inflows: Busija River
- Primary outflows: Busija River
- Basin countries: Bosnia and Herzegovina
- Max. length: 325 metres (1,066 ft)
- Max. width: 110 metres (360 ft)

Busija Lake is a lake in Bosnia and Herzegovina. It is located in the municipality of Glamoč.

== See also ==
- List of lakes in Bosnia and Herzegovina
