= Grajseljići Lake =

Coordinates: 43.4885°N 18.4084°E

- Location within Bosnia and Herzegovina
- Interactive map of Grajseljići Lake
- Location: municipality Ulog
- Type: Reservoir
- Primary inflows: Graiseljicka rijeka
- Primary outflows: Graiseljicka rijeka
- Basin countries: Bosnia and Herzegovina
- Max. length: 55 metres (180 ft)
- Max. width: 55 metres (180 ft)

Grajseljići Lake is a lake of Bosnia and Herzegovina. It is located in the municipality of Ulog.

== See also ==
- List of lakes in Bosnia and Herzegovina
