= Nuga Lake =

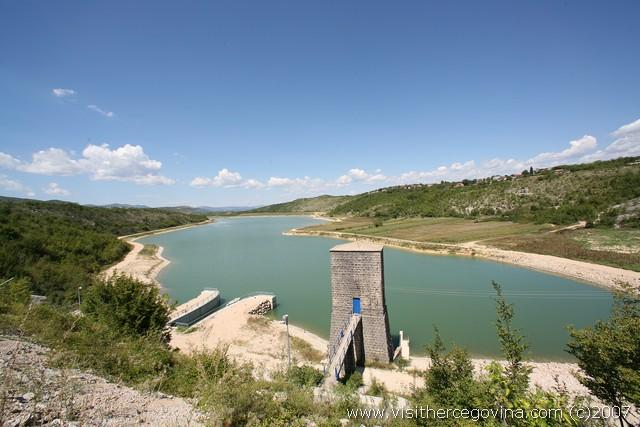

- Location within Bosnia and Herzegovina
- Interactive map of Nuga Lake
- Location: Bosnia and Herzegovina
- Coordinates: 43°21′25″N 17°18′45″E
- Type: artificial lake

Nuga Lake is an artificial lake of Bosnia and Herzegovina. It is located in the municipality of Grude.

== See also ==
- List of lakes in Bosnia and Herzegovina
