= Jugovo Lake =

Artificial lake Zelengora, Bosnia and Herzegovina

- Borilovačko Lake
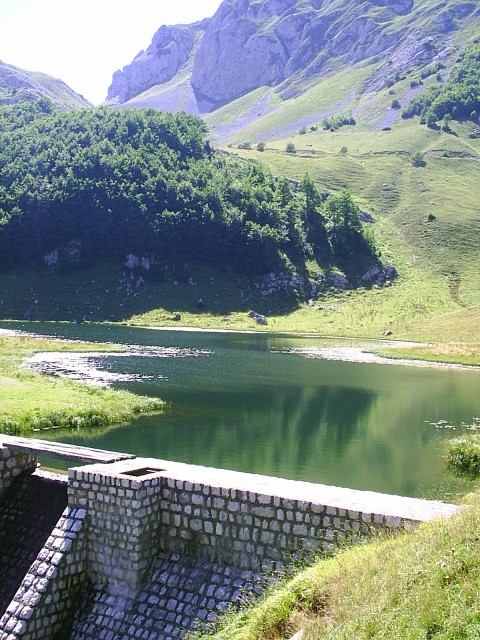

- Location within Bosnia and Herzegovina
- Interactive map of Jugovo Lake
- Location: Republika Srpska, Bosnia and Herzegovina
- Coordinates: 43°22′22″N 18°32′03″E
- Type: lake
- Max. length: 250 metres (820 ft)
- Max. width: 100 metres (330 ft)

Jugovo Lake (Serbian: Југово jезеро, romanized: Jugovo jezero), also known as Borilovačko Lake (Serbian: Бориловачко jезеро, romanized: Borilovačko jezero) is a lake of Republika Srpska, Bosnia and Herzegovina. It is located in the municipality of Zelengora. The lake is about 250 metres (820 ft) long and 100 metres (330 ft) wide and contains Californian Trout.

== See also ==
- List of lakes in Bosnia and Herzegovina
