= Alagovac Lake =

Artificial lake in Nevesinje, Bosnia and Herzegovina

- Location within Bosnia and Herzegovina
- Interactive map of Alagovac Lake
- Location: Nevesinje, Bosnia and Herzegovina
- Coordinates: 43°17′32″N 18°06′23″E
- Type: Lake
- Surface area: 40 hectares (99 acres)

Alagovac Lake is a lake in the municipality of Nevesinje, Bosnia and Herzegovina. It covers an area of 40 hectares (99 acres).
