= Rmanj Fortress =

- Martin Brod, Bosnia
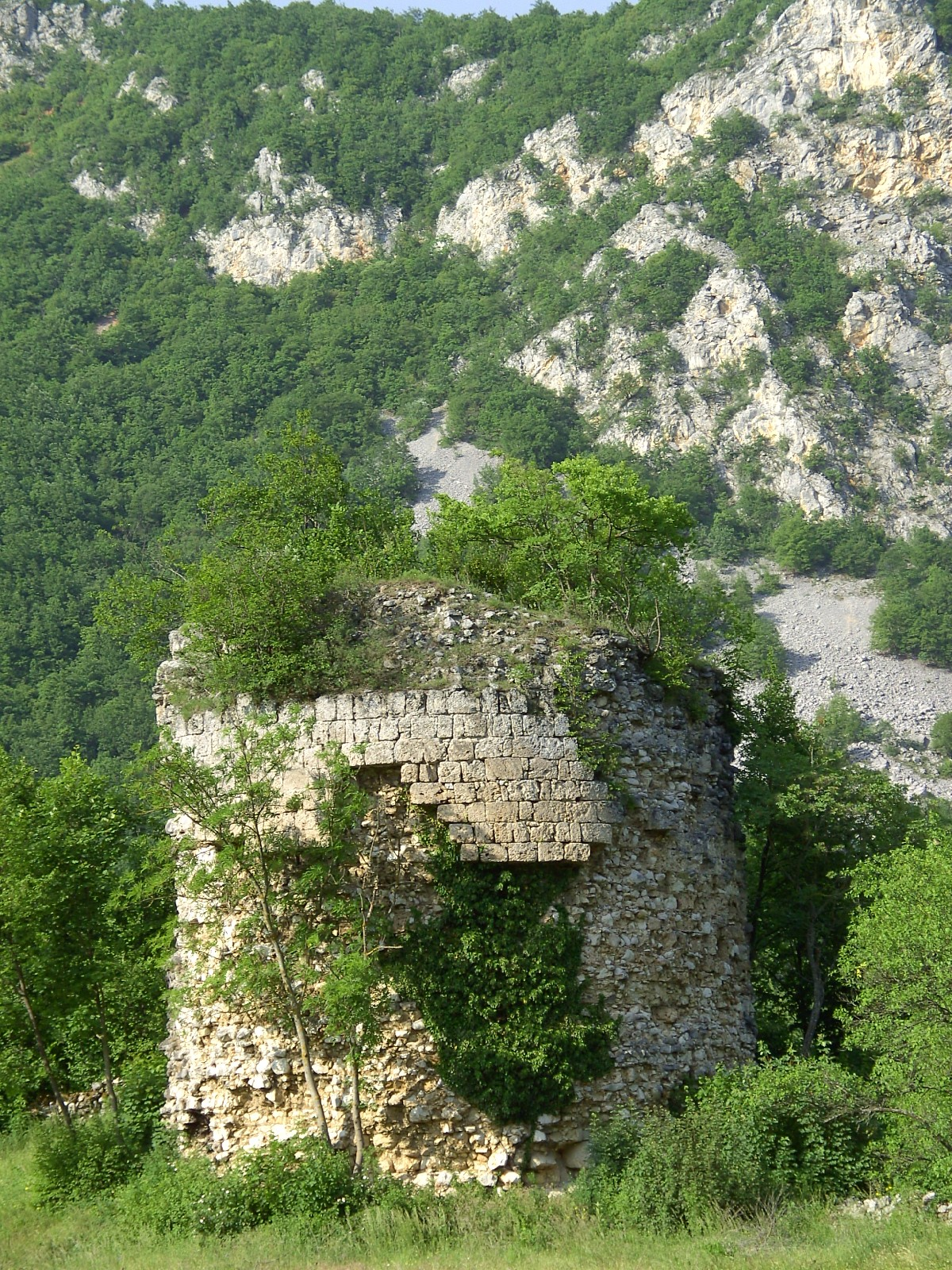

Site information
- Type: fortress

Location
- Coordinates: 44.4907°N 16.1415°E

Site history
- Built for: Kingdom of Hungary, Ottoman Empire
- In use: 14th-15th century

Garrison information
- Designations

KONS of Bosnia and Herzegovina
- Official name: Stari grad Rmanj u Martin-Brodu
- Type: historic urban site
- Criteria: II. Value; A, B, C i.iii.iv., D i.ii.iv., E i.iii.v.
- Designated: February 2, 2016 (?th session)
- Reference no.: 7057
- Decision no.: 06.2-2.3-58/16-7
- State: National Monuments of Bosnia and Herzegovina

Rmanj is a fortress located near the village of Martin Brod, Bosnia and Herzegovina, originating in the Middle Ages.

Unlike other forts in the Una river valley, Rmanj is located in a flatland, at the confluence of the Unac into the Una. It is believed to have been built in the 14th or the 15th century, and was taken by the Ottoman Empire in 1524. The only preserved part of the fortification is the circular tower.

It is believed to be located in the place of an early medieval castrum of Ermin or Ermen, also referred to in sources as Herman, Hermanj, Ermain, and Sermil, and the earliest mention of this was 1431. There was also a toponym of Conuba or Konoba in use for an unknown place nearby, first in 1396, which may have been the same town or a reference to the nearby Rmanj Monastery. The fortification was owned by the House of Celje and the House of Frankopan.

The site was declared a national monument in 2016.

== Sources ==
- Commission to Preserve National Monuments of Bosnia and Herzegovina (2016). "Odluka – Historijska građevina – Stari grad Rmanj u Martin-Brodu, općina Bihać" [Decision – The historic building – Old Fort of Rmanj in Martin-Brod, Bihać Municipality]. Official Gazette of Bosnia and Herzegovina (in Croatian) (80/16).
- Commission to Preserve National Monuments of Bosnia and Herzegovina (2016). "Odluka – Historijska građevina – Stari grad Rmanj u Martin-Brodu, općina Bihać" [Decision – The historic building – Old Fort of Rmanj in Martin-Brod, Bihać Municipality] (in Croatian). Commission to Preserve National Monuments of Bosnia and Herzegovina.
- Klaić, Vjekoslav (1904). "Građa za topografiju ličko-krbavske županije u srednjem vijeku". Journal of the Archaeological Museum in Zagreb (in Croatian). 1 (1).
