= Gornje Bare =

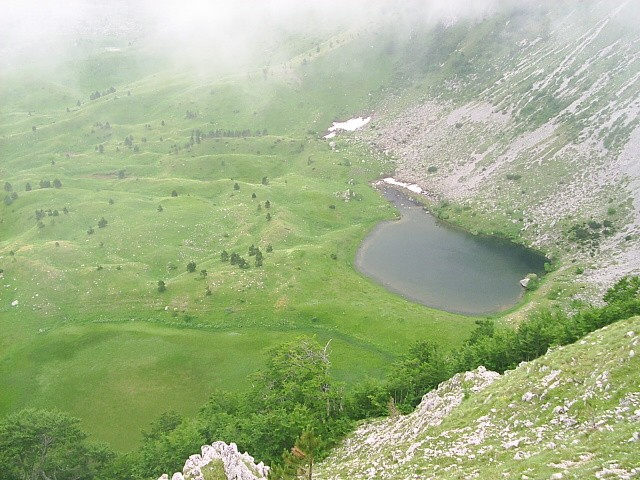
- Gornje Bare

- Location within Bosnia and Herzegovina
- Interactive map of Gornje Bare
- Location: Republika Srpska, Bosnia and Herzegovina
- Coordinates: 43°19′N 18°36′E
- Type: lake

Gornje Bare (Serbian Cyrillic: Горње Баре) is a lake of Republika Srpska, Bosnia and Herzegovina. It is located in the municipality of Zelengora.

== See also ==
- List of lakes of Bosnia and Herzegovina
