= Rmanj Monastery =

Serbian Orthodox monastery in Martin Brod, Bosnia and Herzegovina

Rmanj
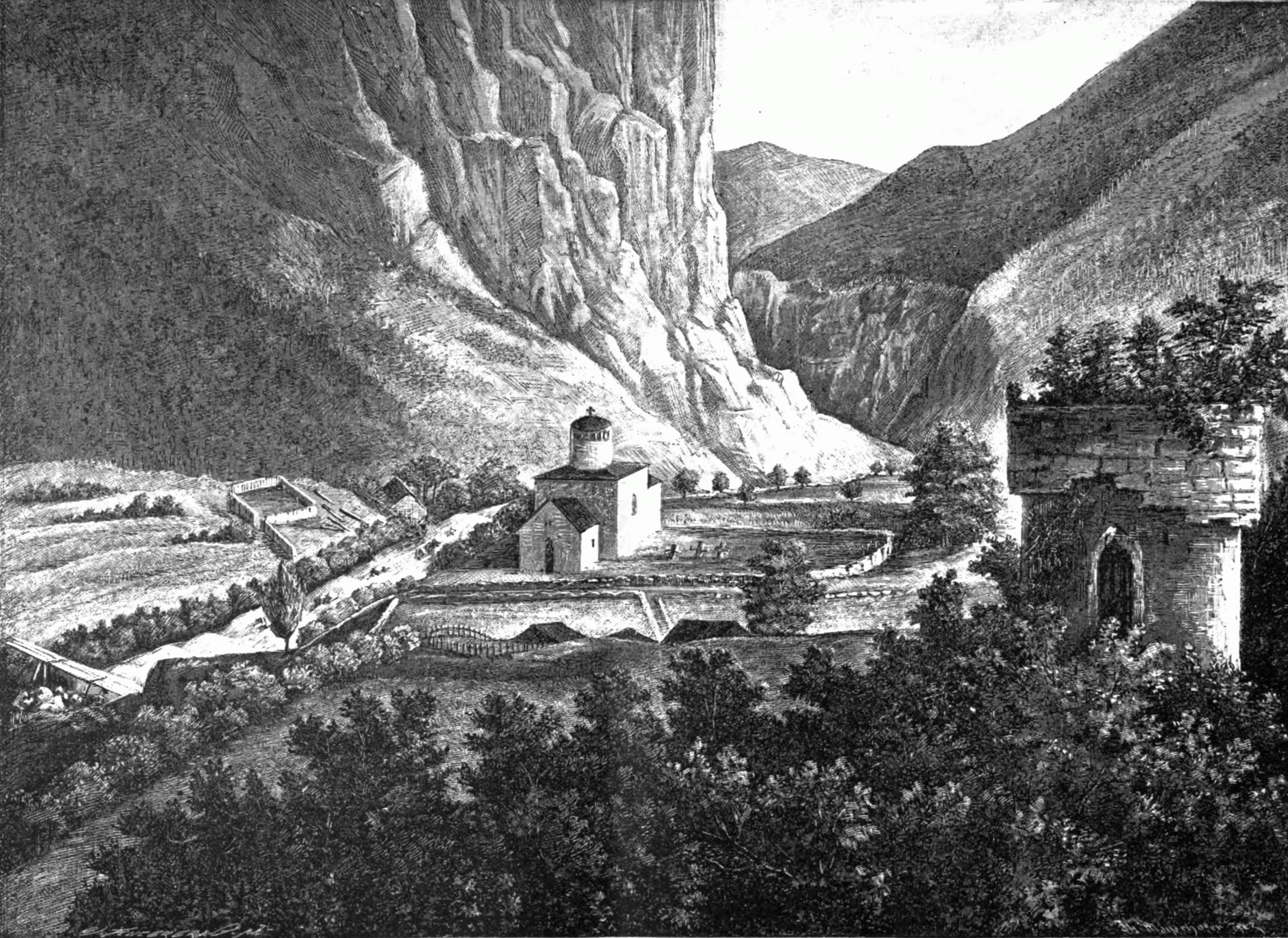
- Rmanj in Bosnia in 1884
- Interactive map of Rmanj

Monastery information
- Full name: Monastery of the Saint Nicholas in Martin Brod
- Denomination: Eastern Orthodox
- Established: late 15th early 16th c.
- Diocese: Eparchy of Bihać and Petrovac

Architecture
- Heritage designation

KONS of Bosnia and Herzegovina
- Official name: Serbian Orthodox monastery of Rmanj with the remains of original frescoes in Martin Brod, the historic building of the site and remains of the architectural ensemble
- Type: Category I cultural and historical property
- Criteria: A, B, C i.ii.iii.iv.v.vi, D i.ii.iii.iv.v, E i.ii.iii.iv.v,, F.iii., G i.ii.iii.iv.
- Designated: 7 March 2007
- Part of: List of National Monuments of Bosnia and Herzegovina
- Reference no.: 2917
- Decision No.: 06.1-2-186/05-25
- Designated date: 7 March 2007

Site
- Location: Martin Brod
- Country: Bosnia and Herzegovina
- Coordinates: 44.492757°N 16.143304°E
- Website: www

The Rmanj Monastery (Serbian: Манастир Рмањ, romanized: Manastir Rmanj) is a Serbian Orthodox monastery dedicated to Saint Nicholas and located in Martin Brod in north-western Bosnia and Herzegovina, at the left bank of the Unac River near its confluence with the Una. The original monastery is dated to the late 15th or early 16th century, after which it underwent several disasters and having to be rebuilt.

== History ==
The exact year of the monastery establishment cannot be determined, although it was the westernmost Serbian Orthodox monastery at the end of the 16th century.

The earliest mention of the Rmanj locality as the capital town of Lapčani tribe, probably referring to the Rmanj Fortress, is from several charters and letters dating from 1448, 1451, and 1478 respectively.

The earliest written evidence with a reference to the Rmanj Monastery dates back to 1498. That's the record of Vojvodas Petar and Vukodrag Petrašanin paying for an icon of the Virgin and Christ to be painted for the monastery; another also from late 15th c. is in the Kruševo memorial book.

After the conquest of this area by the Ottoman Empire, the monastery was temporarily abandoned in 1578. Bosnian Beylerbey Telli Hasan Pasha had the Rmanj Monastery renewed as a seat of his brother, Orthodox monk Gavrilo Predojević.

Rmanj was the seat of the Metropolitanate of Dabro Bosnia in the second half of the 16th and the first half of the 17th century. It remained in that capacity for about 110 years. During that time, ten metropolitans served in it.

The Ottomans burned down the monastery in 1663, but it was later rebuilt and occupied again in 1737. It was burned again during the Austro-Turkish War of 1787–1791. The Ottoman authorities allowed the rebuilding of the monastery in 1863, and it was rebuilt in two years.

It was badly damaged during the anti-Ottoman uprising in Bosnia in 1875 and 1876. The following year, Arthur Evans visited Rmanj (which he wrote as "Ermanja") and in one of his letters described the damage done to the monastery church by troops under the leadership of a Bosnian Muslim feudal lord.

The monastery was repaired again in 1883.

In World War II, a field hospital of the Yugoslav Partisans was organized at the monastery. For this reason, it was bombed by the Germans and completely destroyed on 23 April 1944.

In 1974, authorities of the Socialist Yugoslavia allowed the renovation of the monastery. Its church was completed in the 1980s, and the foundation of the monks' dormitory was consecrated in 1993.

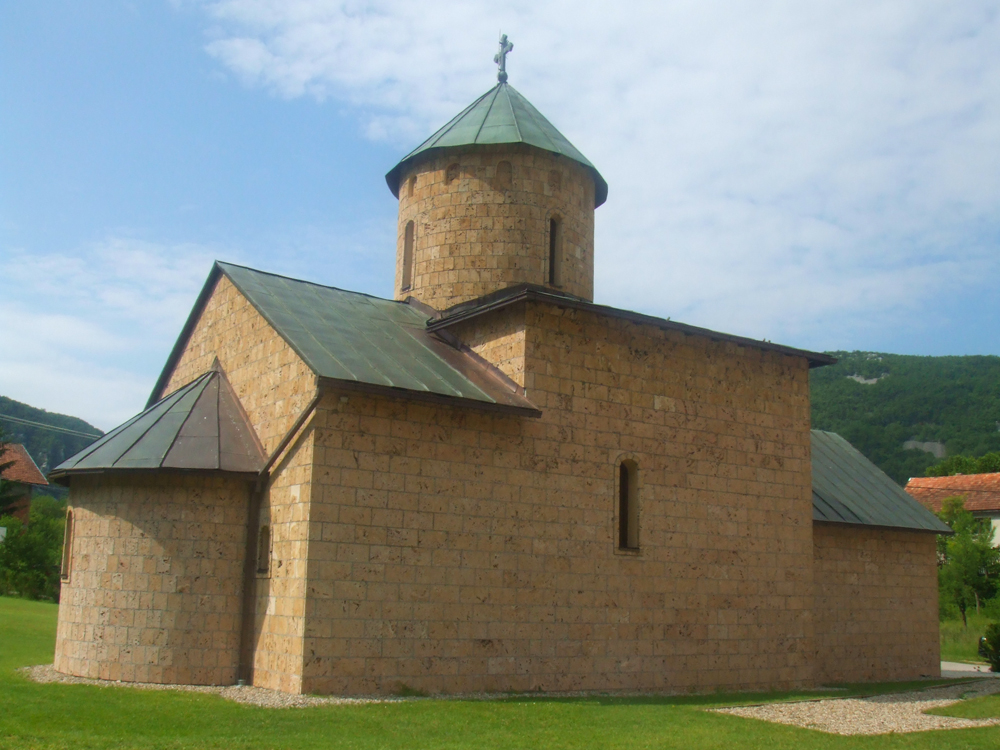
Renovated church of the Rmanj Monastery

In 1995, during the Croatian Army's Operation Storm, the monastery was shelled and badly damaged. Afterwards, Croatian soldiers mined the monastery's church, but the mines were removed by British soldiers of the SFOR. The dormitory is completed in 2006, and in the following year, three monks inhabit it.

In 2007, the Rmanj Monastery is declared a National Monument of Bosnia and Herzegovina by KONS.

== See also ==
- List of Serbian Orthodox monasteries

== Bibliography ==
- Ćirković, Sima (2004). The Serbs. Malden: Blackwell Publishing. ISBN 0631204717.
