= Donje Bare =

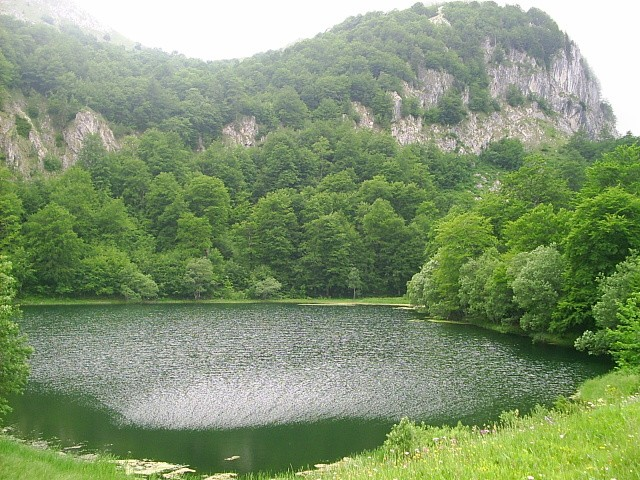
- Donje Bare

- Location within Bosnia and Herzegovina
- Interactive map of Donje Bare
- Location: Zelengora, Bosnia and Herzegovina
- Coordinates: 43°19′05″N 18°37′51″E
- Type: Lake
- Max. length: 250 metres (820 ft)
- Max. width: 120 metres (390 ft)
- Max. depth: 4.5 metres (14 ft 9 in)

Donje Bare (Serbian Cyrillic: Доње Баре) is a natural lake in Bosnia and Herzegovina, on the mountain Zelengora. It is located below the Ardov peak (1723). It is 250 metres (820 ft) long and 120 metres (390 ft) wide. The greatest depth of the lake is 4.5 metres (14 ft 9 in).

During the winter, the lake is completely ice-bound. Rainbow trout is an invasive species that lives the lake. The water is clean and clear. It is filled with sources springing on the west coast. The bottom is dark blue. Around the lake are meadows and forests, a landscape of alpine pastures, covered with mountain grass, interspersed with scrub and pine trees, and in lower areas of beech.

== See also ==
- List of lakes of Bosnia and Herzegovina
