= 9th Division (Yugoslav Partisans) =

9th Dalmatia Division
- Flag of the Federal State of Croatia, used by Croatian Partisans
- Active: 1943–1945
- Country: Democratic Federal Yugoslavia
- Branch: Yugoslav Partisan Army
- Type: Infantry
- Size: ~3,300 (October 1943)
- Part of: 4th Army
- Engagements: World War II in Yugoslavia

Commanders
- Notable commanders: Ante Banina

The 9th Dalmatia Division (Serbo-Croatian Latin: Deveta dalmatinska divizija) was a Yugoslav Partisan division formed in Imotski on 13 February 1943. Upon formation it was composed of the 3rd, the 4th and the 5th Dalmatia Brigades. The division fought NDH, Germany, Italy and Chetniks in various operations conducted by the Partisans, it played a key role in the Trieste operation. It was commanded by Ante Banina and its political commissar was Eduard Santini.
