= Šator =

Mountain in Bosnia and Herzegovina

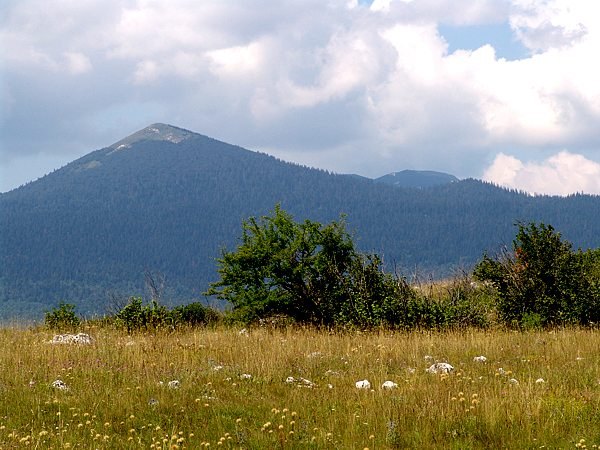
- Šator

Highest point
- Elevation: 1,872 m (6,142 ft)
- Coordinates: 44°9′22″N 16°35′22″E

Geography
- Location within Bosnia and Herzegovina
- Location: Bosnia and Herzegovina
- Parent range: Dinaric Alps

Šator (Serbian Cyrillic: Шатор) is a mountain in the Dinaric Alps, in the western regions of Bosnia and Herzegovina. The name šator means "tent". The highest peak Veliki Šator is 1,872 m (6,142 ft) above sea level. Dimensions of the mountain are some 15 km (9 miles) in the west–east and 10 km (6 miles) in the north–south direction.

The mountain area includes a lake, rich flora and fauna, numerous geomorphological and hydrological phenomena, as well as the aesthetic appearance in general.

== Geography ==
Šator rises some 1000 meters above high plains and surrounding karstic fields. These plains are among highest and most spacious karstic fields in the Dinaric Alps and in Bosnia and Herzegovina.

On the south is Livanjsko Polje field located some 700 m (2,297 ft) above sea level, which is over 50 km (31 mi) long. Šator rises from its north - north-west end.

In the opposite direction, south - south-east, are Mount Staretina, peaking at 1,675 m (5,495 ft) above sea level, and Mountain Golija, 1,890 m (6,201 ft) above sea level. These mountains divide the Livanjsko field from the Glamočko Polje field.

To the east is a huge grassy plain, which is around 1,000 m (3,281 ft) above sea level. To the north is deep valley where the Unac River emerge and Župica Lake. On the north-west is an 1,100-metre-high (3,609 ft) grassy plateau, and a 1,656-metre-high (5,433 ft) mountain of Jadovnik.

The spacious and grassy Grahovsko Polje field is on the west, with an altitude above sea level of around 900 m (2,953 ft) meters. At the middle of the Grahovsko field is a small town of Bosansko Grahovo at an altitude around 861 m (2,825 ft) above sea level, a place which is a main approach to Šator. This whole area is bounded with a long mountain chain, which includes the peaks of Dinara on the border with Croatia.

== Peaks ==
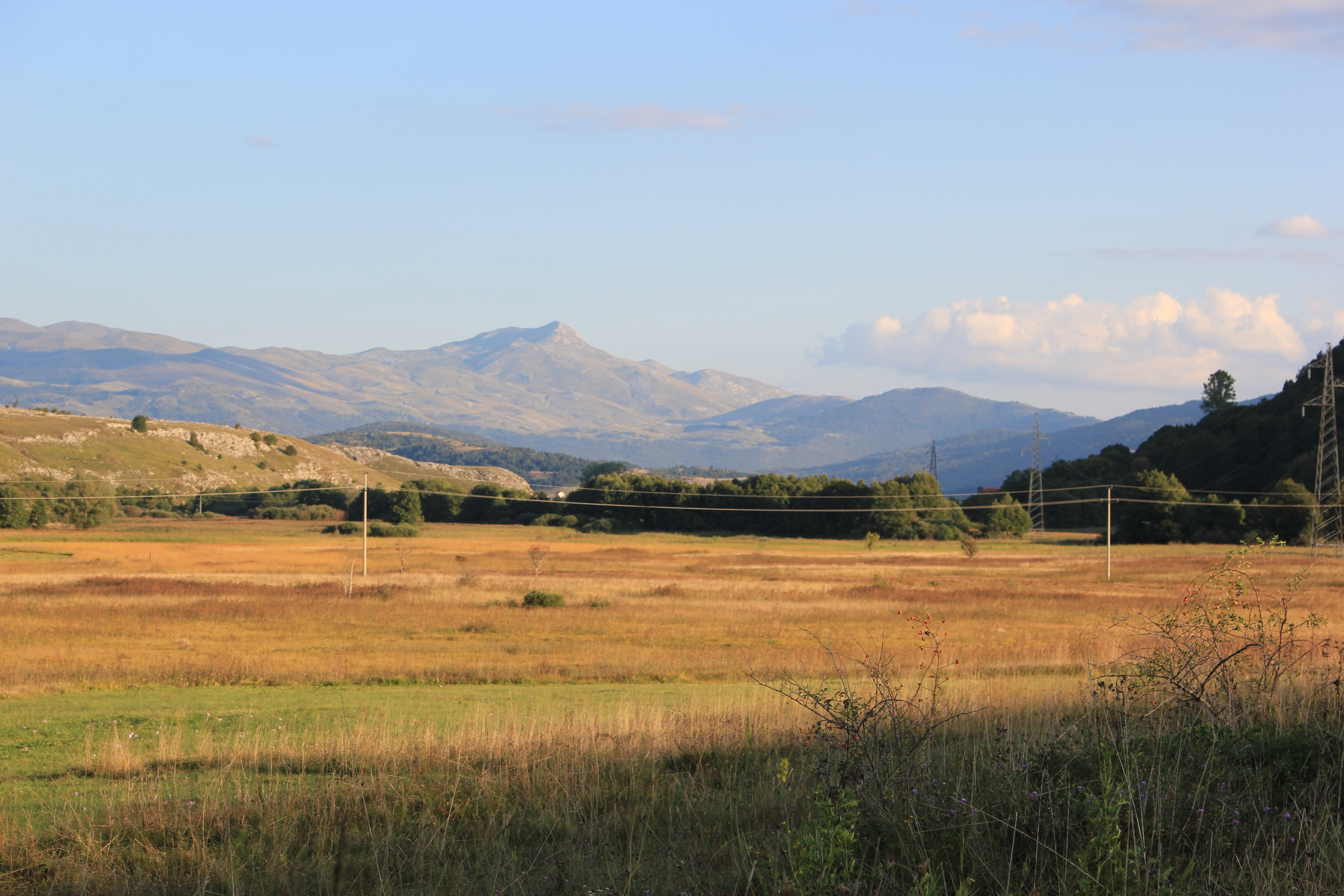
Šator as seen from Grahovsko polje

Šator peaks start rising with a sort of plateau 1,500 m (4,921 ft) meters above sea level, at the end of the dense forests of beech, fir and spruce. Those 5 peaks have a shape like tent and form a 10-kilometre-long (6 mi) string in east–west direction. That is almost perpendicular to most of Dinaric Alps mountains, which stretch in southeast–northwest direction.

From a distance the whole mountain gives the impression of tent and that is how it got its name (Bosnian: šator = English: tent). The highest peak, on the western end, is Veliki Šator (Bosnian: Veliki Šator = English: Great Šator) which rises to 1,872 m (6,142 ft) above sea level, while somewhat isolated, on the eastern end, is Mali Šator (Bosnian: Mali Šator = English: Little Šator), slightly shorter at 1,768 m (5,801 ft). Two of the remaining three peaks exceed 1,750 m (5,741 ft) above sea level, while the third, the neighbor of Mali Šator, exceeds 1,800 m (5,906 ft) above sea level.

== Flora and fauna ==
South slopes of Šator are grassy, in spring covered with carpets of flowers. On the opposite, north side are steep cliffs and scree slopes (also: talus piles) and karst depression with lot of dwarf pine. Šator and area around the mountain were enormous pastures for thousands of cattle, which were driven from as far as Dalmatia, but are now almost depopulated.

== Tourism ==
Šator is a tame mountain in general, in a sense, and therefore more suitable for family trips instead of serious mountaineering. A mountain road that reaches Šatorsko Lake at 1,488 m (4,882 ft) above sea level, grassy slopes, carpets of flowers and dense forests make this mountain attractive for visitors.

== See also ==
- List of mountains in Bosnia and Herzegovina
- Šatorsko Lake
- Prekajsko Lake
- Unac River
- Vrelo Bastašice

== Bibliography ==
- Poljak, Željko (February 1959). "Šator". Kazalo za "Hrvatski planinar" i "Naše planine" 1898—1958 (PDF). Naše planine (in Croatian). Vol. XI. pp. 23–24. ISSN 0354-0650.
