= Bašigovačko Lake =

- Location within Bosnia and Herzegovina
- Interactive map of Bašigovačko Lake
- Location: Živinice, Bosnia and Herzegovina
- Coordinates: 44°25′03″N 18°41′21″E
- Type: lake

Bašigovačko Lake (Bašigovačko jezero) is a lake in the municipality of Živinice, eastern Bosnia and Herzegovina.
