= Stožišta =

Stožišta Стожишта
- Village
- Location within Bosnia and Herzegovina
- Coordinates: 44°12′34″N 16°17′44″E
- Country: Bosnia and Herzegovina
- Entity: Federation of Bosnia and Herzegovina
- Canton: Canton 10
- Municipality: Bosansko Grahovo

Area
  - Total: 10.55 km^{2} (4.07 sq mi)

Population (2013)
  - Total: 12
  - Density: 1.1/km^{2} (2.9/sq mi)
- Time zone: UTC+1 (CET)
  - Summer (DST): UTC+2 (CEST)

Stožišta (Serbian Cyrillic: Стожишта) is a village in the Municipality of Bosansko Grahovo in Canton 10 of the Federation of Bosnia and Herzegovina, an entity of Bosnia and Herzegovina.

== Demographics ==
According to the 2013 census, its population was 12, all Serbs.

== Bibliography ==
- Ethnicity/National Affiliation, Religion and Mother Tongue (PDF). Sarajevo: Agency for Statistics of Bosnia and Herzegovina. 2019.
