= Martin Brod =

Martin Brod Мартин Брод
- Village
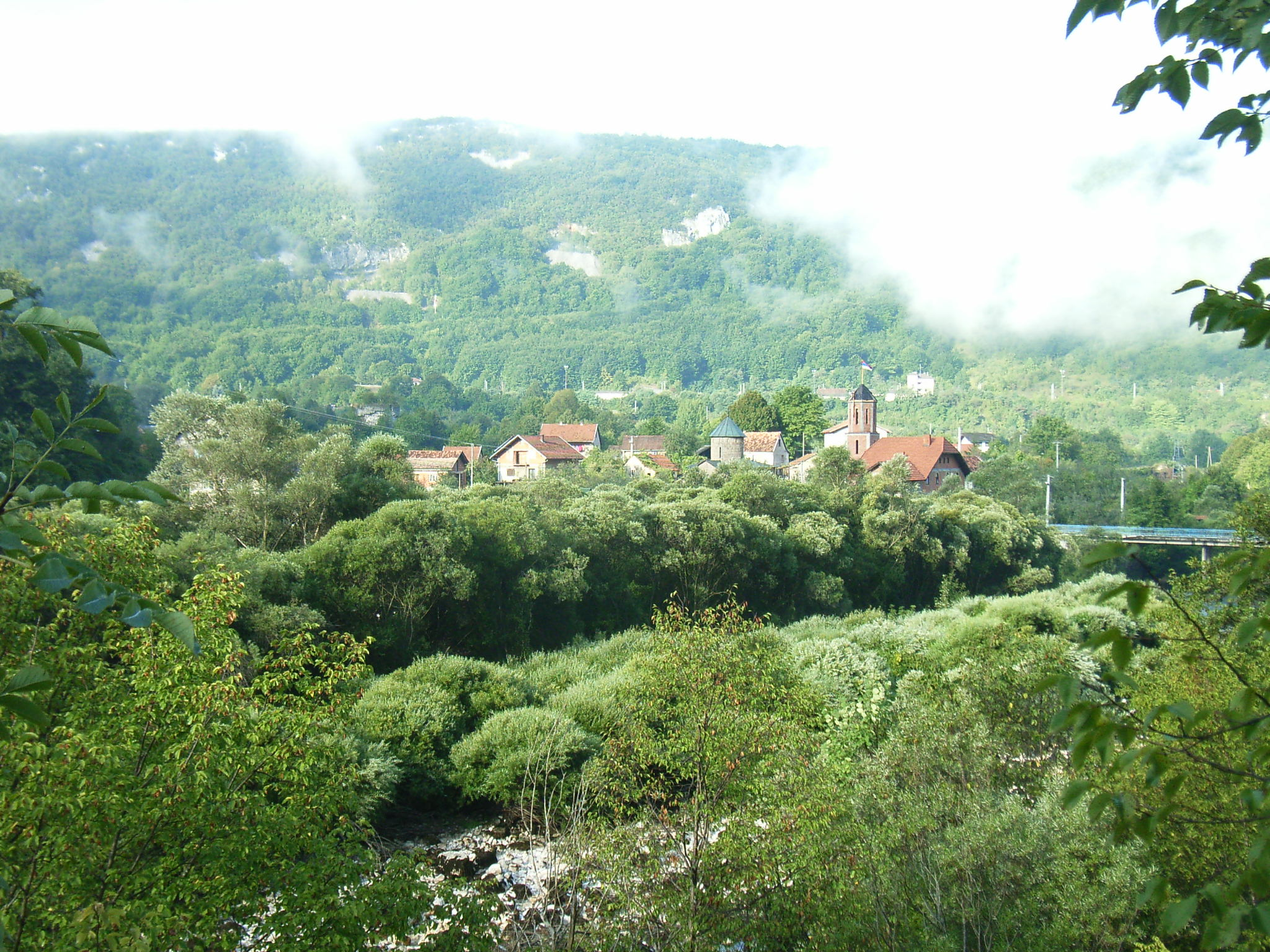
- View at Martin Brod

- Location within Bosnia and Herzegovina
- Coordinates: 44°29′19.8″N 16°08′30.7″E
- Country: Bosnia and Herzegovina
- Entity: Federation of Bosnia and Herzegovina
- Canton: Una-Sana
- Municipality: Bihać

Area
  - Total: 1.49 sq mi (3.85 km^{2})
- Elevation: 1,080 ft (330 m)

Population (2013)
  - Total: 124
  - Density: 83.4/sq mi (32.2/km^{2})
- Time zone: UTC+1 (CET)
  - Summer (DST): UTC+2 (CEST)

Martin Brod (Serbian Cyrillic: Мартин Брод) is a village in the municipality of Bihać, Bosnia and Herzegovina.

It is mostly known for its proximity to Una National Park, which is Bosnia and Herzegovina's largest national park.

The Una forms a number of calcareous sinter banks and cascades near Martin Brod, including around the Milančetov buk waterfall, before it receives the Unac just north of the village.

The confluence of Una and Unac is the location of the medieval Rmanj Fortress, as well as the Rmanj Monastery.

== Demographics ==
According to the 2013 census, its population was 124.

Ethnicity in 2013
Ethnicity	Number	Percentage
Serbs	120	97.5%
Bosniaks	1	0.2%
other/undeclared	3	2.3%
Total	124	100%

== Gallery ==
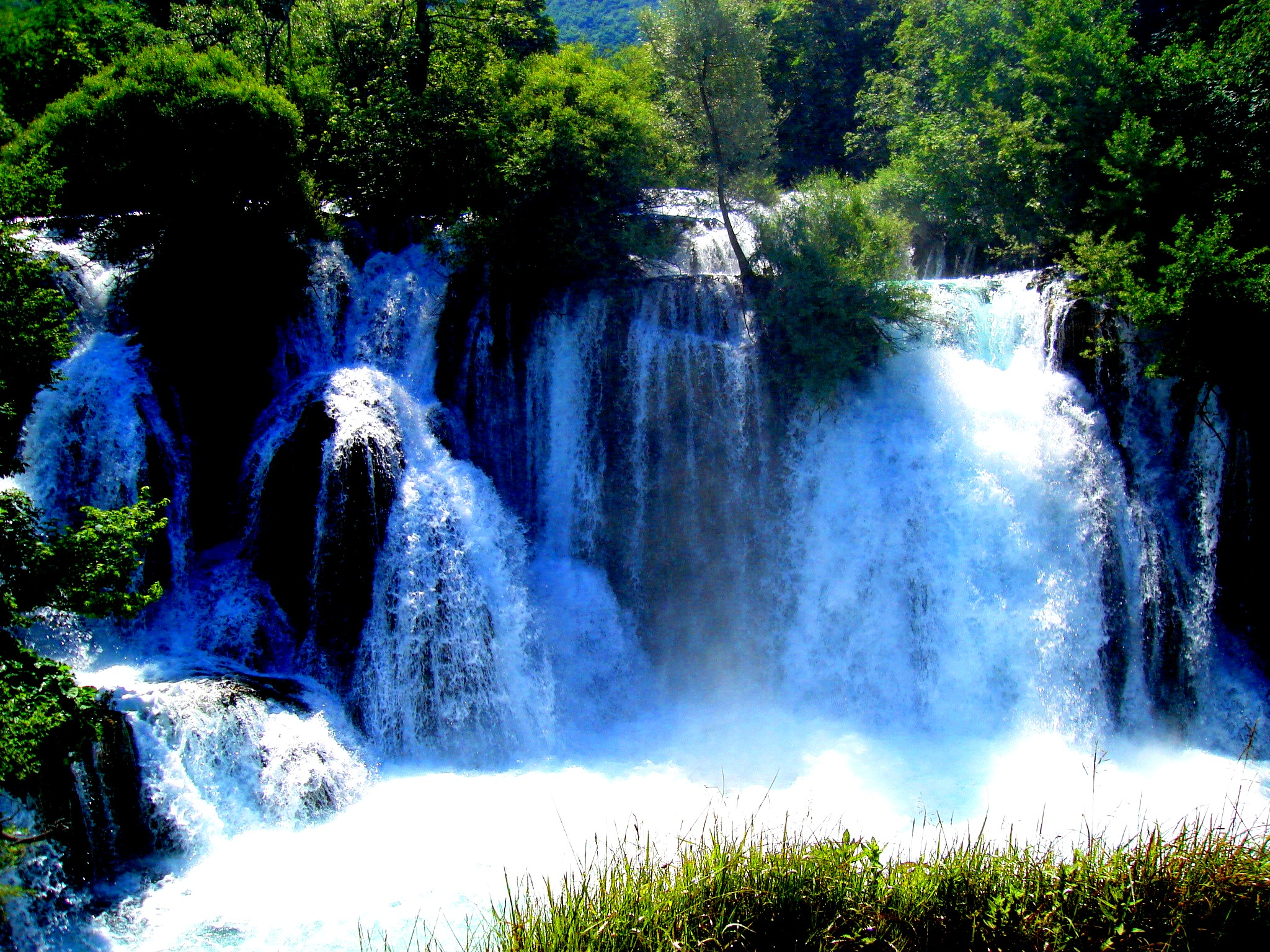
Waterfall on Una river in Martin Brod

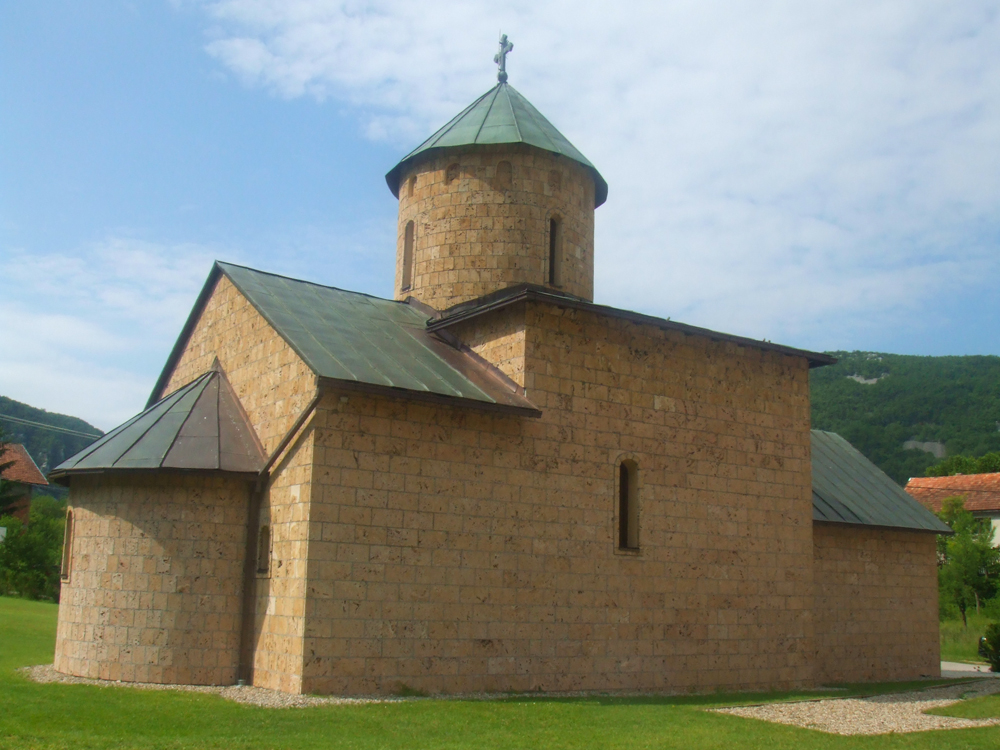
Rmanj Monastery

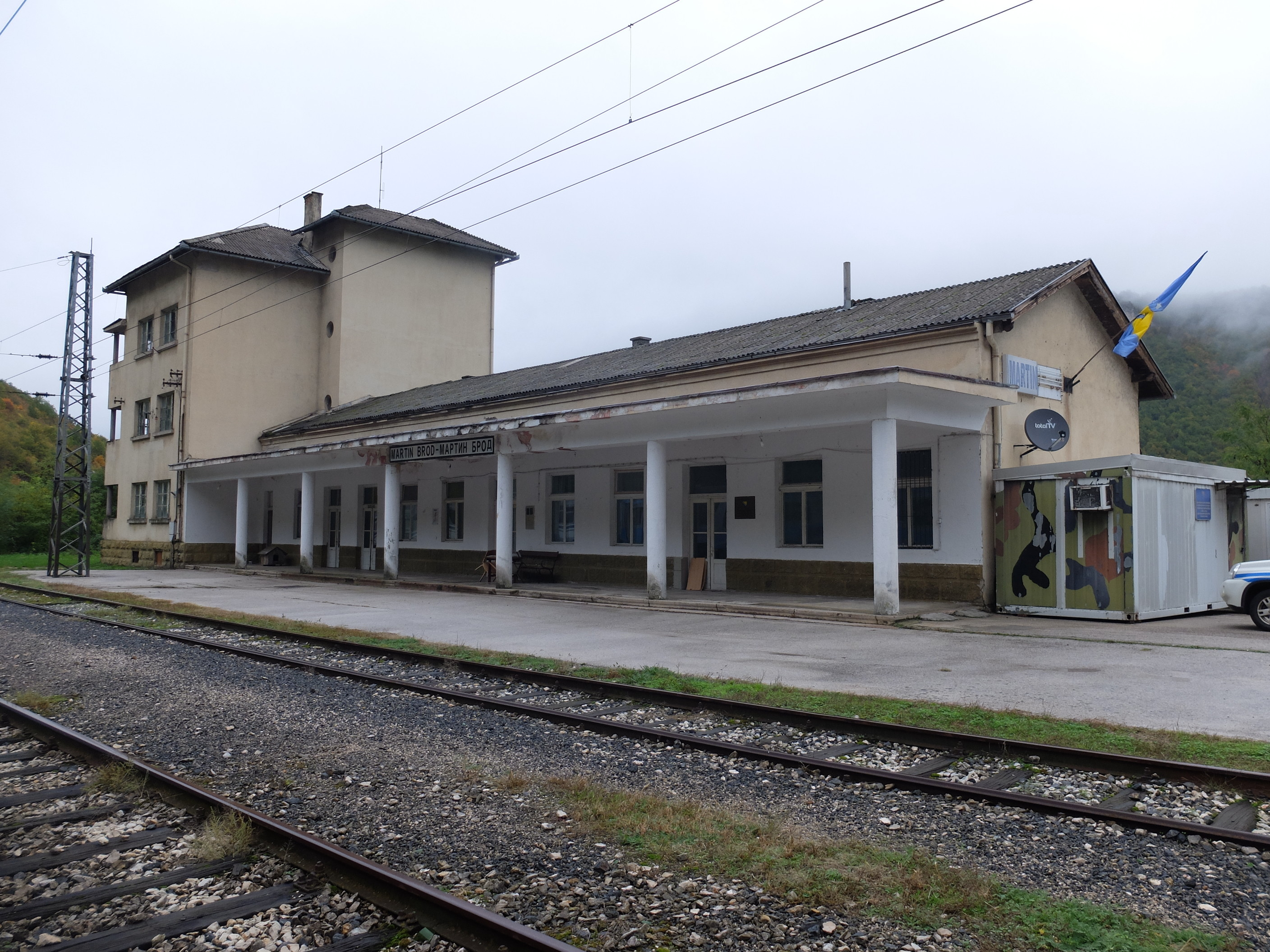
Railway station
