= Preodac =

Preodac Преодац
- Village
- Location within Bosnia and Herzegovina
- Coordinates: 44°13′N 16°35′E
- Country: Bosnia and Herzegovina
- Entity: Federation of Bosnia and Herzegovina
- Canton: Canton 10
- Municipality: Bosansko Grahovo

Area
  - Total: 44.20 km^{2} (17.07 sq mi)

Population (2013)
  - Total: 39
  - Density: 0.88/km^{2} (2.3/sq mi)
- Time zone: UTC+1 (CET)
  - Summer (DST): UTC+2 (CEST)

Preodac (Serbian Cyrillic: Преодац) is a village in the Municipality of Bosansko Grahovo in Canton 10 of the Federation of Bosnia and Herzegovina, an entity of Bosnia and Herzegovina.

== Demographics ==
According to the 2013 census, its population was 39, all Serbs.

== Bibliography ==
- Ethnicity/National Affiliation, Religion and Mother Tongue (PDF). Sarajevo: Agency for Statistics of Bosnia and Herzegovina. 2019.
