= Krka =

Krka may refer to:

== Rivers ==
- Krka (Adriatic Sea), a tributary of the Adriatic Sea in Croatia
- Krka (Sava), a tributary of the Sava in Slovenia
- Krka (Una), a tributary of the Una on the border of Bosnia and Herzegovina and Croatia
- Krka (Ledava), the Slovene name of Kerka, a river in Slovenia and Hungary
- Krka (Drava), the Slovene name of Gurk, a river in Austria

== Organizations ==
- Krka (company), a pharmaceutical company in Novo Mesto, Slovenia, named after the Slovene river
- Sanjak of Krka, a province (sanjak) of the Ottoman Empire, during the 16th and 17th centuries
- Krka National Park in Croatia
- Krka monastery, a medieval Orthodox monastery in Croatia
- KRKA (FM), a radio station (103.9 FM) licensed to serve Severance, Colorado, United States
- KRKA, former callsign of KHXT, an FM radio station in Erath, Louisiana, USA

== Places ==
- Krka, Ivančna Gorica, a settlement in the Municipality of Ivančna Gorica, Slovenia.
- Gurk, Carinthia, known as Krka in Slovene

== Sports ==
- BC Krka, a basketball club from Novo Mesto
- NK Krka a football club from Novo Mesto
- MRK Krka, a handball club from Novo Mesto

== See also ==
- Gurk (disambiguation)
