= Una National Park =

National park in Bosnia and Herzegovina

- Nacionalni park Una / Национални парк Уна
- IUCN category II (national park)
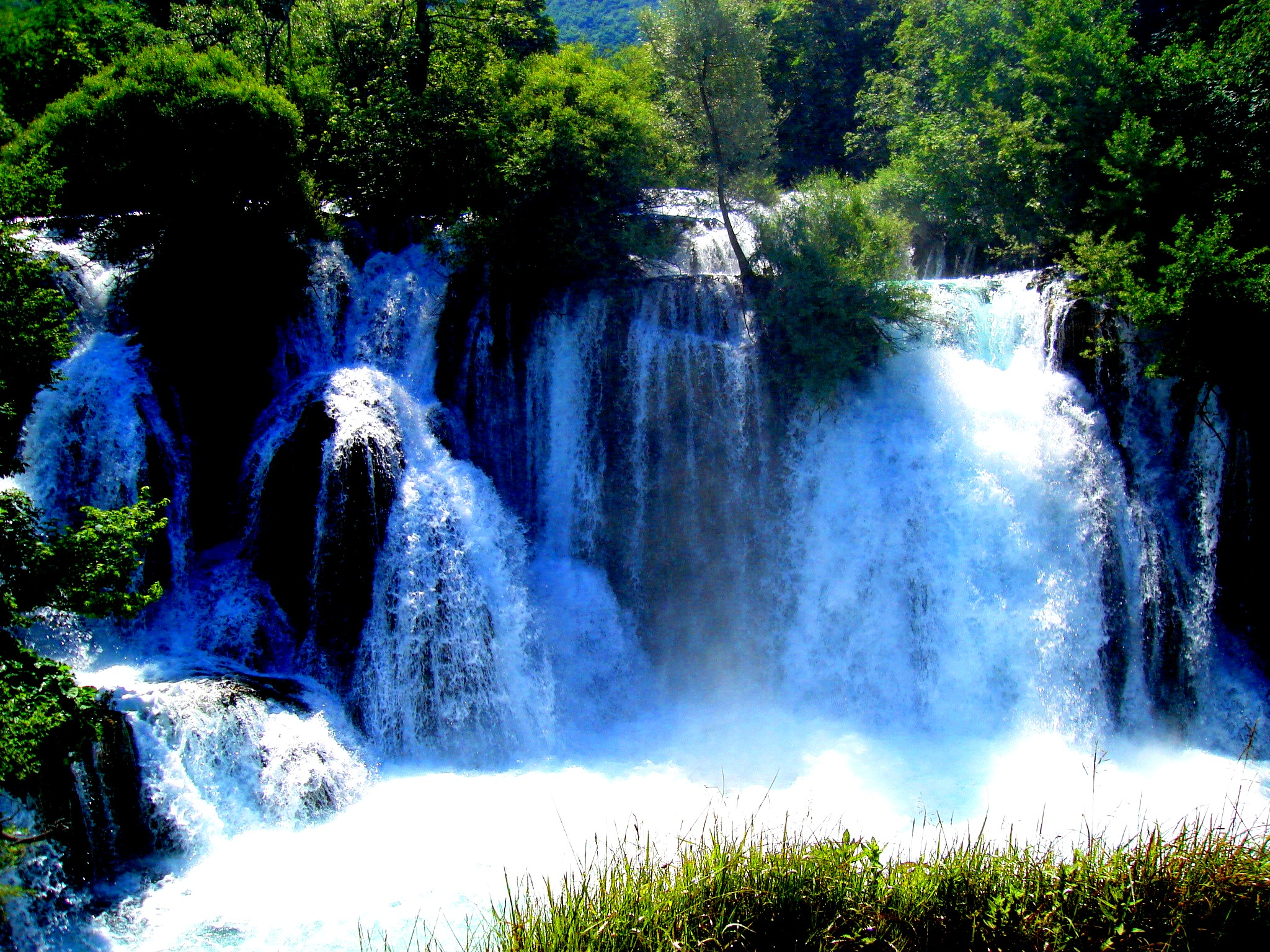
- System of number of waterfalls and cascades on the Una River in National Park Una at Martin Brod, Bosnia and Herzegovina
- Interactive map of Una National Park
- Location: Bosnia and Herzegovina
- Nearest city: Bihać
- Coordinates: 44°29′42.96″N 16°08′05.96″E
- Area: 350.0 km^{2} (135.1 sq mi)
- Established: 2008
- Governing body: Javno preduzeće Nacionalni park Una, Bihać
- Website: www.nationalpark-una.ba

Una National Park (Serbo-Croatian: Национални парк Уна, Nacionalni park Una) was established on 29 May 2008 around the rivers Upper Una River, Krka and the Unac. It is Bosnia and Herzegovina's largest national park. The main purpose of the park is to protect the unspoiled Una river and its tributaries Krka and Unac, which run through it.

== Geography ==
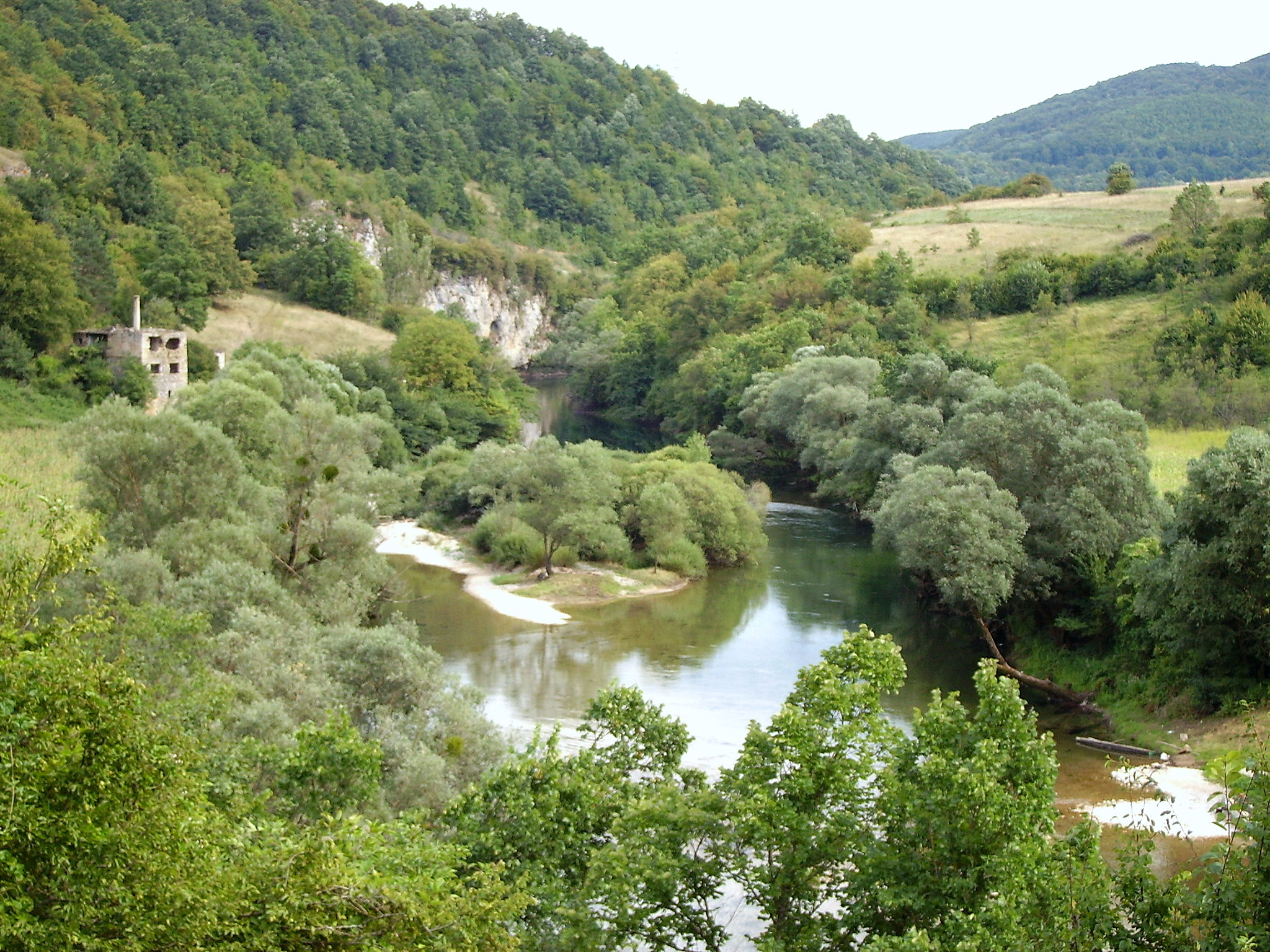
The Una canyon in National Park Una near Kulen Vakuf, Bosnia and Herzegovina

Protection zone of the National Park is 198 km^{2} (76 sq mi), and stretches on the western side from the source of the Krka river and its course to the confluence with the Una on the state border of Bosnia and Herzegovina with Croatia from where park border follows the Una and state border to the town of Martin Brod and confluence with the Unac. On the eastern side border of the park goes from the entrance of the Unac River into its canyon, few kilometers downstream from town of Drvar, and follows the Unac and its canyon all the way to the confluence with the Una in town of Martin Brod. From there park border follows the Una on the right and state border between Bosnia and Herzegovina and Croatia on the left, until it reach a small town of Ripač, few kilometers upstream from town of Bihać. National park Una areal distribution is within following geographic coordinates:

- northernmost point: 44°44′33″N 15°57′58″E (inhabited settlement Podastrana)
- southernmost point: 44°21′02″N 16°13′05″E (hill Gradina 676 metres (2,218 ft))
- westernmost point: 44°43′46″N 15°54′12″E (hill 509 metres (1,670 ft))
- easternmost point: 44°23′46″N 16°20′42″E (locality Vrtočke Bare English: Vrtočke Marshes)

== Waters ==
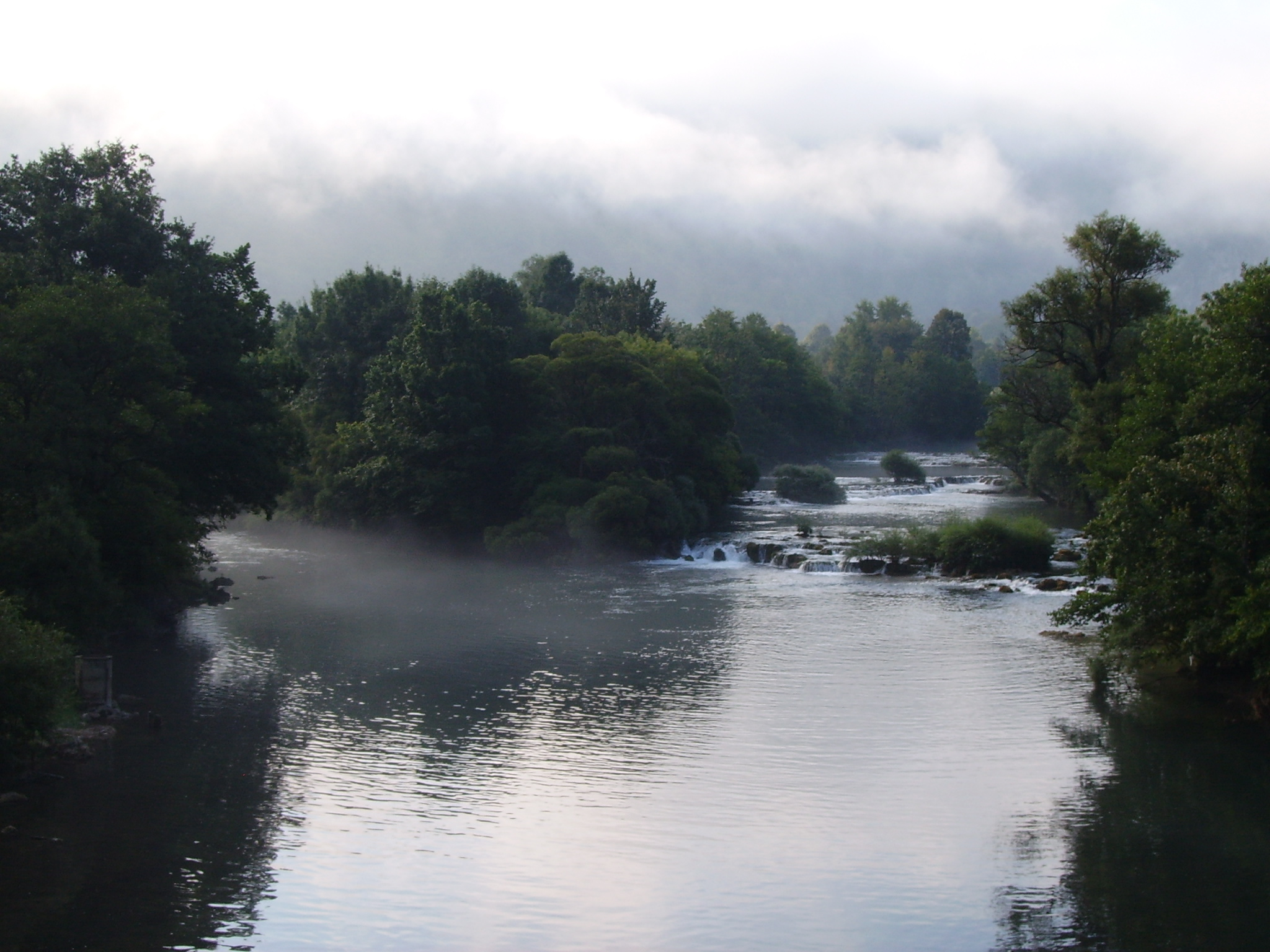
The Unac and Una confluence in National Park Una at Martin Brod, Bosnia and Herzegovina

The Una's waterfalls and white water rapids highlight the park. The most famous waterfalls are those at Martin Brod. The Una forms a number of calcareous sinter banks and cascades near Martin Brod, including around the Milančetov buk waterfall.

A popular "International Una Regatta" kayaking competition begins at Martin Brod, and the waterfall of Štrbački Buk is found further downstream.

Throughout the park, visitors can enjoy prime conditions for rafting, fishing, cycling, hiking, and camping. Jumping from the city bridges in Bihać and Bosanska Krupa is also popular. Largest waterfall on the Una river is Štrbački Buk, and is one of the main feature in the Park.

== Flora and fauna ==
Una National Park is also noted for its biodiversity, with 30 fish species, 130 bird species, and other animals, including lynx, fox, wolf, bear and chamois.

== History ==
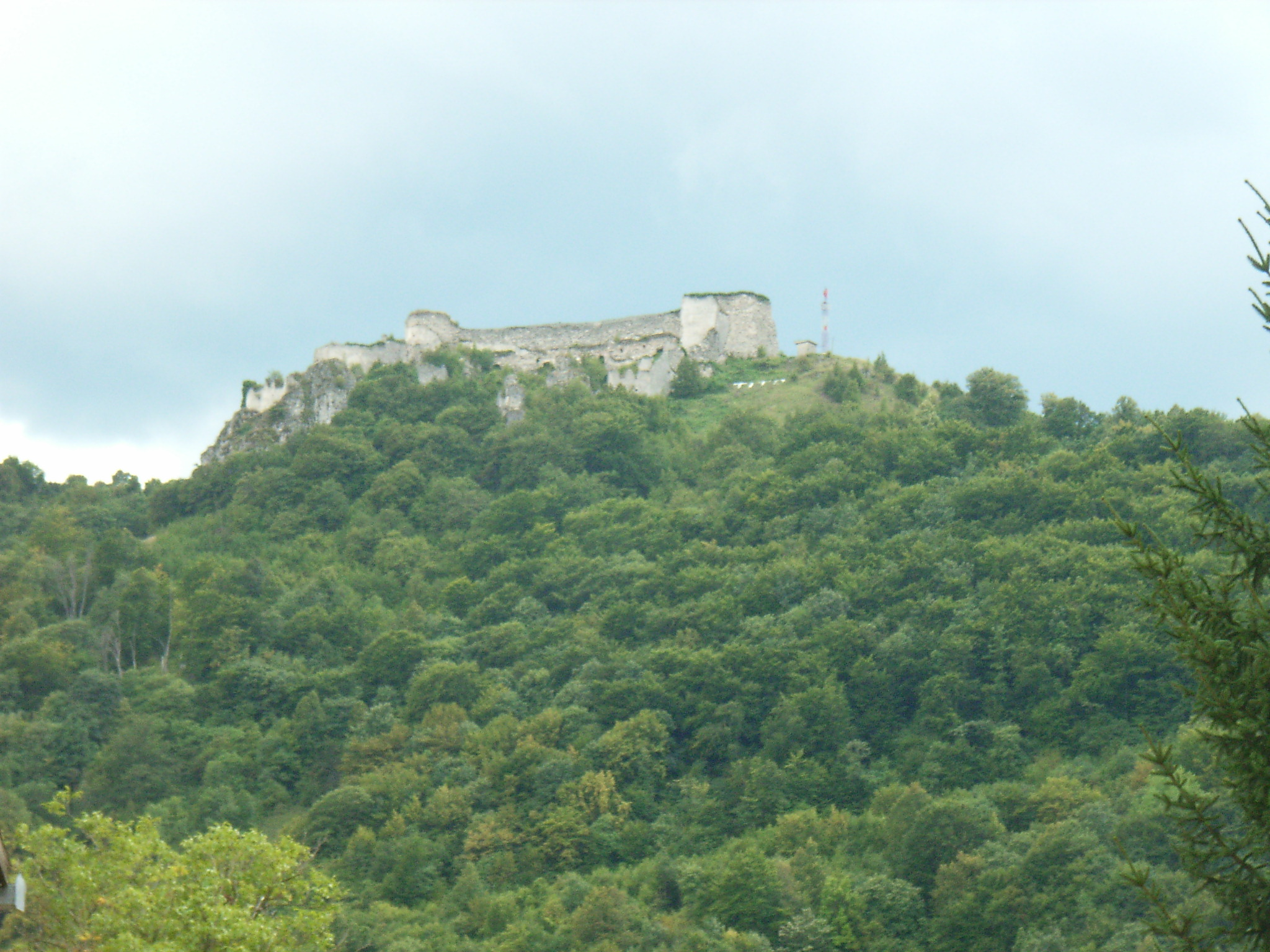
Ostrovica medieval fortress in National Park Una above Kulen Vakuf, Bosnia and Herzegovina

Area of the park has rich cultural-historic heritage and numerous archaeological sites, many dating from the prehistoric period. Significant historical and cultural heritage of the area within and outside the park zone are the Roman fort Milančeva Kula, Rmanj Monastery, medieval fortress Ostrovica above Kulen Vakuf, as well as outside the park zone Sokolačka Kula fortress in Sokolac village near Bihać and Ostrožac Castle between Bihać and Bosanska Krupa.

== Peace Park Plitvice-Una ==
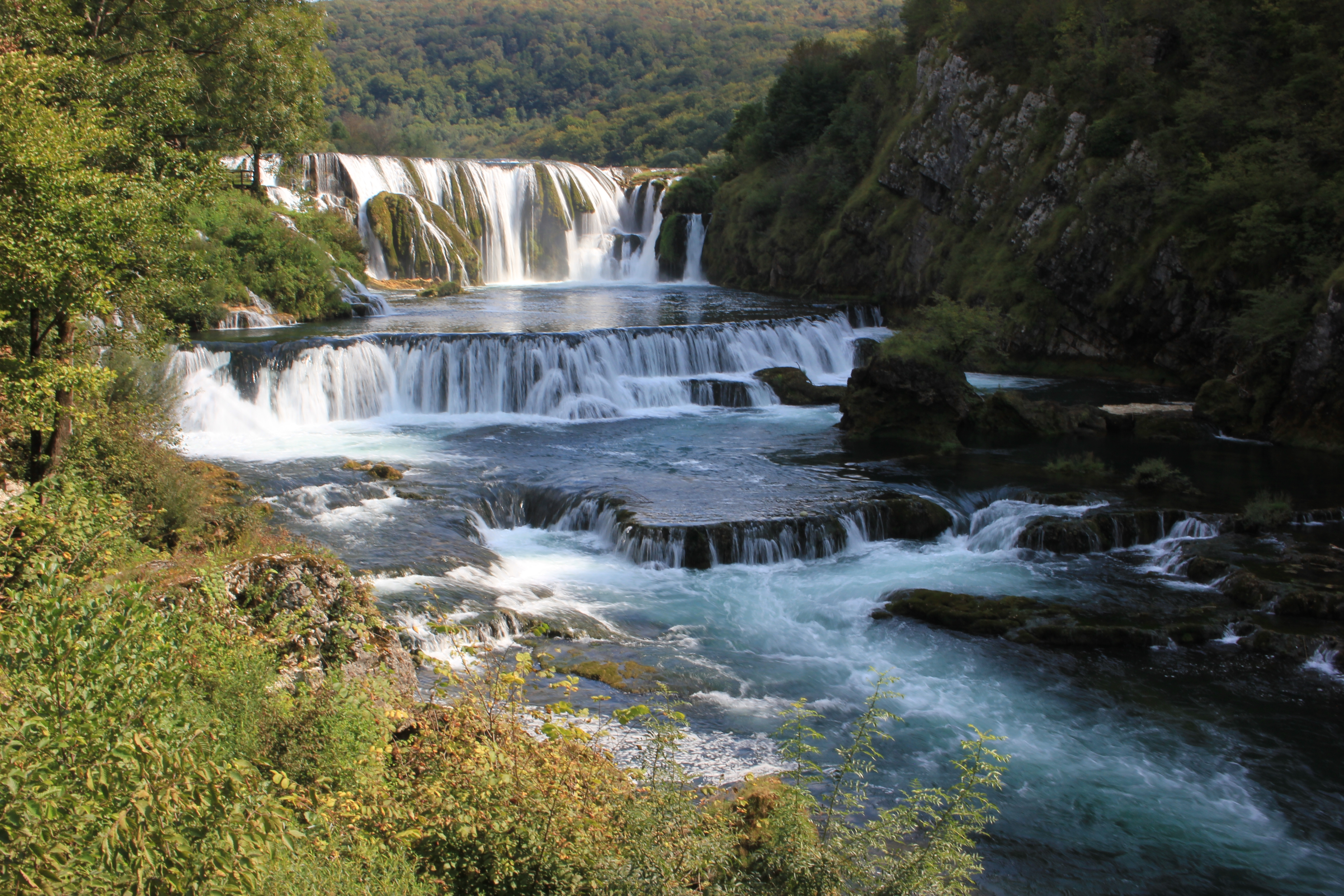
Štrbački Buk in National Park Una

Proximity between Plješivica mountain virgin forest, which stretches on both sides of Bosnia and Herzegovina-Croatian border, and Bosnia and Herzegovina's and Croatia’s national parks Una and Plitvice Lakes respectively gave rise to an idea of joint management and promotion via territorial connection and cooperation between two cross-border parks by establishing another one, Peace Park Plitvice-Una.

== See also ==
- List of protected areas of Bosnia and Herzegovina

== Sources ==
- "Zakon o Nacionalnom parku "Una"". Službene novine Federacije BiH (in Bosnian). August 2008.
