= Una (Sava) =

River between Bosnia and Herzegovina and Croatia

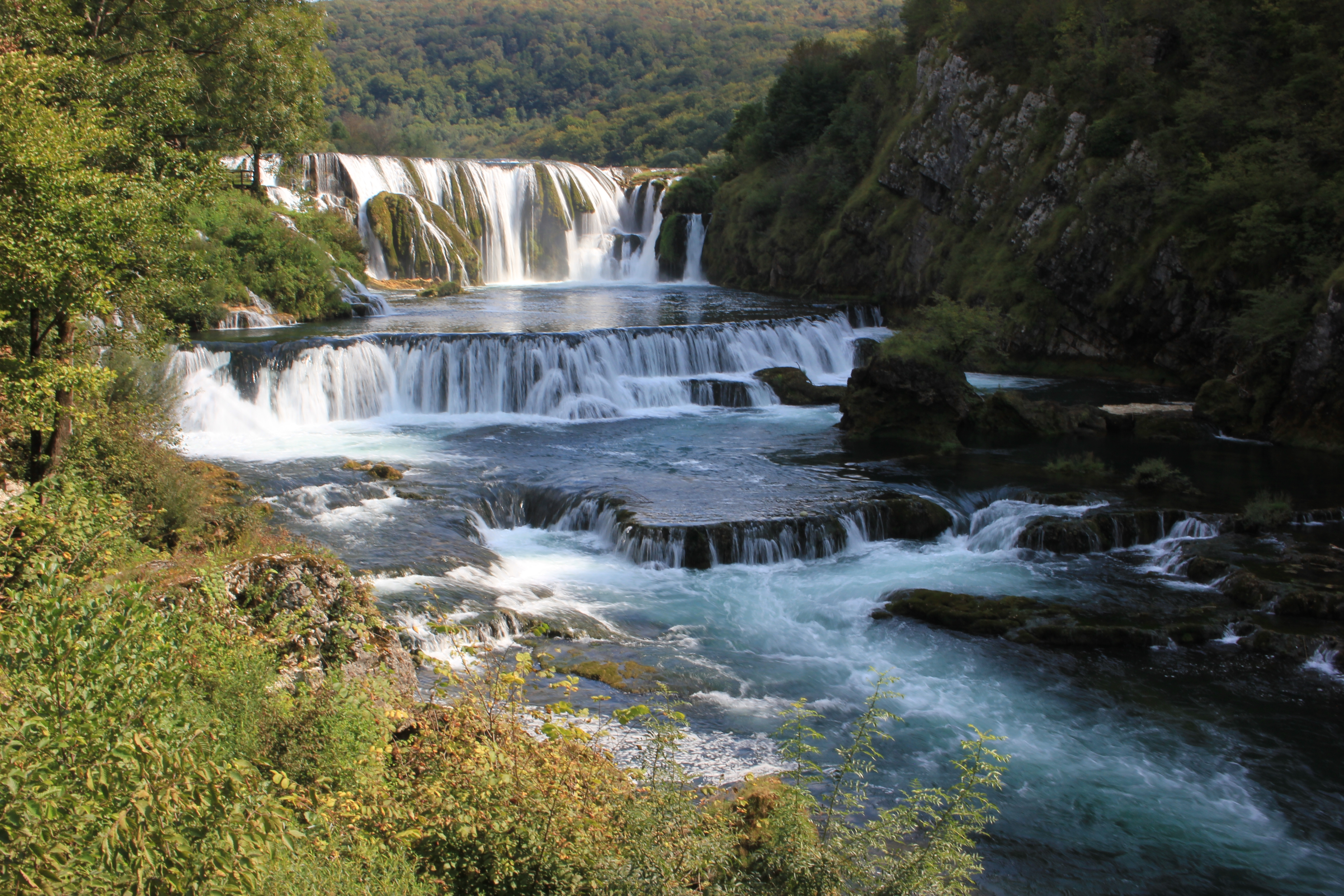
- The Štrbački buk waterfall on the Una river
- Etymology: Latin una - one, unique

Location
- Countries: Bosnia and Herzegovina; Croatia

Physical characteristics
- Source: Vrelo Une
  - location: Donja Suvaja
  - coordinates: 44.399457°N 16.103796°E
  - elevation: 358,850 m (1,177,330 ft)
- Mouth: Sava
  - location: Jasenovac
  - coordinates: 45.270°N 16.918°E
  - elevation: 95 m (312 ft)
- Length: 214.6 km (133.3 mi)
- Basin size: 10,200 km^{2} (3,900 sq mi)
- Discharge
  - location: Mouth
  - average: 240.3 m^{3}/s (8,490 cu ft/s)
  - minimum: 40.95 m^{3}/s (1,446 cu ft/s)
  - maximum: 1,500 m^{3}/s (53,000 cu ft/s)

Basin features
- Progression: Sava—Danube—Black Sea
- River system: Sava basin
- Population: 620.373
- Tributaries
  - left: Ostrovica; Dobrenica; Klokot
  - right: Unac; Sana; Krušnica
- Waterfalls: Štrbački buk; Milančev buk; Troslap; Dvoslap; Ripački slap; Slapovi Sunca; Mujin slap; Amerikančevi slapovi; Brvice buk; Buk i brzaci Jotanovih otoka; Kostela; Kanjon Grmuše

The Una (Serbian Cyrillic: Уна, pronounced [ûna]) is a border river between Bosnia and Herzegovina and Croatia and a right tributary of the Sava river. It is part of the Black Sea drainage basin, and its watershed has a size of 10,200 km^{2} (3,900 mi^{2}), of which 8,080 km^{2} (3,120 mi^{2}) belongs to Bosnia and Herzegovina, and 2,120 km^{2} (820 mi^{2}) to Croatia. The total length of the river is 212 km (132 mi). The source of the river is located near the village of Donja Suvaja in Croatia, and its mouth is located near the village of Jasenovac, on the border with Bosnia. The largest right tributaries are the Krka, Unac, Krušnica and Sana rivers, and the largest left tributary is the Klokot river. Its longest headwater is the Unac river. The largest and most important city located on the river is Bihać. Other important cities and towns are Bosanska Krupa, Bosanski Novi and Bosanska Kostajnica. The river is characterized by a multitude of waterfalls, rapids, karst springs and relatively untouched nature. A large part of the upper river is part of the Una National Park.

== Etymology ==
According to local legends, the river was named by the Romans who, after seeing it for the first time, said una (lat. one, as a reference to its unique beauty) to describe it.

Una is a popular female name even in the areas that are not located in the vicinity of the river. One explanation for this is that people that were displaced during the Yugoslav Wars continued to give the name to their children.

== Geography ==
=== Sources ===
The source of the Una river is located near the Croatian village of Donja Suvaja and consists of multiple smaller springs. The largest spring by discharge is a large karst spring at an elevation of 396 m (1,299 ft) above sea level, called Vrelo Une, and is considered to be the main spring of the river. The water, originating from great depths, forms a round, calm, bluish green lake, thirty meters by fifteen meters in size, surrounded by forests and steep cliffs of the Lička Plješevica and Stražbenica mountain ranges. The Una river, flowing out of the spring, forms its first travertine cascade roughly 20 meters downstream and another large waterfall 3 – 4 meters in height roughly 100 meters downstream. The spring itself was explored and mapped up to a depth of 248 meters, which makes it the deepest explored spring in the Dinaric karst region and the fifth deepest in the world. Due to its unique aesthetic, ecological, geomorphological and hydrological value, the spring and the surrounding region, totaling an area of 163 ha (400 acres), were declared a natural monument in 1968.

The karst aquifer of the Una is located mostly in the territory of Croatia. The aquifer itself takes up a large area from Korana in the northwest to Velika Popina in the southeast. It encompasses the mountainous areas of the Lička Plješevica, Čemernica and Mala Kapela mountains, and the Koreničko, Bijelopolje, Krbavsko and Lapačko polje karst fields. All aforementioned karst fields are directly connected to spring of the river itself, and other nearby springs (Klokot, Vedro Polje, Dobrenica, Ostrovica).

The discharge of the spring varies from a minimal 0.076 m^{3}/s (2.7 cu ft/s) recorded in 1987 to a maximal 98.1 m^{3}/s (3,460 cu ft/s) recorded in 2009, with the average discharge being 7.21 m^{3}/s (255 cu ft/s). The spring seems to have a limited outflow capacity, potentially caused by limited dimensions of the karst outflow channel, water retention in the karst, water flowing under pressure and water overflowing into other watersheds. The total amount of water that flows out of the spring yearly ranges between 105×10^{6} m^{3} (3.7×10^{9} ft^{3}) and 350×10^{6} m^{3} (1.2×10^{10} ft^{3}). The temperature of the water varies in relatively narrow margins of 8 to 11 °C (46 to 52 °F) with an average of 9.5 °C (49.1 °F), which also leads to the conclusion that the surfacing water spends a large amount of time in the karst underground. The average, minimal and maximal monthly and yearly discharges seemed to have increased in recent times, contrary to a trend of decreasing discharges from other springs in the nearby regions believed to be caused by global warming.

=== Upper course ===
The upper part of the river spans from its source to the city of Bihać.

After emerging from its source, the river flows for about 5 km before reaching its confluence with the Krka river, after which it forms the border between Bosnia and Croatia for about 7 km and then enters Bosnia completely for the first time, flowing through the village of Martin Brod where it forms a cascade of waterfalls with the total drop being about 54 m (177 ft). Downstream of Martin Bord, the Una more than doubles in size at its confluence with the Unac. After 9 km the river bends west at the town of Kulen Vakuf where it is joined by the small tributary Ostrovica before continuing to flow in a general northward direction. Downstream of Kulen Vakuf, the river meanders through a valley by the village of Klisa before again meeting the Croatian border after about 8 km. This time, the river forms the border for about 18 km and cuts through a gorge, forming a cascade of rapids and waterfalls, the biggest and most notable being the Štrbački buk. After entering Bosnia completely for the second time, the rivers forms the Troslap and Dvoslap waterfalls, after which it exits the national park and flows through the villages of Lohovo and Račić. After that, the river slowly enters the Bihać field, flowing through the villages of Ripač, Golubić and Pritoka, taking in the waters of the Dobrenica and forming multiple river islands and small waterfalls, before finally entering the city of Bihać after about 70 km of total flow. In Bihać, the river forms multiple islands of varying sizes, often surrounded by small waterfalls, some of which are private property while others are public and often popular bathing sites. The core of the city itself is surrounded by the Una river, and a channel carries water from the river to a small hydroelectric power plant. Another small tributary of the Una, the Drobinica, flows through the city in a regulated channel before merging with the Una. In its upper course, the Una is a youthful river with a steep gradient of 0.232% and a large amount of waterfalls. The total drop is 154 m (505 ft) over a distance of 66.5 km (41.3 mi). The deposition of carbonate minerals and the formation of porous limestone rock (tufa) and pronounced karst influence is characteristic for this section.

=== Middle course ===
The middle section of the river spans from the city of Bihać to the town of Novi Grad and its confluence with the Sana.

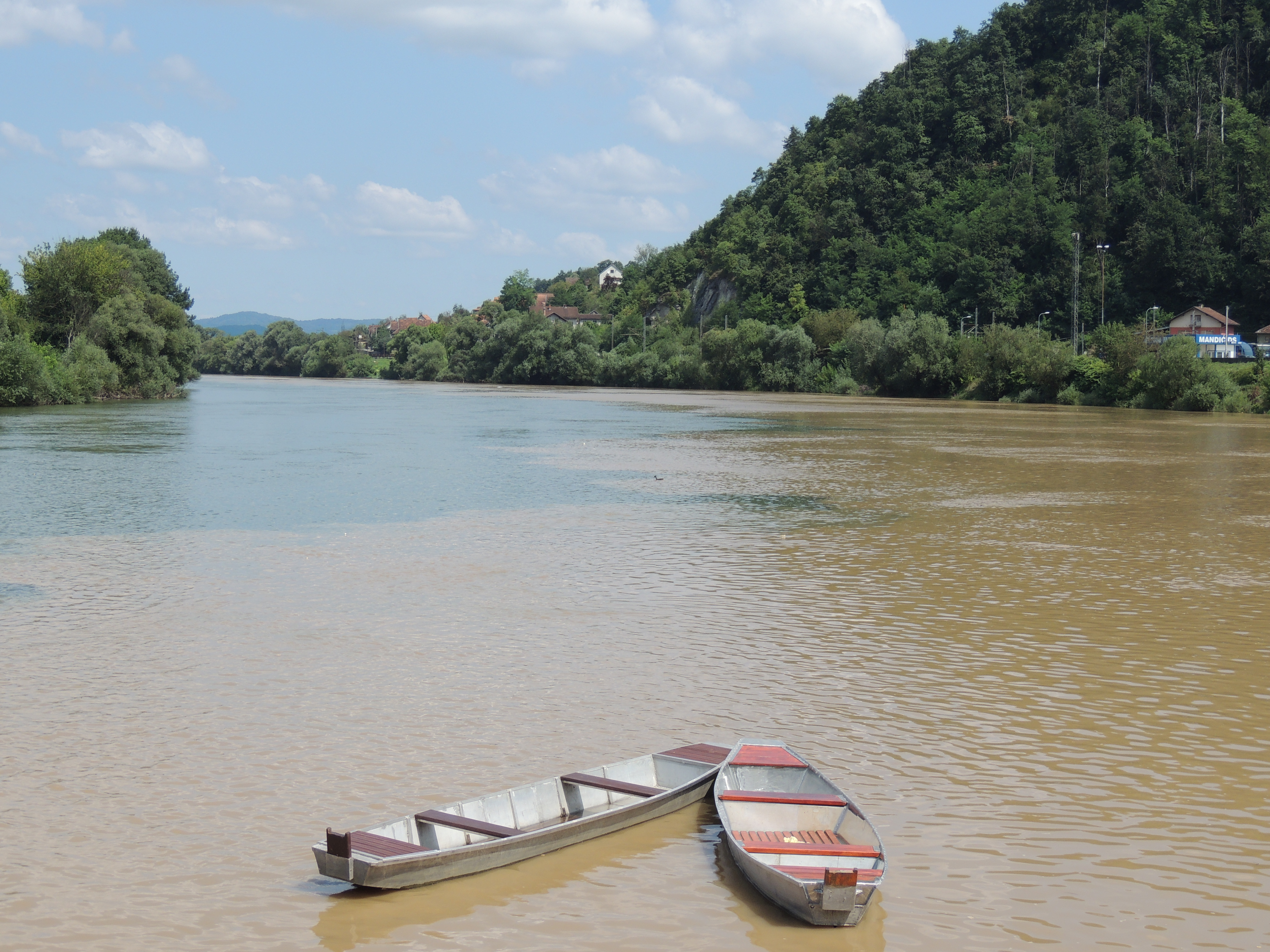
Downstream view of the confluence of the Una and Sana rivers

Not long after exiting the city the river takes in the waters from the short Klokot river, after which it meanders, slowly turning eastward before entering the village of Pokoj where it takes a sharp turn north and enters a canyon between Bihać and Bosanska Krupa where it slowly turns eastward again. The Una Kostela hydroelectric power plant is located not long after the entrance into the canyon and is currently one of two hydroelectric power stations on the main course of the river, the other being the small Bihać power plant. The canyon is, on average, around 150 m (490 ft) deep with lush vegetation growing on its cliffs. A road that connects Bihać and Bosanska Krupa follows the river through the canyon. After flowing for about 27 km through it, the river exits the canyon and enters the town of Bosanska Krupa where it takes a turn north. Like in Bihać, the river forms multiple islands surrounded by small waterfalls. Downstream of Bosanska Krupa, the river takes in the waters of the short Krušnica river before heading north towards the town of Bosanska Otoka, after which it forms the Inter-Entity Boundary Line and shortly after forms the border with Croatia for the last time, and remains a border river until its mouth. Not long after becoming the border, the river enters the town of Novi Grad, where the confluence with the Sana river is located. The Sana is the longest and most significant tributary of the Una and greatly increases the discharge of the river. Waterfalls and tufa are rarer in this section, albeit still present. The confluence with the Sana marks the end of the middle section of the river and the beginning of the lower section. The total length of the river between Bihać and Novi Grad is around 103 km (64 mi), with a gradient of 0.067% and drop of 69.5 m (228 ft).

=== Lower course ===
The lower section of the river spans from the town of Novi Grad to the river mouth.

After exiting the town of Novi Grad, the river flows in a general northeast direction until its confluence with the Sava river near Jasenovac. Major towns and villages on the river in this section are Novi Grad, Kostajnica and Kozarska Dubica on the right bank in Bosnia and Dvor na Uni, Hrvatska Kostajnica and Hrvatska Dubica on the left bank in Croatia. The waterfalls, rapids and tufa rock that were common in previous sections are almost completely nonexistent in the lower section as the Una takes up the characteristics of a mature river, meandering through alluvial plains and having a low gradient. Near its confluence with the Sava exist a couple of oxbow lakes colloquially called Stara Una (lit. "Old Una"). After a total length of about 212 km, the Una flows into the Sava river near the Croatian village of Jasenovac. The total length of the river between Novi Grad and Jasenovac is around 72 km (45 mi), with a gradient of 0.041% and drop of 29.6 m (97 ft).

== Hydrography ==
=== Watershed ===
The watershed of the Una river has a total area of 10,200 km^{2} (3,900 sq mi), of which 79% (8,080 km^{2} or 3,120 mi^{2}) belongs to Bosnia and Herzegovina, and 21% (2,120 km^{2} or 820 mi^{2}) to Croatia. It borders the watersheds of the Korana, Glina and Sunja to the northwest, the Adriatic watersheds of the Lika, Zrmanja and Cetina to the southwest, the watershed of the Cetina to the south and the watersheds of the Vrbas and Jablanica to the east. The shape of the watershed itself is very irregular, but roughly triangular. Due to strong karst influence in the area, the watershed is poorly developed with few large surface streams. The karstification coefficient for the entire watershed is 0.244, which means that 24.4% of the surface area in the watershed lacks proper surface streams and drainage. The karstification coefficient up to Bihać is 0.43, up to Novi Grad 0.28 and up to Kostajnica 0.26. The average air temperature in the area of the watershed is 10.2 °C (50.4 °F), and the average amount of annual rainfall is 79 mm (3.1 in).

The watersheds of the Una and the watersheds of the Korana and Glina are often grouped together for analytical purposes in Bosnia and Herzegovina.

=== Discharge ===
The Una river has an average discharge of 240.3 m^{3}/s (8,490 cu ft/s) at its mouth, with a minimal discharge of 40.95 m^{3}/s (1,446 cu ft/s). There are relatively small differences in the average monthly discharges (the driest month August has 37% of average yearly discharge while the wettest month April has 155%) and minimal daily and monthly discharges also show a very small difference. Low discharges last a relatively long time and high discharges appear quickly due to sudden rainfall and snowmelt and last a comparatively short amount of time. High discharges and water levels are present in April and December, and low discharges in August and January.

There are multiple measuring stations in Bosnia and Herzegovina on the Una, and their data is show in the tables below

Average discharge of the Una river
Measuring station	Average discharge (m^{3}/s)	Watershed area (km^{2})
Martin Brod upstream	21.0	790
Martin Brod downstream	51.6	1 950
Kulen Vakuf	53.2	2 028
Štrbački buk	65.0	2 586
Bihać	85.60	3 496
Kralje - Bihać	100.2	3 631
Bosanska Krupa	112.7	4 092
Bosanska Otoka	122.0	4 460
Entity line	124.4	4 540
Country border	126.2	4 611
Novi Grad upstream	131.6	4 798
Novi Grad downstream	218.5	8 997
Kostajnica	232.0	9 664
Dubica	238.0	10 024
Mouth	240.3	10 200

Average water level of the Una river
Measuring station	I	II	III	IV	V	VI	VII	VIII	IX	X	XI	XII
Martin Brod upstream	121	124	125	129	120	113	105	101	104	111	119	126
Martin Brod downstream	120	125	133	146	125	103	80.1	69.1	76.3	92.2	116	134
Kulen Vakuf	116	124	128	141	118	97.6	79.9	72.1	79.1	91.3	107	129
Štrbački buk	177	181	186	193	180	164	149	144	148	158	173	184
Bihać	28.9	33.9	35.8	41.6	32.7	22.5	13.3	8.0	10.1	17.0	27.8	35.2
Kralje - Bihać	162	171	182	202	173	140	115	106	109	129	151	175
Bosanska Krupa	99.7	106	112	123	104	83.8	62.2	50.2	56.2	71.7	87.1	106
Novi Grad upstream	171	173	184	201	164	132	103	88.4	98.5	117	149	176
Novi Grad downstream	103	116	138	160	115	71.1	32.3	8.0	17.9	45.1	83.2	119
Dubica	42.7	56.7	73.4	96.0	43.0	1.7	-31	-50	-43	-18	17.5	50.5

Percentage share of surface water and groundwater in the Una river in Bosanska Dubica
	I	II	III	IV	V	VI	VII	VIII	IX	X	XI	XII
Surface water	77.5	70.2	74.3	65.7	75.4	71.8	36.0	30.0	60.0	63.6	28.0	78.0
Groundwater	22.5	29.8	25.7	34.3	24.6	28.2	64.0	70.0	40.0	36.4	72.0	22.0

== Tributaries ==
The Una river has a relatively weakly developed network of tributaries, owing to its karst geology. Most of the tributaries are shorter rivers, albeit with strong sources and relatively large discharges. There is also a number of karst springs located directly at the main channel of the river. The right tributaries of the river are the Krka, Unac, Krušnica, Vojskova and Sana rivers, and the left tributaries are the Dobrenica, Drobinica, Klokot and Baštra rivers.

=== Sana ===
The Sana river is the longest and most important tributary of the Una river, with a watershed size of 4,258 km^{2} (1,644 sq mi) and average discharge of over 8 m^{3}/s (280 cu ft/s). Its source is located under Lisina mountain, 420 m above sea level. The longest headwater of the Sana is the Korana, whose source, Dobra Voda, is located at an elevation of 870 m above sea level, but is relatively insignificant in terms of discharge (1 m^{3}/s or 35 cu ft/s) when compared to the main source of the Sana river. The mouth of the Sana is located in Novi Grad, at an elevation of 117 m above sea level. The Sana has a high karstification coefficient of 0.43 at the Ključ measuring station, which has the consequence of the Sana watershed being relatively undeveloped and having few surface streams. The tributaries of the Sana river are the Banjica (53 km^{2} watershed area), Gomjenica (776 km^{2} ). Kozica (120 km^{2}), Ribnik (447 km^{2} ), Sanica (468 km^{2}), Kijevska rijeka (64 km^{2}), Dabar (111 km^{2}), Zdena (65 km^{2}), Blija (133 km^{2}), Majdanuša (60 km^{2}) and Japra (355 km^{2}).

The Sana flows through both entities of Bosnia and Herzegovina. Its source is located in Republika Srpska, after which it crosses the entity line and enters the Una - Sana Canton where it flows through Ključ and Sanski Most. After exiting Sanski Most, it crosses the entity line again and takes a sharp left turn at the foot of the Kozara mountain, after which it enters Prijedor and continues to flows towards its confluence with the Una in Novi Grad. The major cities and towns located on the banks of the river are Prijedor, Sanski Most and Ključ.

There are multiple measuring stations in Bosnia and Herzegovina on the Sana, and their data is show in the table below:

Average discharge of the Sana river
Measuring station	Average discharge (m^{3}/s)	Watershed area (km^{2})
Donja Pecka RS	9.3	447
Entity line	32.1	1 117
Ključ	33.2	1 149
Vrhpolje	43.0	1 153
Sanski Most	66.7	2 295
Entity line	72.0	2 261
Prijedor	81.4	3 509
Novi Grad	86.6	4 189

Average water level of the Sana river
Measuring station	I	II	III	IV	V	VI	VII	VIII	IX	X	XI	XII
Ključ	71.6	76.1	88.5	117	94.1	62.7	40.8	27.4	32.4	44.8	66.2	84.6
Vrhpolje	82.4	87.7	97.3	117	97.5	72.7	55.6	44.4	49.5	59.7	75.9	92.6
Sanski Most	171	178	191	209	188	164	147	134	139	150	167	183
Prijedor	119	131	145	164	132	96.9	72.8	54.2	60.9	79.8	103	129

=== Unac ===
The Unac river is the longest headwater of the Una, and, at their confluence, has a larger discharge and a larger watershed. The longest headwater of the Unac, Šatorski potok, flows out of Šator lake under the Šator mountain at an elevation of 1,460 m (4,790 ft) above sea level. The largest town on the Unac is Drvar, through which the river is regulated. The river is 66 km (41 mi) long and, throughout its course, flows through multiple gorges and canyons, the deepest one lying between Crno vrelo and Bereka in the National Park itself. It is 350 m (1,150 ft) deep and noted for its hydromorphological, geological, hydrological characteristics and its biodiversity. Throughout its course there is pronounced karst influence, and the river is partially disappears as a losing stream in part of its course, only to reappear at Crno vrelo, a couple of kilometers before its mouth.

There are multiple measuring stations in Bosnia and Herzegovina on the Unac, and their data is show in the table below:

Average discharge of the Unac river
Measuring station	Average discharge (m^{3}/s)	Watershed area (km^{2})
Drvar	7.7	359
Rmanj Monastery	30.5	1 161

Average water level of the Unac river
Measuring station	I	II	III	IV	V	VI	VII	VIII	IX	X	XI	XII
Drvar	28.3	31.8	36.2	53.6	29.0	17.5	5.0	3.7	8.1	15.9	27.0	36.5
Rmanj Monastery	103	106	118	141	119	88.9	61.4	45.2	54.0	69.5	95.9	116

=== Klokot ===
The Klokot is a short river with watershed area of about 94 km^{2} and a length of 4.5 km. It flows out of a very strong karst spring around 5 – 6 km west of Bihać and has an average discharge of 14 – 15 m^{3}/s.

Average water level of the Klokot river
Measuring station	I	II	III	IV	V	VI	VII	VIII	IX	X	XI	XII
Klokot	155	141	183	204	129	105	76.9	79.5	85.3	98.7	122	191

=== Krka ===
The Krka is a right tributary of the Una, and, for the entirety of its length, forms the border between Bosnia and Croatia. It is 4 km (2.5 mi) long and forms a small canyon. It has a watershed area of 119 km^{2} and is part of the Una National Park.

=== Krušnica ===
The Krušnica is a right tributary of the Una. Its source, a strong karst spring with an average discharge of 7 – 8 m^{3}/s, is located 6 km south of Bosanska Krupa. It is around 7 km (4.3 mi) long and has a watershed area of 301 km^{2}. One interesting thing to note about the river itself is the fact that a small branch of the Una river flows into the Krušnica first, before the Krušnica flows into the Una. A small hydroelectric power plant is also located near the river source.

The major tributaries of the Una

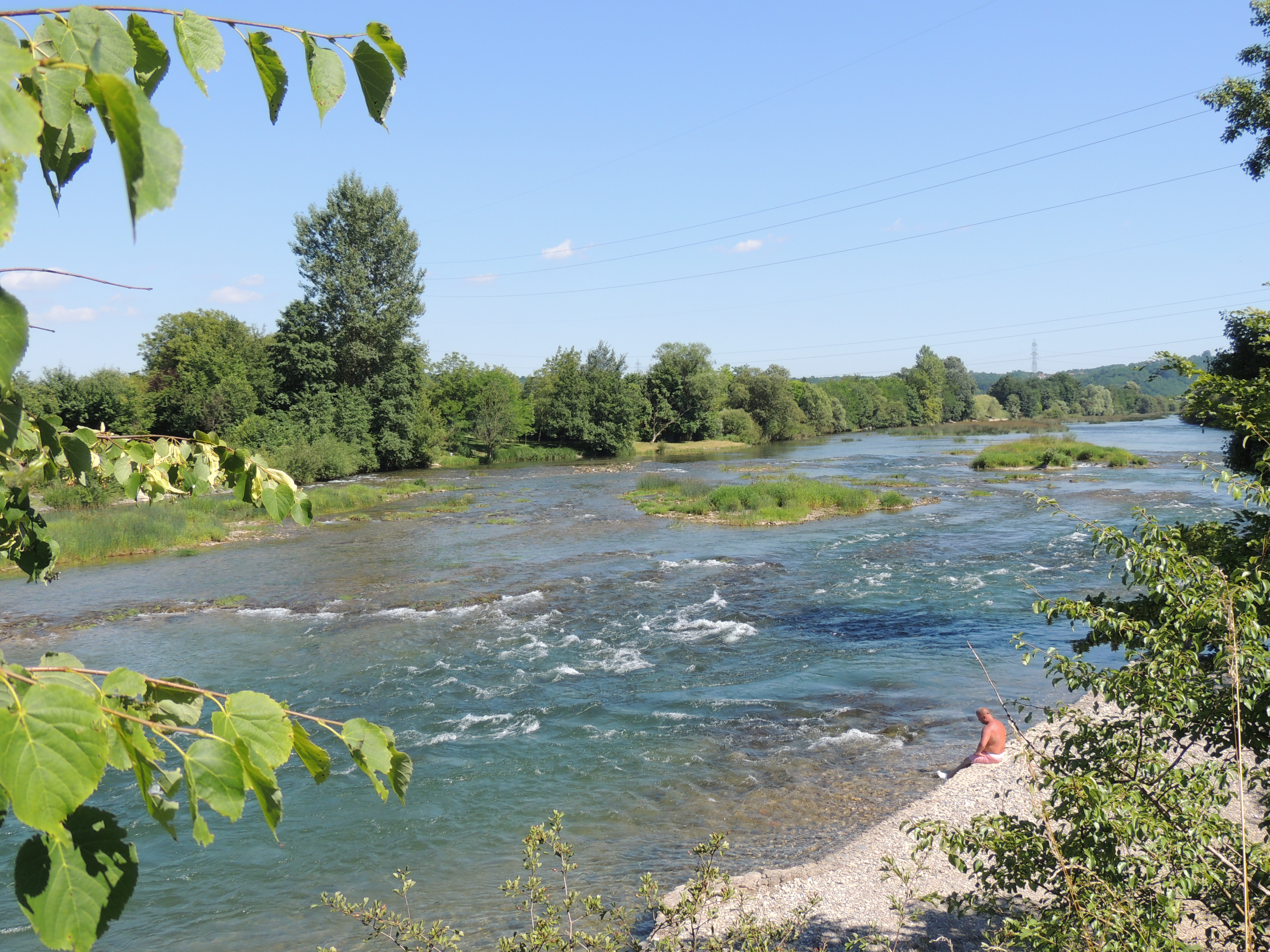
The lower course of the Sana

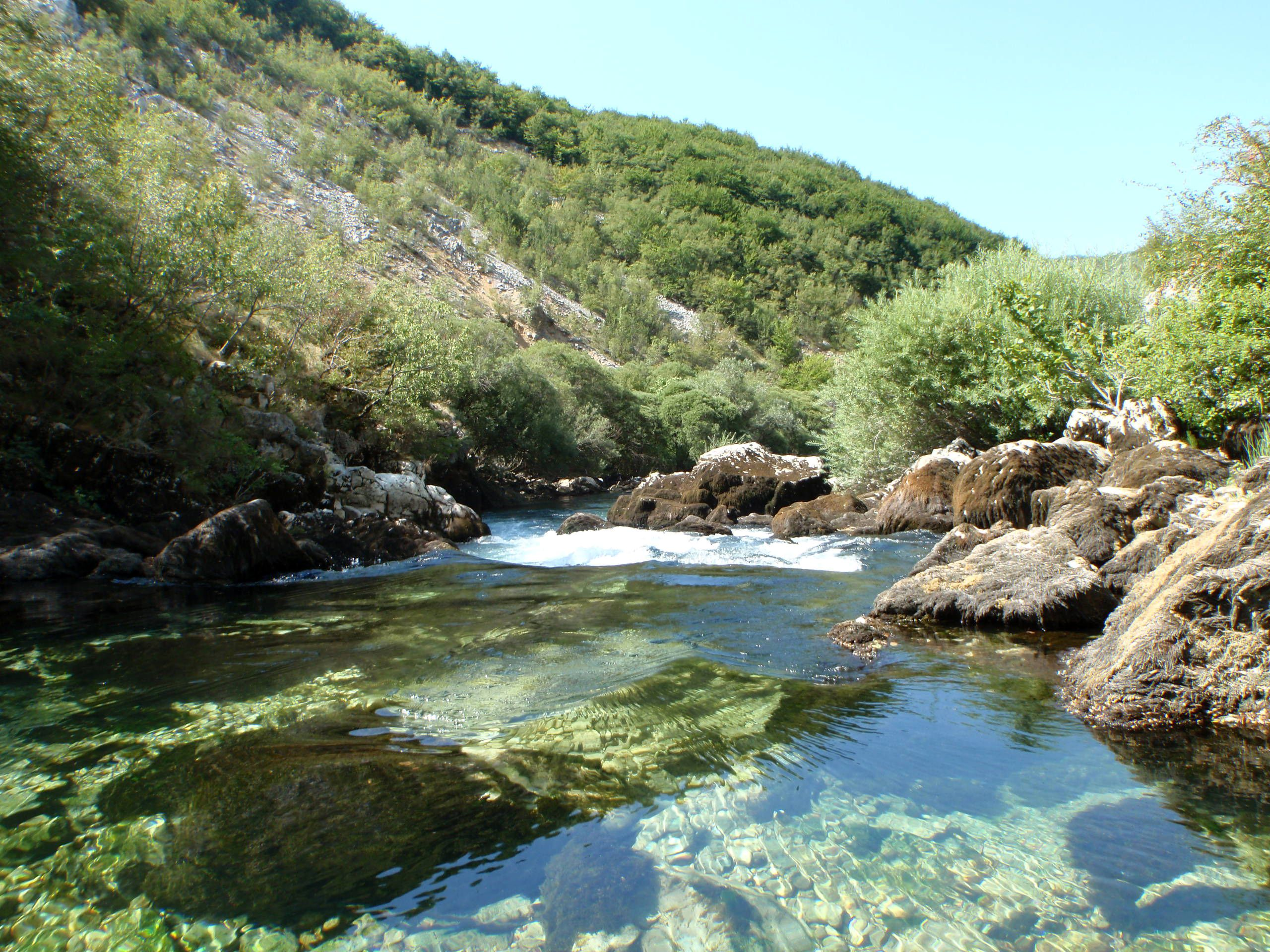
The Unac before Martin Brod

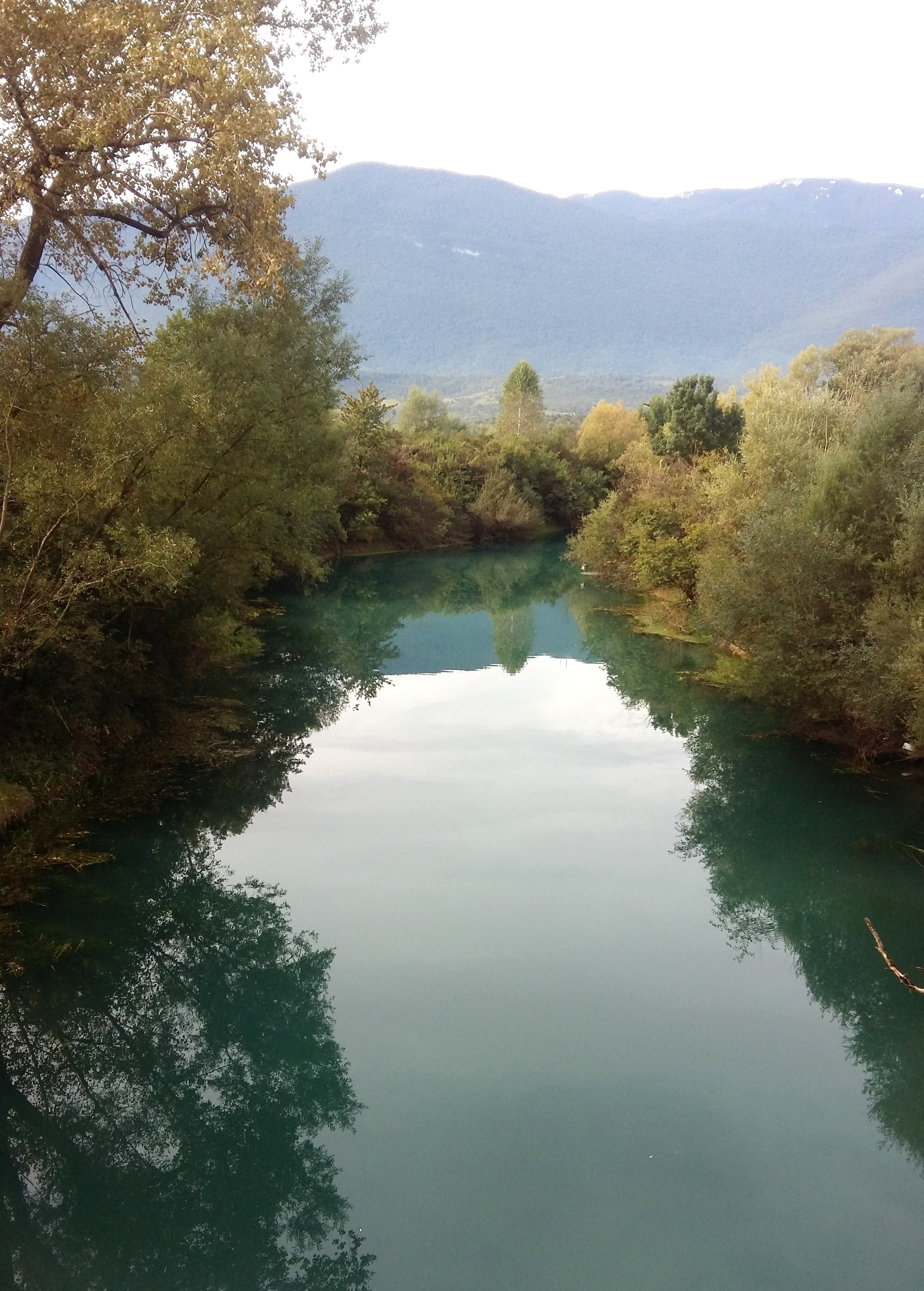
The Klokot in Bihać

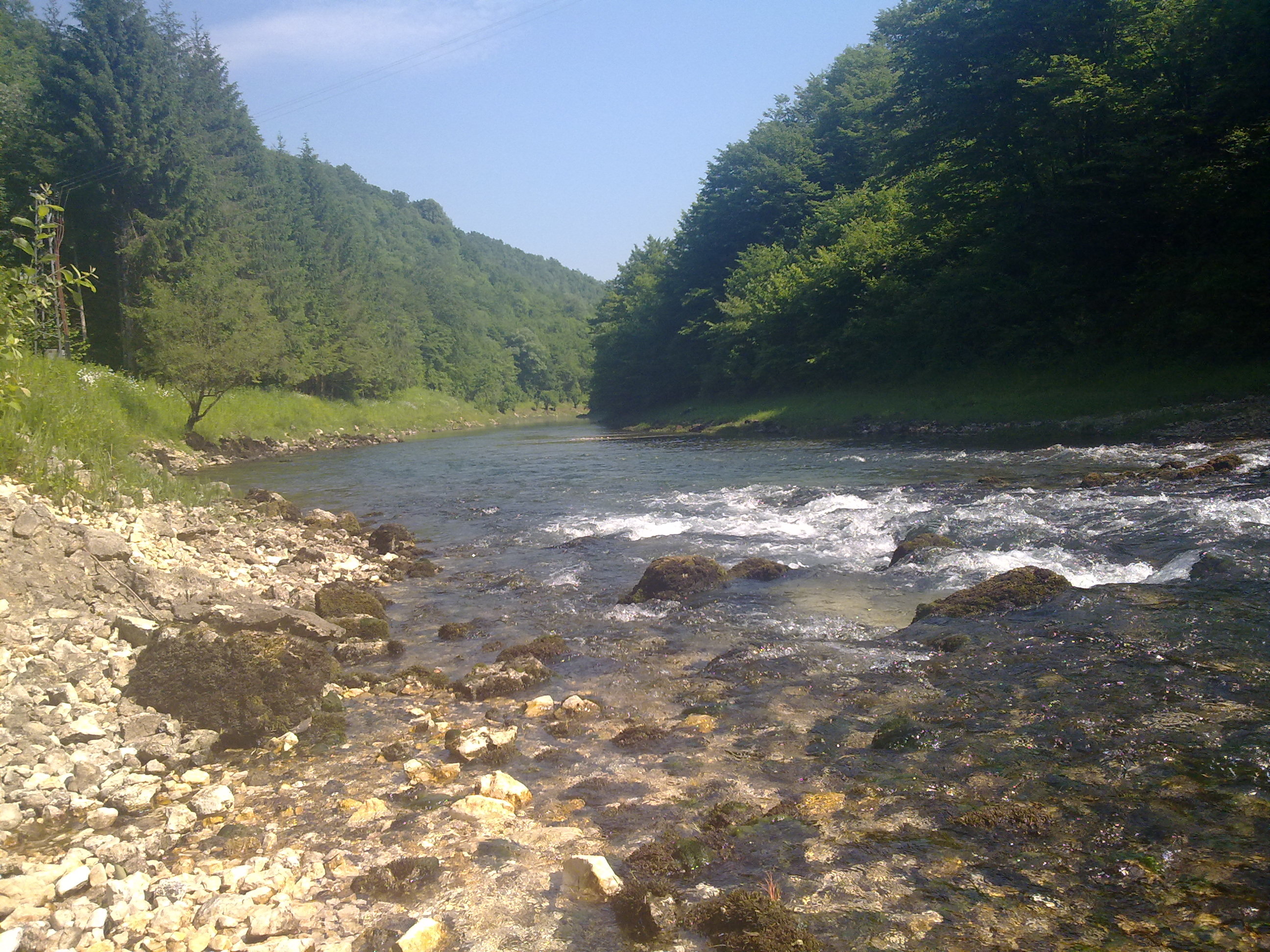
The Krušnica near Bosanska Krupa

== Economy ==
=== Hydropower ===
Due to the rivers's steep gradient, especially in the upper course, 942 MW of electrical energy could be produced if all the potential energy of the watershed was used, and currently, less than 1% of the river's hydroelectric potential is put into use. There have been multiple hydropower projects drafted to use the potential energy of the rivers biggest waterfalls and canyons, but they were met with fierce resistance from the local and international communities due to fear of the destruction of the river's natural and cultural heritage.

Currently, there are only three smaller hydroelectric powerplants in the river's watershed: the small Bihać and Krušnica hydroelectric plants, and the larger Una Kostela plant.

The small Bihać hydroelectric power plant is located near the city center, with the machine room being located at the end of a 1,000 m-long (3,300 ft) intake channel, taking water from the river near the city park. It was constructed in 1912. during the Austro - Hungarian rule in Bosnia, together with the electrical network of the city. The old defensive moat of the city was deepened, widened and repurposed as an intake channel for the power plant, utilizing the natural drop of the river. In its original form, it contained two Francis turbines with an installed power of 87 kW each and was used to power the city's electrical lighting. Today, it contains one generator with a power of 160 kW and a yearly electricity production of 400 MWh. It has a hydraulic head of 2.6 m and an intake capacity of 9 m^{3}/s. The water is directed into the intake by a low, 70 m-long (230 ft) concrete dam, colloquially called "beton" (bos. concrete), that doubles as a walkway and bathing site during low water levels. During high water levels, excess water flows over the dam forming a long waterfall. The power plant along with all other related structures was in 2011. declared to be a national monument of Bosnia and Herzegovina.

The Krušnica hydroelectric powerplant is located near the source of the Krušnica river near Bosanska Krupa and was, like the Bihać power plant, build during the Austro-Hungarian rule in Bosnia, in 1911. It has an installed capacity of 460 kW and a yearly electricity production of 400 MWh.

The Una Kostela hydroelectric power plant is located 9 km downstream of Bihać, near the village of Kostela. It is a run-of-the river plant that diverts a large part of the flow to be used for power generation and leaves behind a minimum amount of water to flow over the old waterfalls. Construction of the powerplant was finished in 1952. during the Yugoslav period. The powerplant contains four Kaplan turbines that use 16 m^{3}/s of water each for a total of 64 m^{3}/s. It has a hydraulic head of 12 m as the powerplant was constructed at the site of a large cascade of waterfalls. The installed capacity of each turbine is 2.35 MW for a grand total of 9.40 MW.

Even though there are two hydroelectric powerplants constructed on the main course of the river, the river flow can still be classified as uninterrupted because the powerplants do not divert all the water to be used for power generation.

=== Tourism ===
The entire watershed of the river has a very large potential for the development of tourism. Notable areas include the upper section of the river, with the Una National Park and its waterfalls, the cities of Bihać and Bosanska Krupa and the surrounding countryside. The tourism sector experiences steady growth, and the number of visitors to the national park has increased every year since its founding in 2008.

==== Rafting ====
Rafting is one of the most popular form of outdoor recreation in Bosnia and Herzegovina, and is important part of the national park offer for the river Una.

==== Fly fishing and angling ====
The river Una as well as the Unac are popular fly fishing grounds, and among the largest in Europe. An abundant ichthyofauna, rich in salmonid species, primarily grayling and brown trout, with the Una being also famous huchen destinations. Fly fishing and other angling methods are allowed only in certain sections and under strict rules and regulations of the national park services. This also applies on most tributaries, especially the Unac, Krušnica, and Klokot, while the Krka, like most of the Unac watercourse within the National Park, is completely excluded from all water and underwater activities.

== Flora and fauna ==
Over 170 types of medicinal herbs grow by the Una River; a rare plant called Campanula unensis, the "Una bluebell", was named after the River Una's bright turquoise and green colors.

=== Ichthyofauna ===
Twenty eight (28) species of fish live in the Una river, the biggest of which is the huchen (mladica, Latin: Hucho hucho). The river is rich in salmonid fish species, where as the healthy population of endemic huchen, otherwise globally endangered, makes the river Una and its main tributary the Sana, one of Europe's primer habitats and spawning grounds. Other smaller tributaries are also important for this fish, as it enters smaller stream during spawning season to lay eggs.

== Cities and towns ==
=== Bihać ===
Bihać is the largest and most important city located on the banks of the Una river and is the administrative center of the Una-Sana Canton in the Federation of Bosnia and Herzegovina and is the center of the Bihać municipality itself. The city itself has a population of 39 690, and the municipality has a population of 56 261. The Una National Park is almost completely located in the Bihać municipality, along with some of the largest waterfalls, canyons, cascades and tourist attractions. Some of the settlements on the Una river in the Bihać municipality are Martin Brod, Kulen Vakuf, Lohovo, Ripač, Pritoka, Golubić and Ostrožac na Uni.

The river enters the city from the south after having formed the large Ribićka otoka island. It continues to flow north towards the Alija Izetbegović bridge and passes by the Midžića jezero lake. The first cascade in the city is located at the end of the low concrete dam of the hydroelectric power plant. After flowing under the bridge, it continues to flow north where it forms the Gradska otoka island. The island is accessible by two pedestrian bridges connecting it to both banks of the river, and another pedestrian bridge connecting it to the smaller Amerikančevo island. After Gradska otoka island, the river splits into multiple smaller channels and forms multiple islands, some of which are private property and are connected to the mainland by bridges and some of which are wild, uninhabited islands. Two additional cascades are located in this stretch. After the individual channels combine, the water flows over a large, V-shaped cascade, after which the river splits into two channels again, forming another island. There are cascades on both sides of the island. The western one is a popular fishing and fly fishing spot and the location where the water flows out of the hydroelectric power plant, and the one on the eastern side is a popular bathing site. After the island, the river channels combine again and the water flows under the second large bridge in the city, the Bakšaiš bridge. After the bridge, the river forms multiple cascades before splitting into two channels again and forming the large Bakšaš island, after which the two channels combine again before forming another large set of river islands called Jotanovi otoci or simply Jotani. The last large cascades in the city are located here. After Jotani islands, the river flows under an old pedestrian bridge just before its confluence with the Klokot river.

=== Bosanska Krupa ===
Bosanska Krupa is the largest town in the Bosanska Krupa municipality in the Una-Sana Canton and the administrative center of said municipality. The town has a population of 10 196, and the municipality has a population of 25 545. Another large settlement on the banks of the river in the municipality is the town of Bosanska Otoka. The river enters the town from the west, just after having exited its large canyon, and continues to flow through the city, turning north. The river, just like in Bihać, forms multiple cascades and smaller islands connected by bridges. Downstream of Bosanska Krupa, the Krušnica river flows into the Una

=== Novi Grad ===
Novi Grad is the largest town in the Novi Grad municipality in Republika Srpska and the administrative center of said municipality. The town has a population of 10 120, and the municipality has a population of 27 115. The river enters the town from the southwest and after exiting the town continues to flow northeast. The confluence of the Una and its largest tributary, the Sana, is located in the town itself, and the town also divides the middle and lower portions of the river.

=== Kostajnica ===
Main articles: Kostajnica and Hrvatska Kostajnica

Kostajnica and Hrvatska Kostajnica are two towns on opposing banks of the river, in Bosnia and Croatia respectively. Novi Grad is the largest town in the Novi Grad municipality in Republika Srpska and the administrative center of said municipality. The town has a population of 3 834, and the municipality has a population of 5 977. The river enters the towns from the west and after exiting the town continues to flow east. Hrvatska Kostajnica is the largest town in the Hrvatska Kostajnica municipality in the Sisačko-moslavačka županija and the administrative center of said municipality. The town has a population of 2 746.

=== Kozarska Dubica ===
Novi Grad is the largest town in the Novi Grad municipality in Republika Srpska and the administrative center of said municipality. The town has a population of 10 544, and the municipality has a population of 21 524. The river enters the town from the west and after exiting the town continues to flow northeast.

== Environmental issues ==
The Una river, with the quality of its waters, unique landscape, rare tufa deposits and waterfalls, rapids, river islands and other aesthetic, geomorphological, hydrological and biological characteristics represents a unique environment in need of protection. The largest current threats to the river and its ecosystem are pollution and proposed hydropower projects.

=== Pollution ===
The upper section of the river is, for now, still a relatively untouched and unpolluted part of the river. The main pre-war pollutants, such as the cellulose factory in Drvar and the glue factory in Srb, have stopped operating after the war, and as such the water quality is satisfactory. Currently there are still multiple locations where raw, untreated sewage still flows into the river, and a large part of the sewage system of some of the cities on the river was destroyed during the war, worsening the problem. A current problem is also the exploitation of forests on the river banks and the exploitation of sand and clay from the riverbed, which could lead to erosion that could affect the river basin and the river itself. The Unac river is prone to sudden increases of discharge and water level, which could also lead to additional erosion.

In the cities and towns located on the river banks, most of the local population lacks any sort of ecological consciousness, which, combined with the lack of public trash cans and the ongoing migrant crisis, leads to a large amount of trash being thrown onto the river banks and into the river itself. Commons sites where large amounts of trash can be found are bathing sites, especially more obscure ones, the intake of the hydroelectric power plant in Bihać, publicly accessible river islands, and the shallower parts of the river. Completely destroyed trash cans, park benches and vandalized bridges are not an uncommon sight, especially in more obscure, badly lit parts of the cities. Some of the vandalized bridges on the river even required complete reconstruction.

Another large but often overlooked issue is the fact that there are multiple illegal landfills located in the watershed of the river, most notable in the Una-Sana canton. Some of the landfills are located directly above spring which feed directly into the river itself. To this date, there have been no solutions to the problem as the government of the Una-Sana canton is unable to properly organize and find a suitable location for a canton-level landfill.

=== Hydropower projects ===
There have been multiple hydropower projects proposed on the rivers itself and its tributaries, including the large Unac, Vrhpolje and Ključ hydroelectric power plants, and the smaller Štrbački buk power plant. There have also been multiple proposals for smaller mini hydroelectric power plants along the smaller tributaries, such as the Dobrenica. Some of those power plants, like the Unac power plant, would have large dams that would flood attractive canyons while other would divert a large portion of river's water to a machine room several kilometers downstream, leaving large parts of the riverbed dry. All of those proposals were met with fierce resistance from the local and international communities for fear of the destruction of the river's unique environment and, eventually, were cancelled.

== Gallery ==
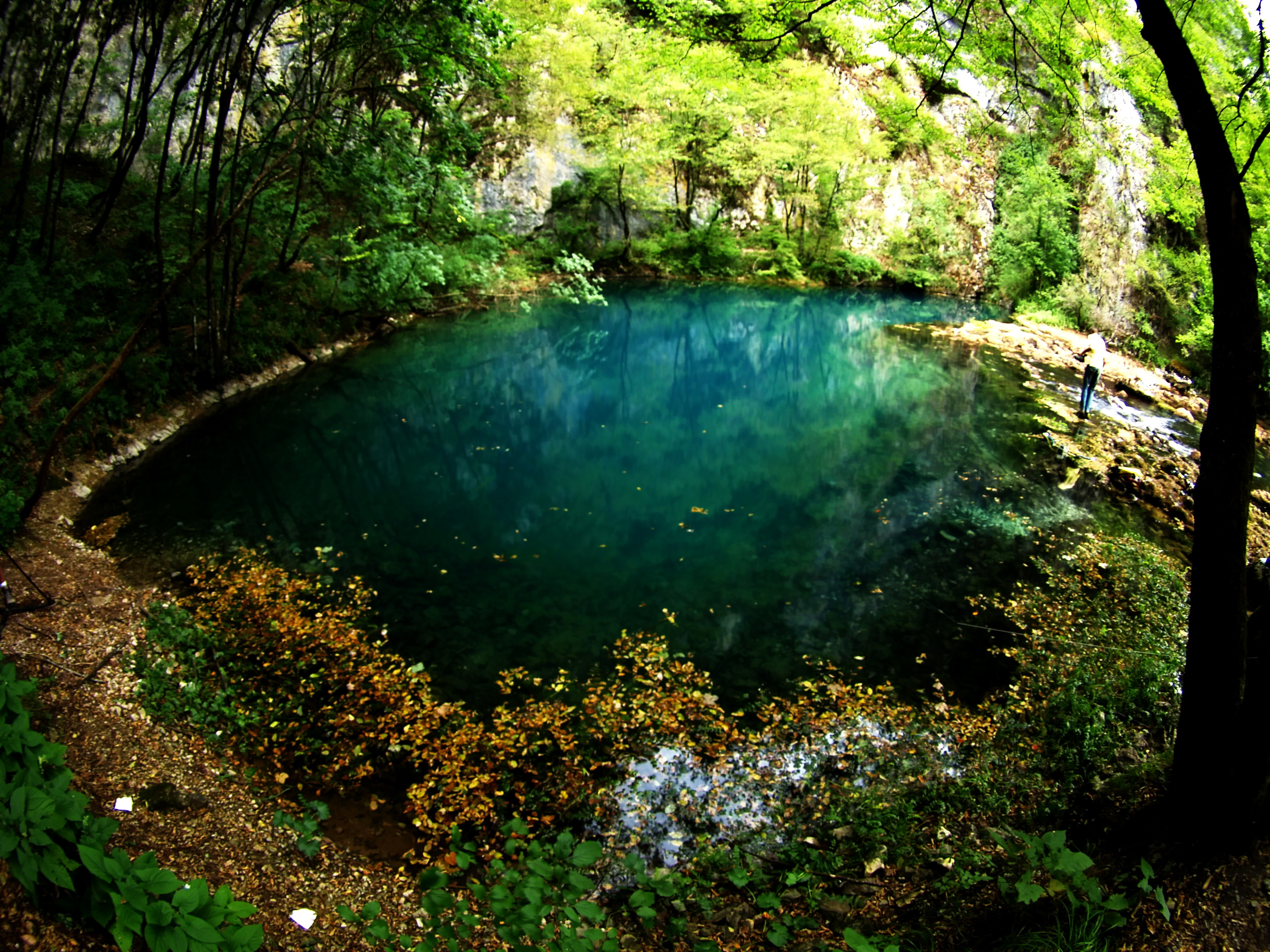
The spring of the Una

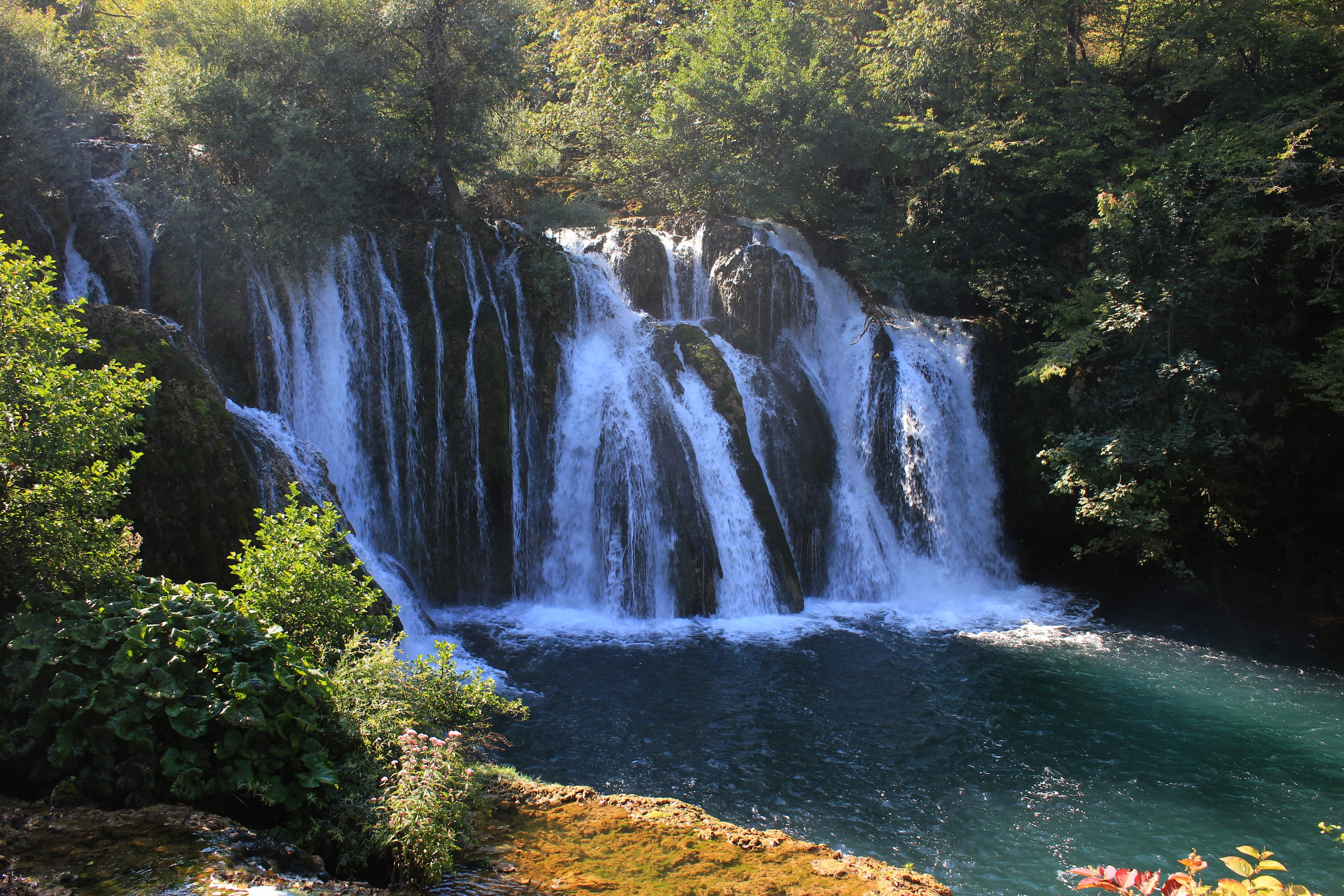
The Una in Martin Brod

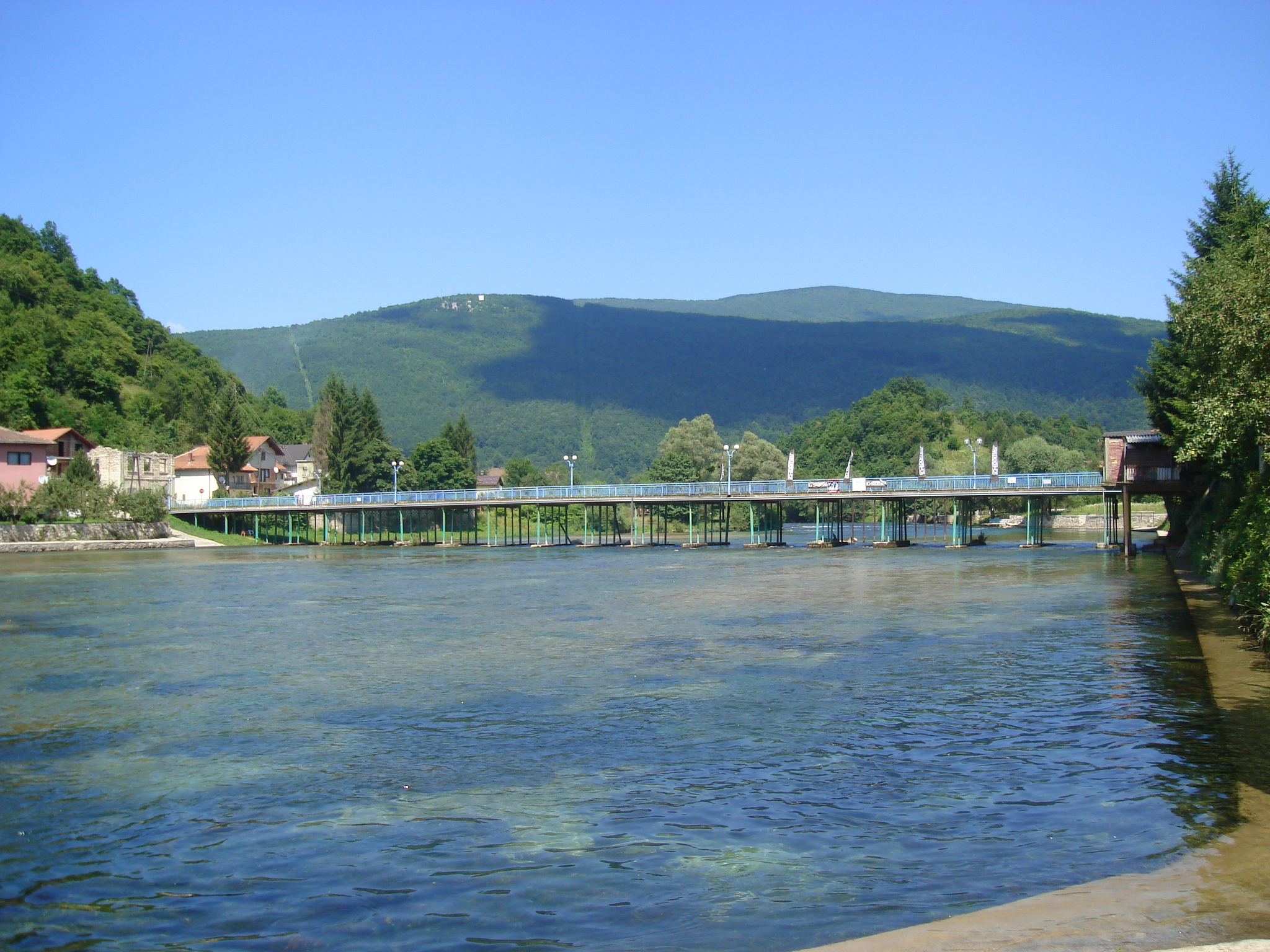
The Una in Kulen Vakuf

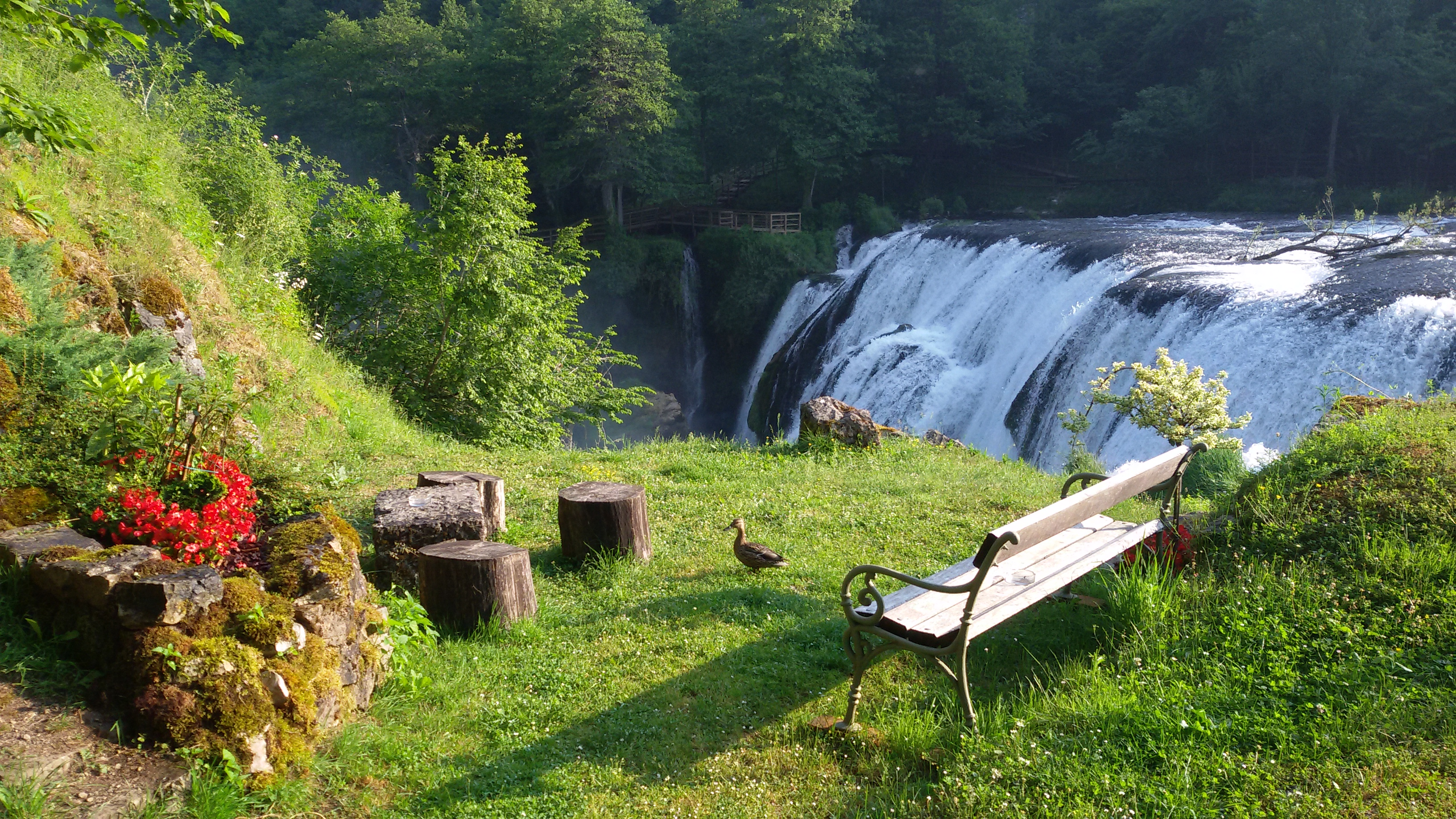
The Štrbački Buk viewed from Croatia

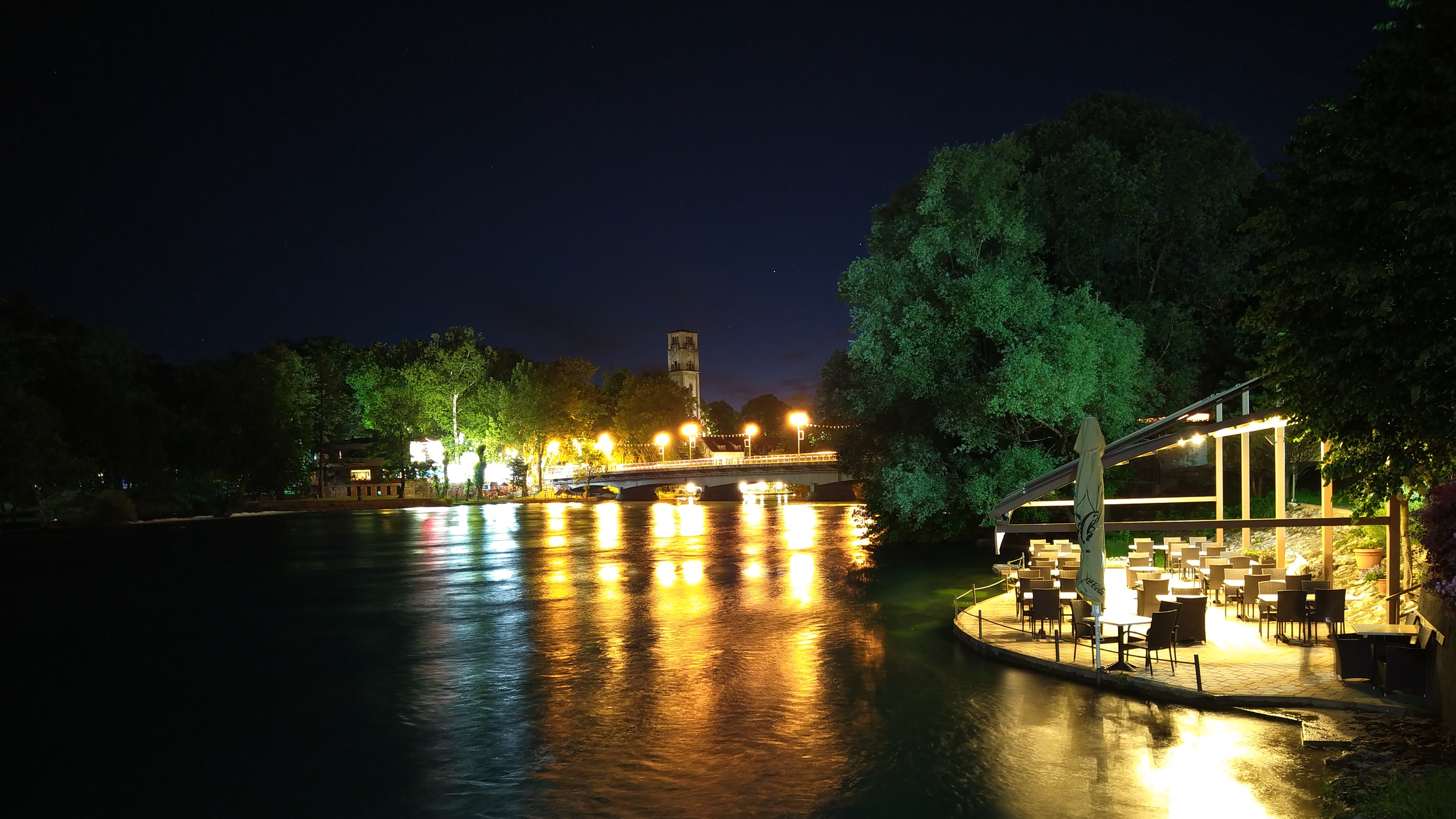
The Una in Bihać at night

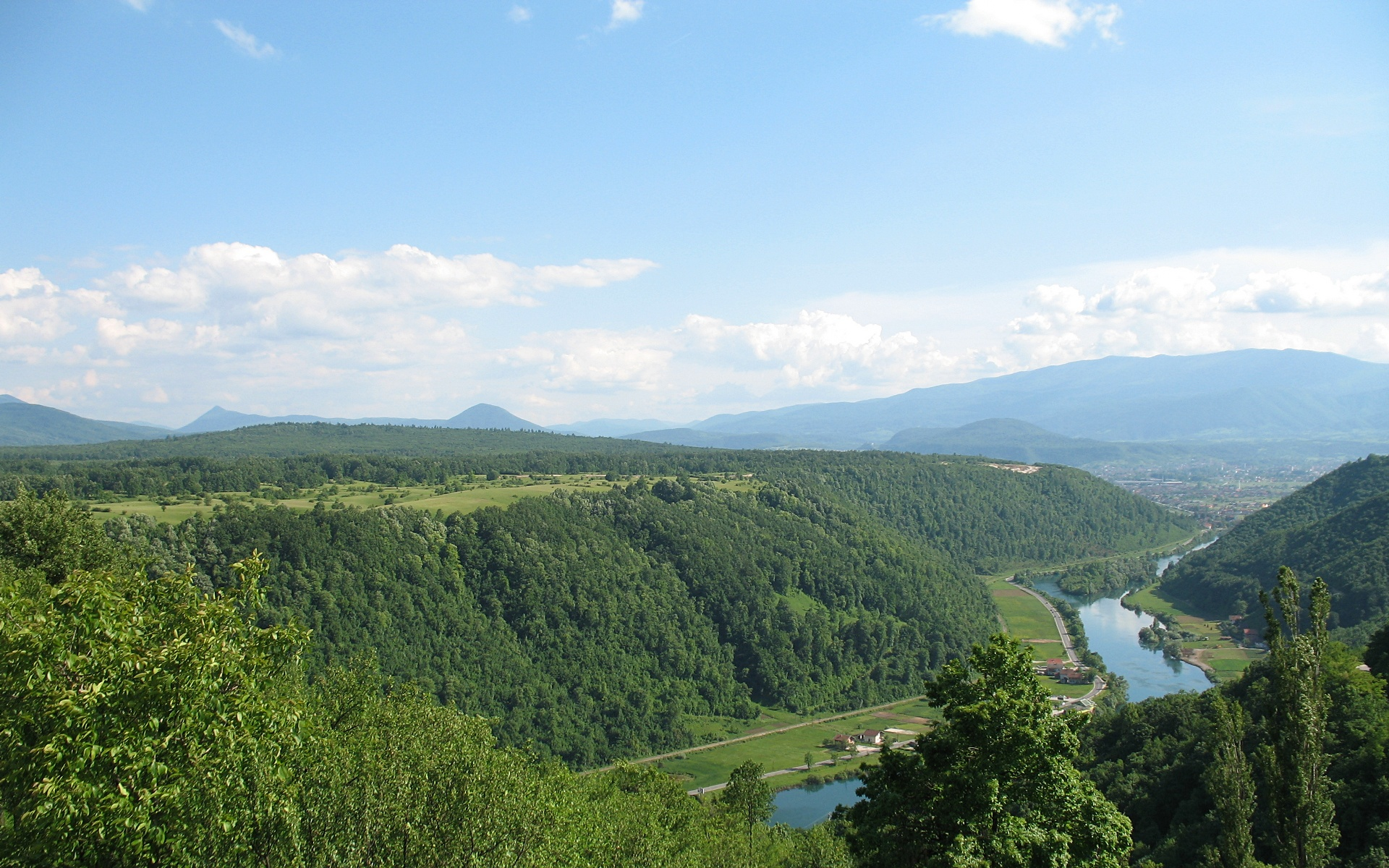
The Una river canyon

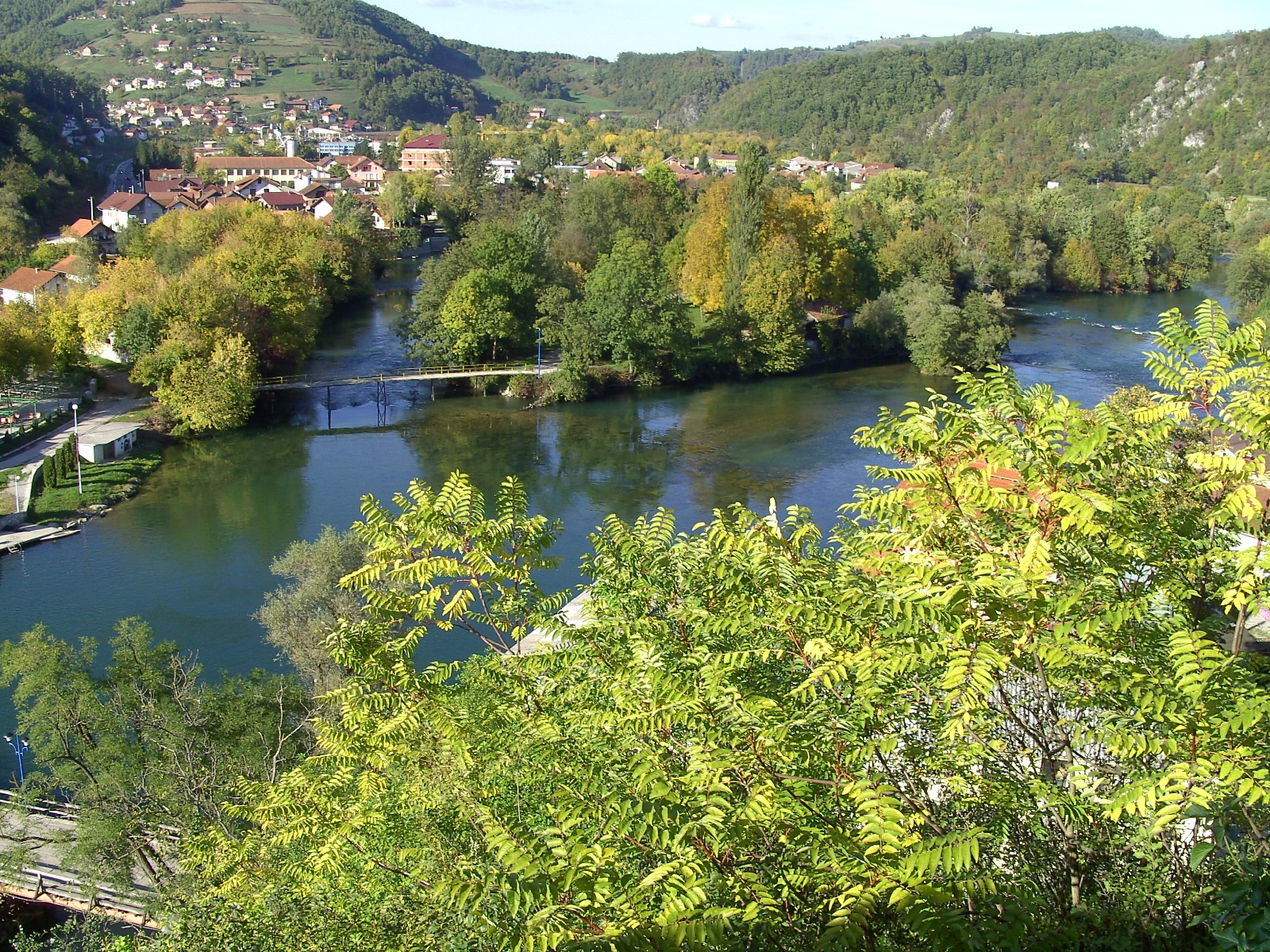
The Una in Bosanska Krupa

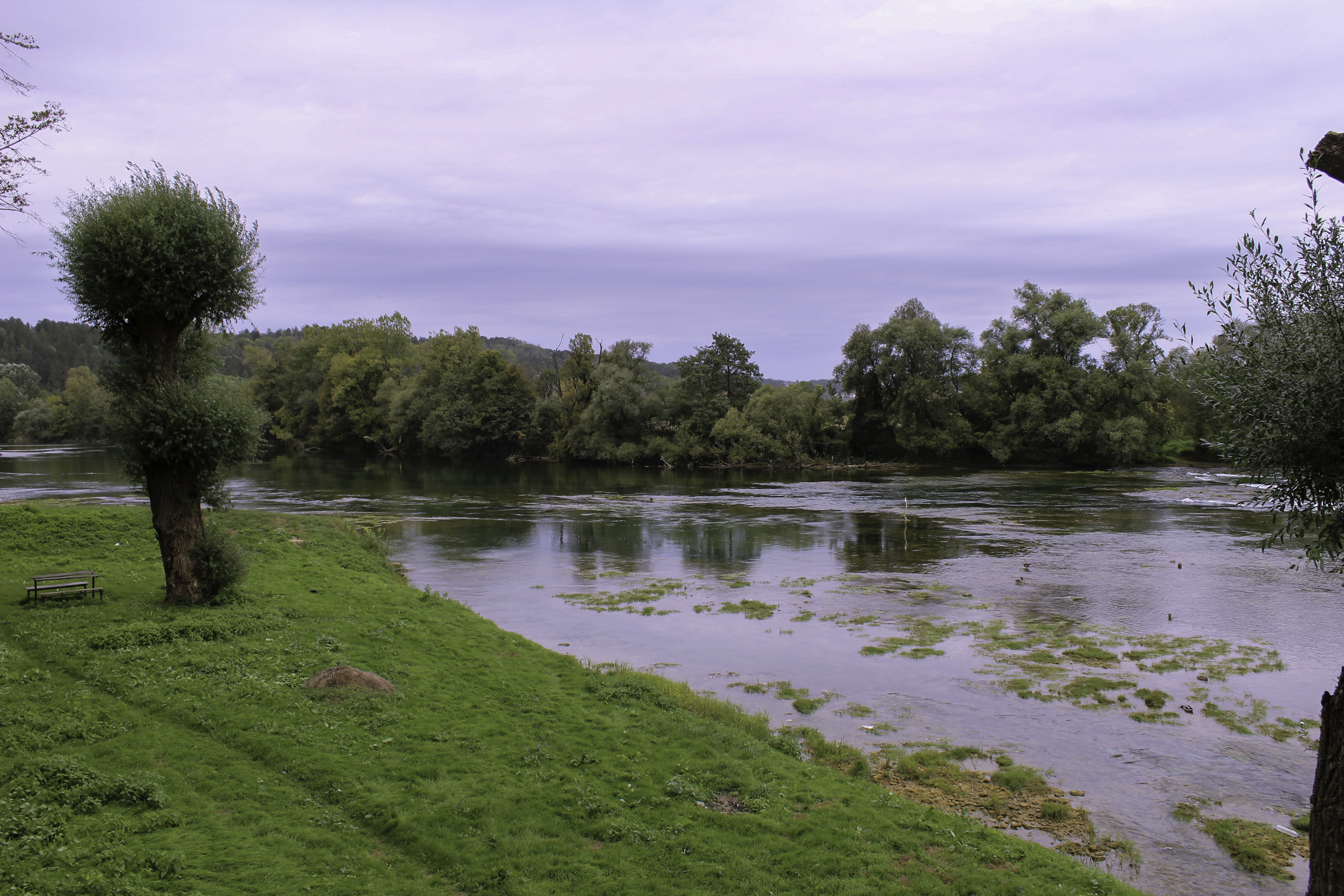
The Una in Bosanski Novi

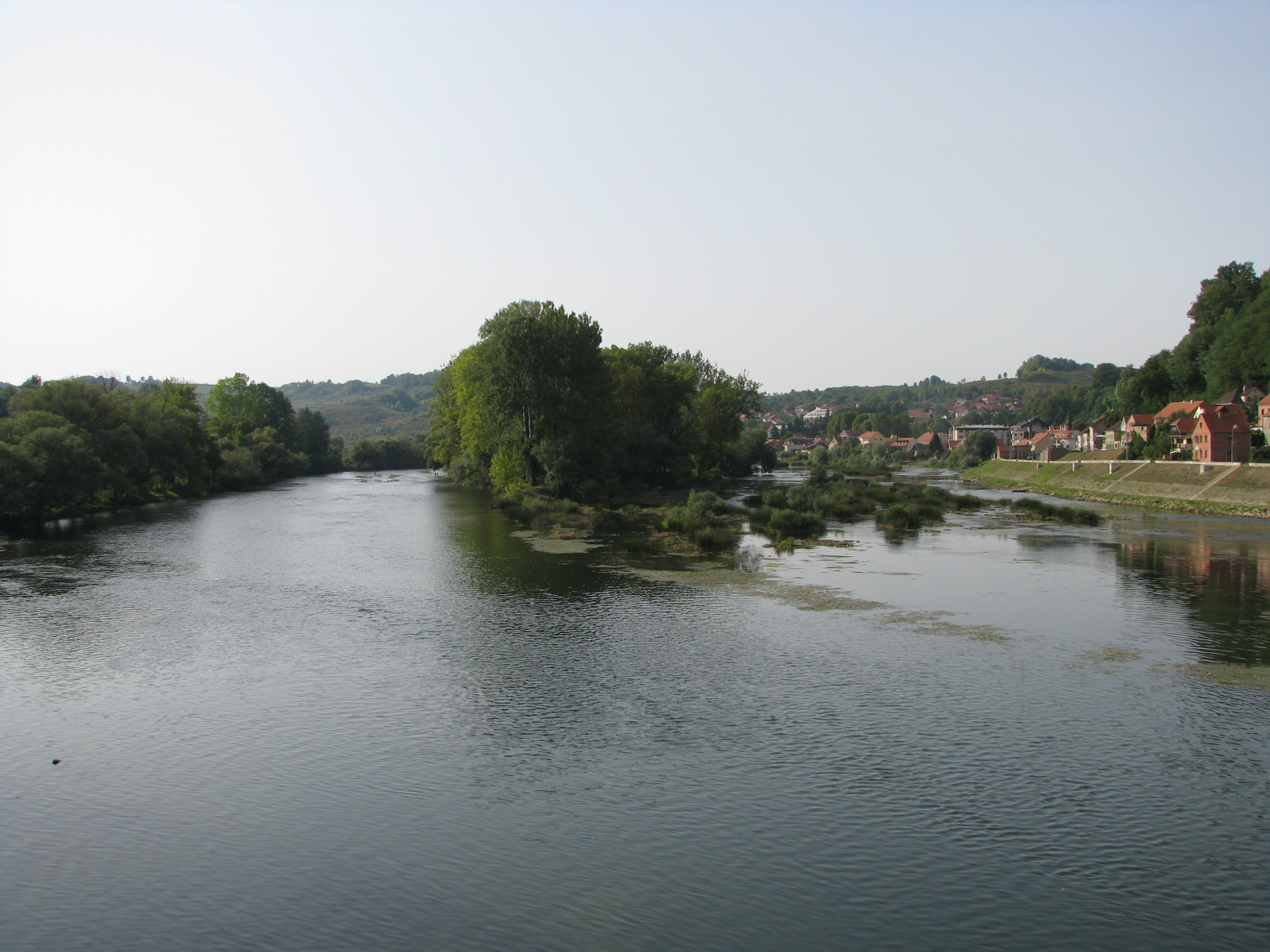
The Una in Hrvatska Kostajnica
