= Donji Štrbci =

Donji Štrbci Доњи Штрбци (Serbian)
- Village
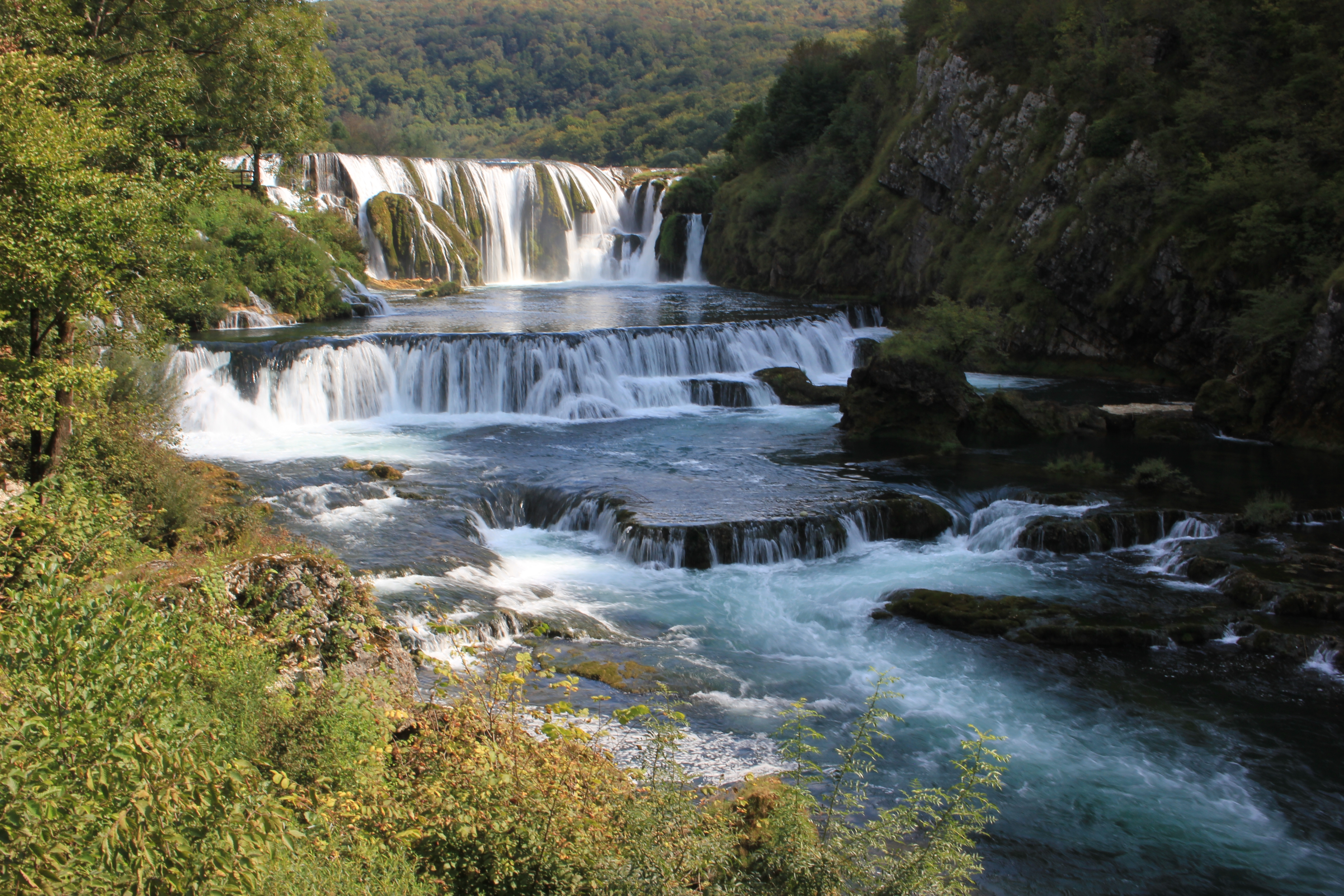
- Donji Štrbci, Štrbački buk
- Interactive map of Donji Štrbci
- Location within Croatia
- Coordinates: 44°39′07″N 15°59′58″E
- Country: Croatia
- County: Lika-Senj
- Municipality: Donji Lapac

Area
  - Total: 7.3 km^{2} (2.8 sq mi)
- Elevation: 519 m (1,703 ft)

Population (2021)
  - Total: 7
  - Density: 0.96/km^{2} (2.5/sq mi)
- Time zone: UTC+1 (CET)
  - Summer (DST): UTC+2 (CEST)
- Postal code: 53251 Nebljusi
- Area code: +385 (53)

Donji Štrbci (Serbian Cyrillic: Доњи Штрбци) is a village in Croatia.

== Population ==
According to the 2011 census, Donji Štrbci had 14 inhabitants.

Population
1857	1869	1880	1890	1900	1910	1921	1931	1948	1953	1961	1971	1981	1991	2001	2011
107	128	120	168	233	323	293	0	272	284	225	149	99	50	25	14

Note: In 1857 and 1869 this settlement was part of Bosnia and Herzegovina (that time Ottoman Empire), without census data, so population number is calculated. 1880, 1890 and 1900 data are taken from Bosnia and Herzegovina censuses (under occupation control of Austria-Hungary) from 1879, 1885 and 1895. There is also non-included data for settlement which became part of the Yugoslav federal unit of Bosnia and Herzegovina before the 1948 census. From 1880-1931 name of the settlement was Štrbci, in 1948 Bosanski Štrbci, and since 1953 Donji Štrbci. In 1931 data is included in the settlement of Nebljusi. Settlement of Donji Štrbci became part of that time yugoslav federal unit of Croatia after World War II.

=== 1991 census ===
According to the 1991 census, settlement of Donji Štrbci had 50 inhabitants, which were ethnically declared as this:

Donji Štrbci
1991
total: 50
1. Serbs 47 (94.0%)
2. Yugoslavs 3 (6.00%)

=== Austro-hungarian 1910 census ===
According to the 1910 census, settlement of Donji Štrbci had 323 inhabitants, which were linguistically and religiously declared as this:

Population by language	Croatian or Serbian
Štrbci	323
Total	323 (100%)

Population by religion	Eastern Orthodox
Štrbci	323
Total	323 (100%)

Note: In 1910 census settlement of Donji Štrbci was in Bosnia and Herzegovina.

== Literature ==
- Savezni zavod za statistiku i evidenciju FNRJ i SFRJ, popis stanovništva 1948, 1953, 1961, 1971, 1981. i 1991. godine.
- Knjiga: "Narodnosni i vjerski sastav stanovništva Hrvatske, 1880-1991: po naseljima, author: Jakov Gelo, izdavač: Državni zavod za statistiku Republike Hrvatske, 1998., ISBN 953-6667-07-X, ISBN 978-953-6667-07-9;
