= Gurk =

Gurk may refer to:

- Gurk (river), in Austria
- Gurk, Carinthia, a town in Austria
- Eduard Gurk (1801–1841), Austrian painter
- Krka (Sava) (German: Gurk), a river in Slovenia
- Roman Catholic Diocese of Gurk, in Austria

== See also ==
- Krka (disambiguation)
