= Štrbački buk =

Coordinates: 44°39′28″N 16°00′17″E

- Штрбачки бyк
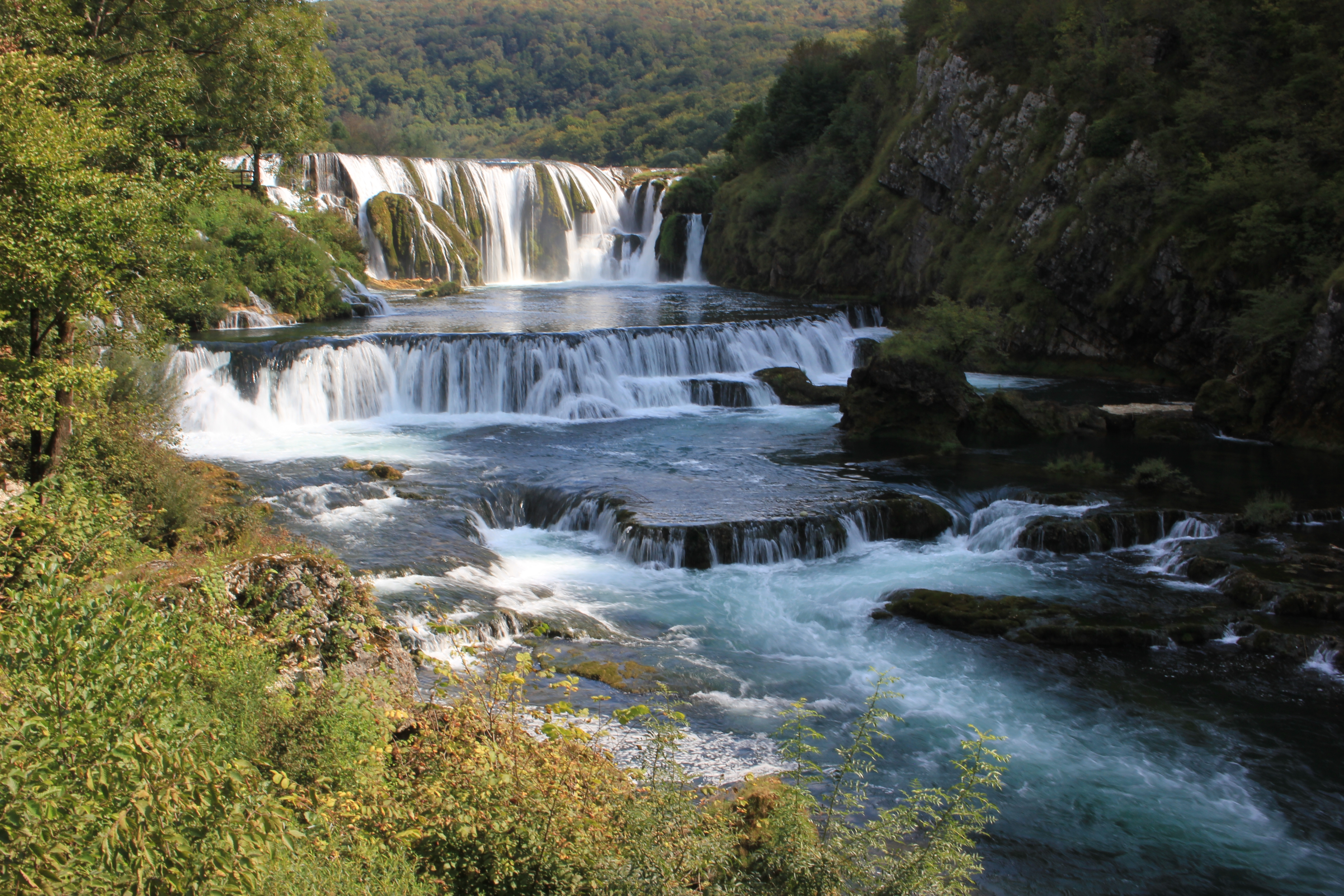
- Interactive map of Štrbački buk
- Elevation: 296 metres (971 ft)
- Total height: 25 metres (82 ft)
- Watercourse: Una River

Štrbački buk (Serbian Cyrillic: Штрбачки бyк) waterfall is a 25m high waterfall on the Una River (296m altitude). It is situated on the border of Croatia and Bosnia and Herzegovina, south of Doljani and Bihać and north of Donji Štrbci and Donji Lapac.

It is the highest waterfall in Una National Park, and Lonely Planet described it as "A strong contender for the title of the nation's most impressive waterfall".

== See also ==
- List of waterfalls
