= Krka (Una) =

River between Bosnia and Croatia

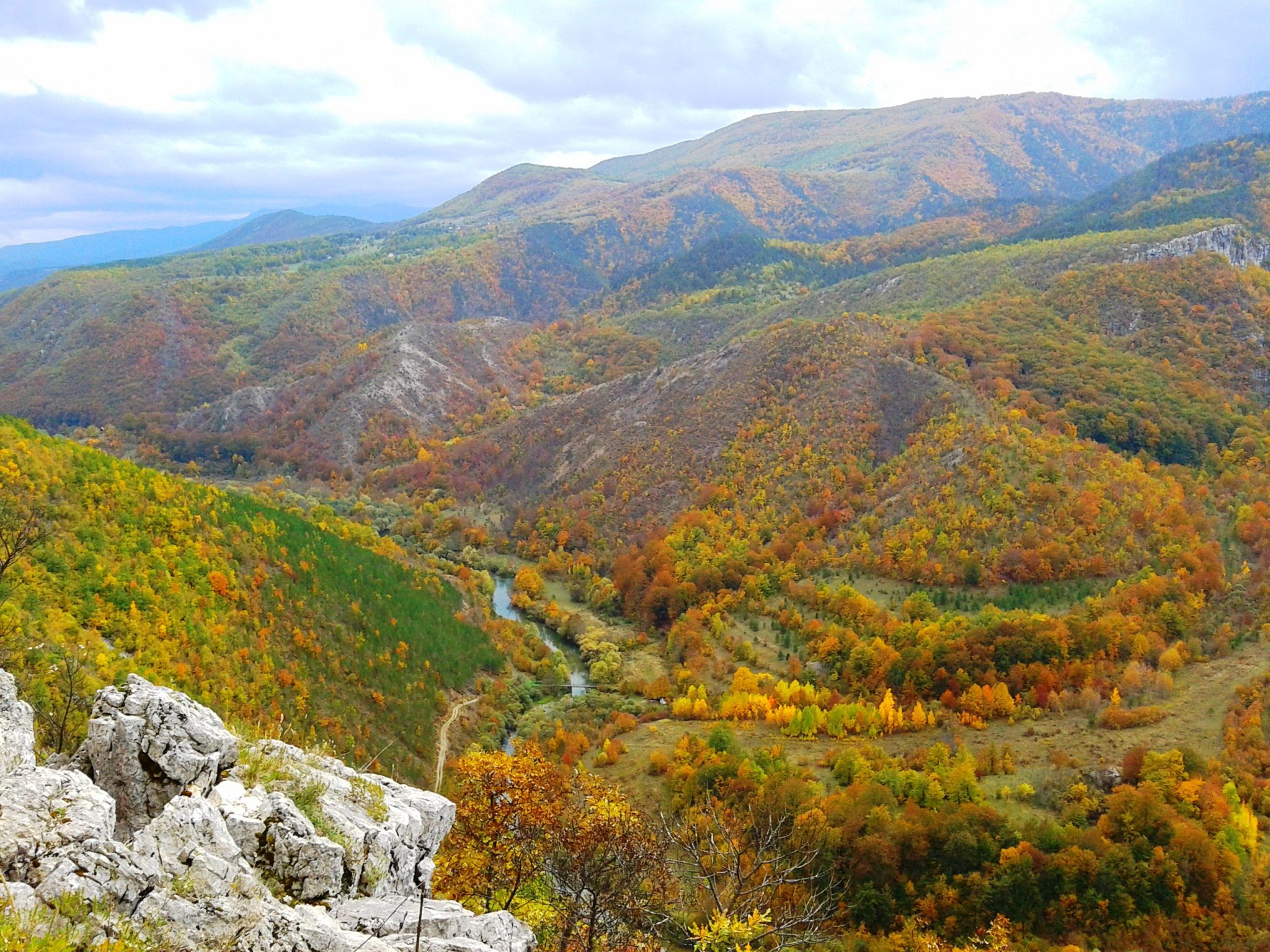
- Canyon of the Krka river

- Location within Bosnia and Herzegovina

Location
- Country: Bosnia and Herzegovina

Physical characteristics
- Source
  - location: Mali Cvijetinić
  - coordinates: 44.4024455°N 16.1726797°E
- Mouth
  - location: Donji Grbići
  - coordinates: 44.4247123°N 16.1424243°E
- Length: 6 kilometres (3.7 mi)

Basin features
- Progression: Una→ Sava→ Danube→ Black Sea

The Krka (Serbian Cyrillic: Крка) river is a 6-kilometre-long (3.5 mi) long tributary of the Una river. It is a border river, constituting the natural border between Bosnia and Herzegovina and Croatia for about 5 km (3 miles) of its course. It is also an important natural feature of the Una National Park.

== Special Reserve Krka ==
The Krka's entire course together with its abounding wellspring is a part of the National Park Una, protected as a Special Reserve. The river rises at the foot of the specious plateau of Cvijetinić, with eponymous villages Veliki and Mali Cvjetnić. The Krka wellspring is karstic, characterized with large discharge, so that river itself is already formed and rich with water. Access to it through the canyon is cleared and marked but still quite demanding, and as part of tourist attraction it gives the possibility of full-day excursion through woods as well as barren karstic hills. The wellspring is in secluded valley, with an old mill is also still present.

== Fly fishing ==
Although the river Una as well as the Unac are popular fly fishing grounds, among the largest in Europe, rich in salmonid species, primarily grayling and brown trout, with the Una being one of the famous huchen destinations, fly fishing like all other angling methods is allowed only in certain section and under strict rules and regulations. Meanwhile, the Krka, like most of the Unac watercourse within the National Park, is completely excluded from all water and underwater activities.
