= Grljevići =

- Village
- Location within Bosnia and Herzegovina
- Country: Bosnia and Herzegovina
- Entity: Federation of Bosnia and Herzegovina
- Canton: West Herzegovina
- Municipality: Ljubuški

Area
  - Total: 4.75 sq mi (12.30 km^{2})

Population (2013)
  - Total: 315
  - Density: 66.3/sq mi (25.6/km^{2})
- Time zone: UTC+1 (CET)
  - Summer (DST): UTC+2 (CEST)

Grljevići is a village in the center of three municipalities: Ljubuški, Grude, and Široki Brijeg. The village consists of five smaller villages: Kordići, Čolaci, Zadre, Seve and Bunar and borders Borajna, Lipno, Rasno, and Vitina.

== Demographics ==
According to the 2013 census, its population was 315.

Ethnicity in 2013
Ethnicity	Number	Percentage
Croats	314	99.7%
Bosniaks	1	0.3%
Total	315	100%

== Famous residents ==
- Lucijan Kordić, writer
- Nikola Kordić, writer
- Predrag Kordić, writer, priest

== Sport ==
The MNK Grljevići Club participates in many football tournaments, but without much success. They reached their biggest success by winning 3rd place in tournament of populated places in Ljubuški district where they defeated Grab.
