= Radišići =

Radišići Радишићи
- Village
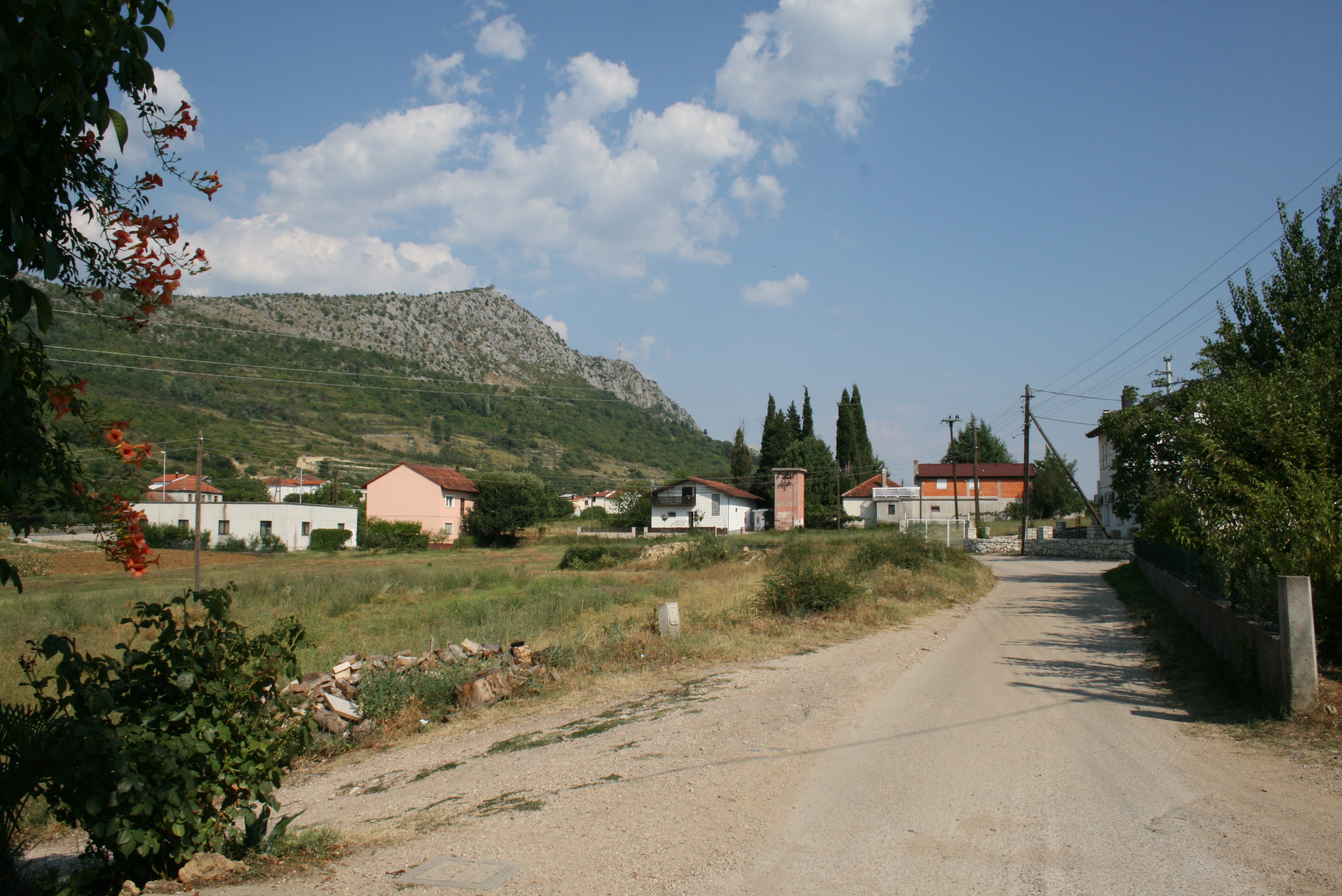

- Location within Bosnia and Herzegovina
- Coordinates: 43°13′19″N 17°32′35″E
- Country: Bosnia and Herzegovina
- Entity: Federation of Bosnia and Herzegovina
- Canton: West Herzegovina
- Municipality: Ljubuški

Area
  - Total: 6.80 sq mi (17.62 km^{2})

Population (2013)
  - Total: 2,363
  - Density: 347.3/sq mi (134.1/km^{2})
- Time zone: UTC+1 (CET)
  - Summer (DST): UTC+2 (CEST)

Radišići (Serbian: Радишићи) is a village in Bosnia and Herzegovina, in Ljubuški municipality of West Herzegovina Canton. According to 2013 census, it has 2,363 inhabitants, predominantly Croats (99,45%).

The first mention of the toponym Radišići dates back to 1585.

Radišići is among the biggest villages in Western Herzegowina, located between Ljubuški and Proboj, as a part of Zabiokovlje. Village belongs to Trebižat drainage basin.

== Demographics ==
According to the 2013 census, its population was 2,363.

Ethnicity in 2013
Ethnicity	Number	Percentage
Croats	2,350	99.4%
Serbs	5	0.2%
Bosniaks	4	0.2%
other/undeclared	5	0.2%
Total	2,363	100%

== Literature ==
- Šarac, Petar, Šarac, Stanko: Radišići u riječi i slici, Zagreb, 2011, ISBN 978-953-56707-0-4.
