= Crveni Grm =

- Village
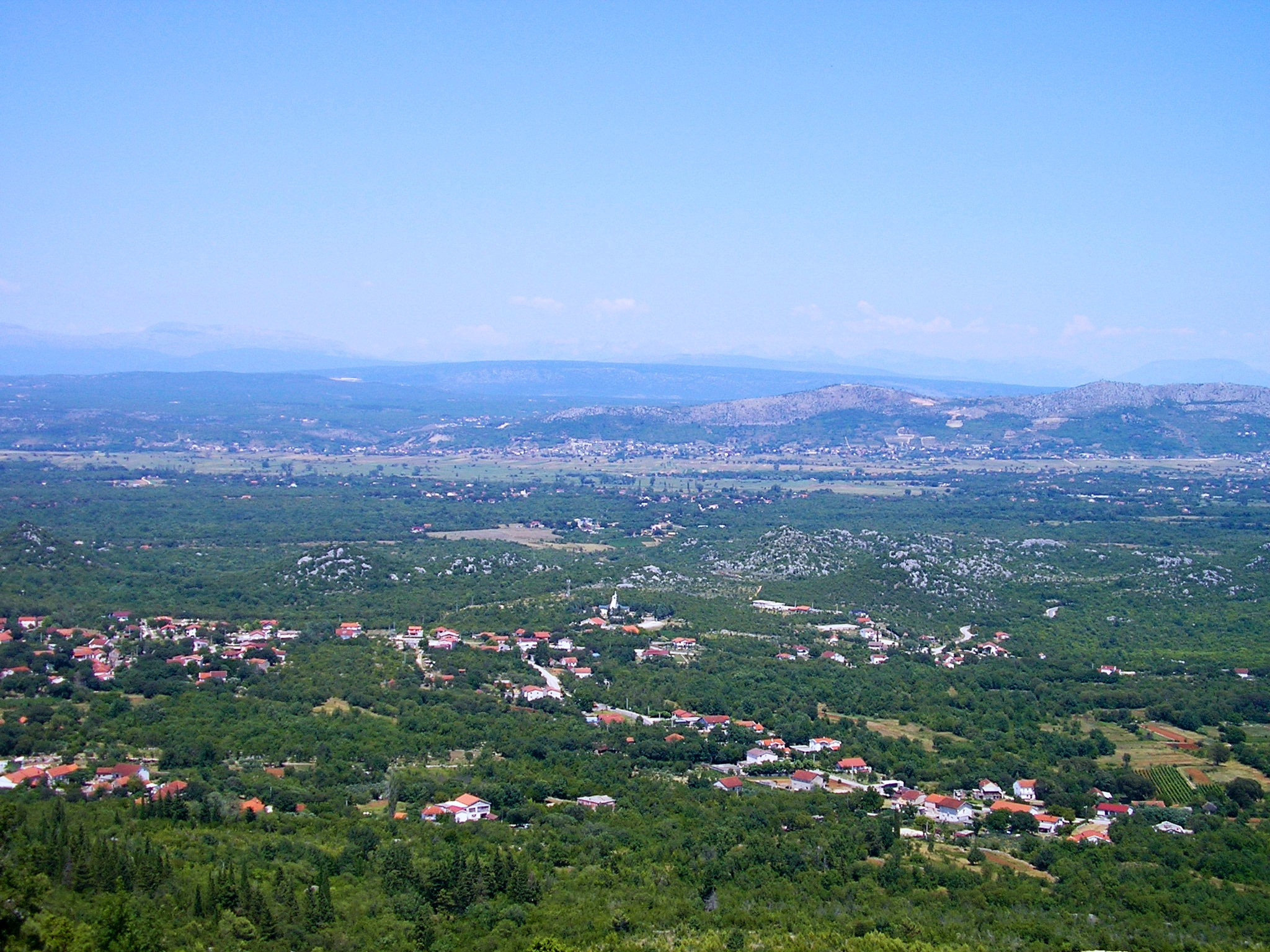

- Location within Bosnia and Herzegovina
- Coordinates: 43°10′N 17°29′E
- Country: Bosnia and Herzegovina
- Entity: Federation of Bosnia and Herzegovina
- Canton: West Herzegovina
- Municipality: Ljubuški

Area
  - Total: 4.57 sq mi (11.83 km^{2})

Population (2013)
  - Total: 885
  - Density: 194/sq mi (74.8/km^{2})
- Time zone: UTC+1 (CET)
  - Summer (DST): UTC+2 (CEST)

Crveni Grm ("Red Bush" in Croatian) is a village in Herzegovina, at the border with Croatia. It is located in the municipality of Ljubuški.

== Demographics ==
According to the 2013 census, its population was 885.

Ethnicity in 2013
Ethnicity	Number	Percentage
Croats	884	99.9%
Serbs	1	0.1%
Total	885	100%
