= Zvirići =

- Village
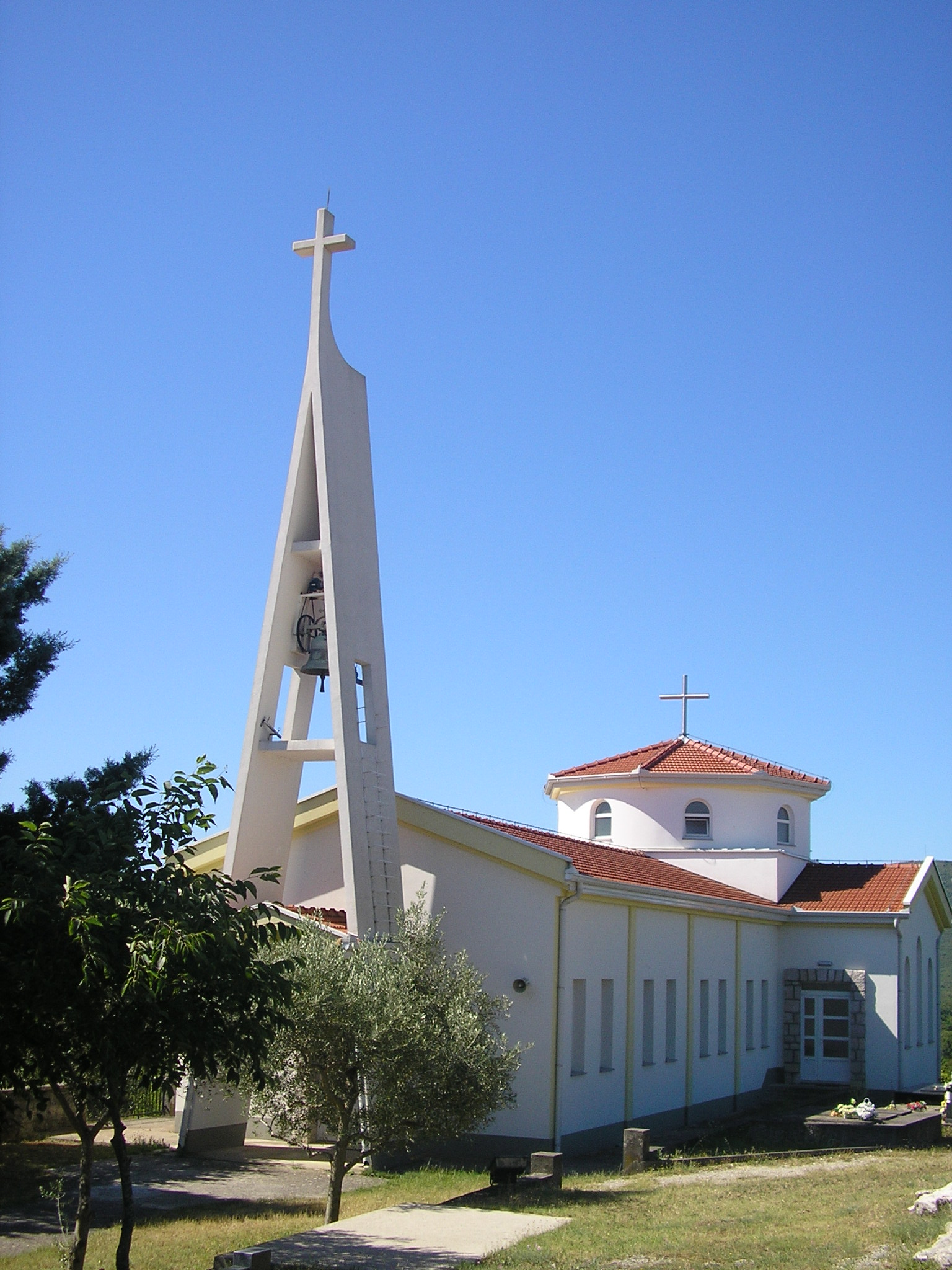
- All Saints church

- Location within Bosnia and Herzegovina
- Coordinates: 43°08′N 17°36′E
- Country: Bosnia and Herzegovina
- Entity: Federation of Bosnia and Herzegovina
- Canton: West Herzegovina
- Municipality: Ljubuški

Area
  - Total: 5.05 sq mi (13.08 km^{2})

Population (2013)
  - Total: 272
  - Density: 53.9/sq mi (20.8/km^{2})
- Time zone: UTC+1 (CET)
  - Summer (DST): UTC+2 (CEST)

Zvirići is a village in Bosnia and Herzegovina. According to the 1991 census, the village is located in the municipality of Ljubuški.

== Demographics ==
According to the 2013 census, its population was 272.

Ethnicity in 2013
Ethnicity	Number	Percentage
Croats	268	98.5%
Serbs	1	0.4%
other/undeclared	3	1.1%
Total	272	100%
