= Čeveljuša (waterfall) =

Čeveljuša Falls
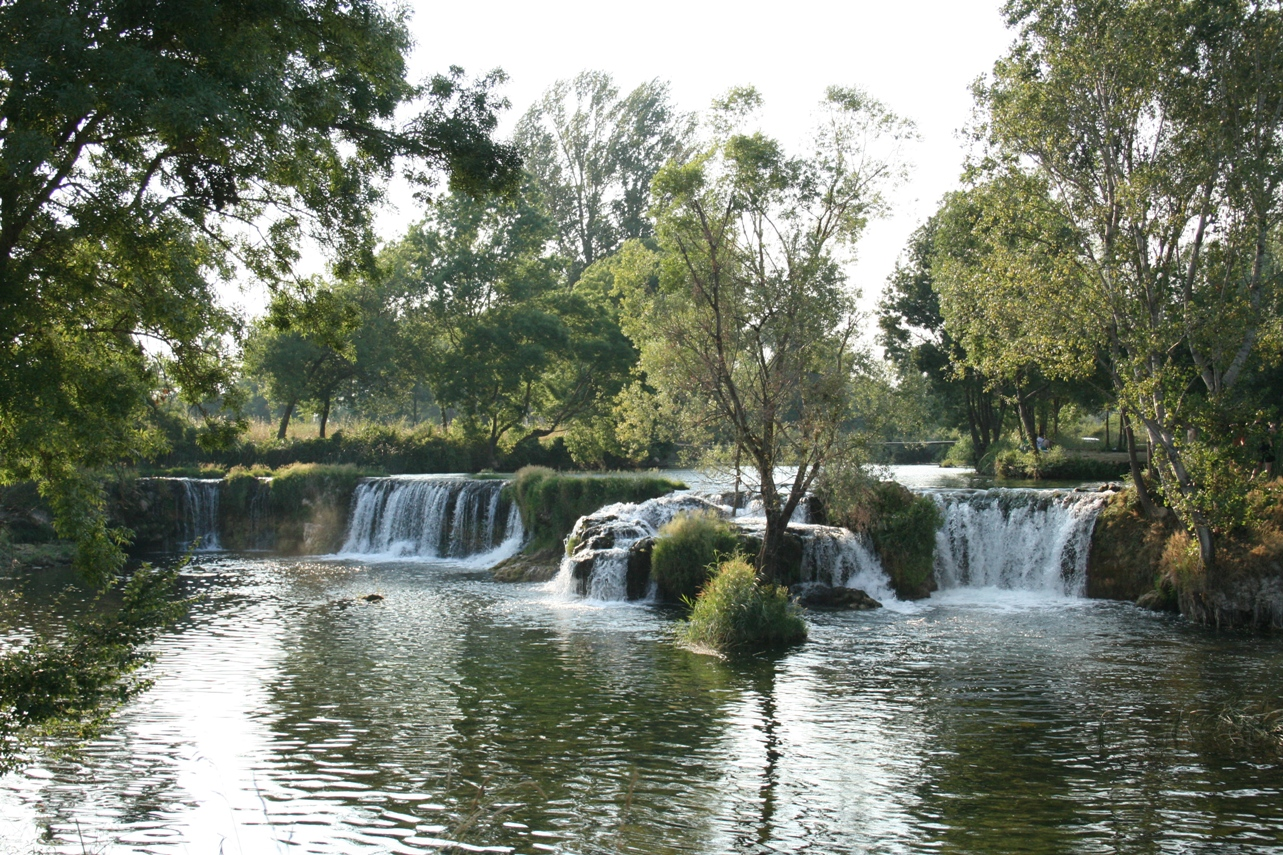
- Tufa barrier of Čeveljuša Falls is in its early stage of formation

- Location within Bosnia and Herzegovina
- Location: Ljubuški, Bosnia and Herzegovina
- Coordinates: 43.168271°N 17.555241°E
- Total height: 2.5 metres (8 ft 2 in)
- Watercourse: Trebižat

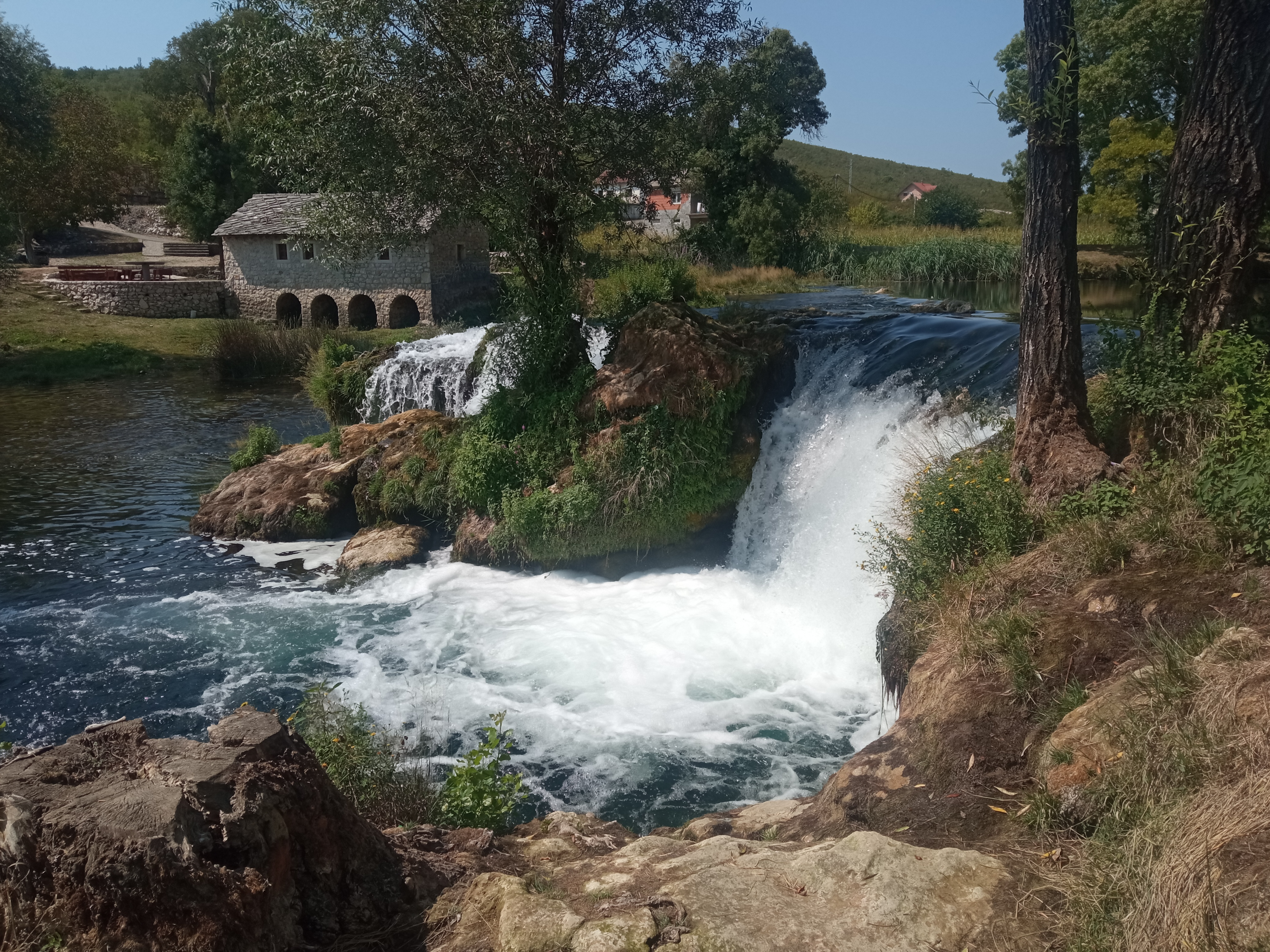
waterfall

Čeveljuša is a waterfall on the river Trebižat, located in village Hrašljani, several kilometers from Ljubuški, Bosnia and Herzegovina. Its height is about 2.5 metres (8 ft 2 in), and it is a popular tourist attraction and a place where locals gather during the summer months for swimming and relaxation.
