= Vojnići =

- Village
- Location within Bosnia and Herzegovina
- Coordinates: 43°16′N 17°25′E
- Country: Bosnia and Herzegovina
- Entity: Federation of Bosnia and Herzegovina
- Canton: West Herzegovina
- Municipality: Ljubuški

Area
  - Total: 2.98 sq mi (7.73 km^{2})

Population (2013)
  - Total: 576
  - Density: 193/sq mi (74.5/km^{2})
- Time zone: UTC+1 (CET)
  - Summer (DST): UTC+2 (CEST)

Vojnići (Serbian: Војнићи) is a village in Bosnia and Herzegovina. According to the 1991 census, the village is located in the municipality of Ljubuški.

== Demographics ==
According to the 2013 census, its population was 576, all Croats.
