= Greda, Ljubuški =

Greda
- Village
- Location within Bosnia and Herzegovina
- Coordinates: 43°14′06″N 17°32′23″E
- Country: Bosnia and Herzegovina
- Entity: Federation of Bosnia and Herzegovina
- Canton: West Herzegovina
- Municipality: Ljubuški

Area
  - Total: 1.29 sq mi (3.35 km^{2})

Population (2013)
  - Total: 115
  - Density: 88.9/sq mi (34.3/km^{2})
- Time zone: UTC+1 (CET)
  - Summer (DST): UTC+2 (CEST)

Greda is a village in Bosnia and Herzegovina. According to the 1991 census, the village is located in the municipality of Ljubuški.

== Demographics ==
According to the 2013 census, its population was 115, all Croats.
