= Crnopod =

- Village
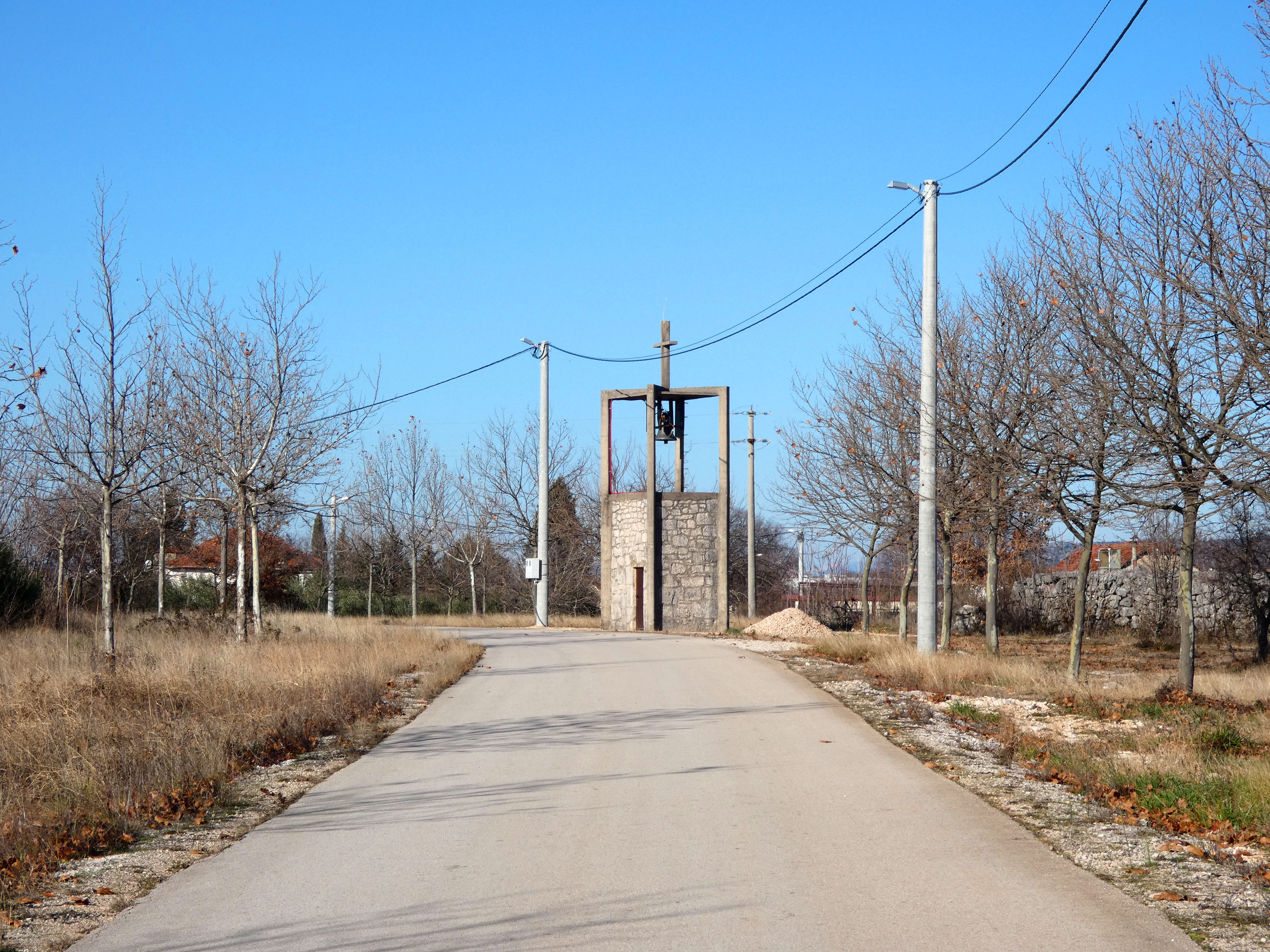

- Location within Bosnia and Herzegovina
- Coordinates: 43°11′N 17°37′E
- Country: Bosnia and Herzegovina
- Entity: Federation of Bosnia and Herzegovina
- Canton: West Herzegovina
- Municipality: Ljubuški

Area
  - Total: 1.38 sq mi (3.58 km^{2})

Population (2013)
  - Total: 180
  - Density: 130/sq mi (50/km^{2})
- Time zone: UTC+1 (CET)
  - Summer (DST): UTC+2 (CEST)

Crnopod is a village in Bosnia and Herzegovina. According to the 1991 census, the village is located in the municipality of Ljubuški.

== Demographics ==
According to the 2013 census, its population was 180.

Ethnicity in 2013
Ethnicity	Number	Percentage
Croats	179	99.4%
Serbs	1	0.6%
Total	180	100%
