= Pregrađe =

Pregrađe Преграђе
- Village
- Location within Bosnia and Herzegovina
- Coordinates: 43°11′11″N 17°33′44″E
- Country: Bosnia and Herzegovina
- Entity: Federation of Bosnia and Herzegovina
- Canton: West Herzegovina
- Municipality: Ljubuški

Area
  - Total: 1.27 sq mi (3.28 km^{2})

Population (2013)
  - Total: 861
  - Density: 680/sq mi (263/km^{2})
- Time zone: UTC+1 (CET)
  - Summer (DST): UTC+2 (CEST)

Pregrađe (Serbian: Преграђе) is a village in Bosnia and Herzegovina. According to the 1991 census, the village is located in the municipality of Ljubuški.

== Demographics ==
According to the 2013 census, its population was 861.

Ethnicity in 2013
Ethnicity	Number	Percentage
Croats	853	99.1%
Serbs	1	0.1%
other/undeclared	7	0.8%
Total	861	100%
