= Miletina =

Miletina Милетина
- Village
- Location within Bosnia and Herzegovina
- Coordinates: 43°11′21″N 17°38′58″E
- Country: Bosnia and Herzegovina
- Entity: Federation of Bosnia and Herzegovina
- Canton: West Herzegovina
- Municipality: Ljubuški

Area
  - Total: 2.17 sq mi (5.63 km^{2})

Population (2013)
  - Total: 376
  - Density: 173/sq mi (66.8/km^{2})
- Time zone: UTC+1 (CET)
  - Summer (DST): UTC+2 (CEST)

Miletina (Serbian: Милетина) is a village in Bosnia and Herzegovina. According to the 1991 census, the village is located in the municipality of Ljubuški. This village has a small river called Lukoc.

== Demographics ==
According to the 2013 census, its population was 376.

Ethnicity in 2013
Ethnicity	Number	Percentage
Croats	375	99.7%
Serbs	1	0.3%
Total	376	100%
