= Grab, Ljubuški =

Grab Граб
- Village
- Location within Bosnia and Herzegovina
- Coordinates: 43°13′01″N 17°27′04″E
- Country: Bosnia and Herzegovina
- Entity: Federation of Bosnia and Herzegovina
- Canton: West Herzegovina
- Municipality: Ljubuški

Area
  - Total: 3.18 sq mi (8.24 km^{2})

Population (2013)
  - Total: 1,155
  - Density: 363/sq mi (140/km^{2})
- Time zone: UTC+1 (CET)
  - Summer (DST): UTC+2 (CEST)

Grab (Serbian: Граб) is a village in Bosnia and Herzegovina. According to the 1991 census, the village is located in the municipality of Ljubuški.

== Demographics ==
According to the 2013 census, its population was 1,155.

Ethnicity in 2013
Ethnicity	Number	Percentage
Croats	1,150	99.6%
Serbs	2	0.2%
other/undeclared	3	0.3%
Total	1,155	100%
