= Vašarovići =

- Village
- Location within Bosnia and Herzegovina
- Coordinates: 43°12′18″N 17°28′20″E
- Country: Bosnia and Herzegovina
- Entity: Federation of Bosnia and Herzegovina
- Canton: West Herzegovina
- Municipality: Ljubuški

Area
  - Total: 2.23 sq mi (5.77 km^{2})

Population (2013)
  - Total: 801
  - Density: 360/sq mi (139/km^{2})
- Time zone: UTC+1 (CET)
  - Summer (DST): UTC+2 (CEST)

Vašarovići is a village in Bosnia and Herzegovina. According to the 1991 census, the village is located in the municipality of Ljubuški.

== Demographics ==
According to the 2013 census, its population was 801.

Ethnicity in 2013
Ethnicity	Number	Percentage
Croats	799	99.8%
other/undeclared	2	0.2%
Total	801	100%
