= Čeveljuša =

Čeveljuša may refer to:

- Čeveljuša, Ploče, a village in Croatia
- Čeveljuša (waterfall), a waterfall in Bosnia and Herzegovina
