= Gradska =

Gradska Градска
- Village
- Location within Bosnia and Herzegovina
- Coordinates: 43°13′N 17°34′E
- Country: Bosnia and Herzegovina
- Entity: Federation of Bosnia and Herzegovina
- Canton: West Herzegovina
- Municipality: Ljubuški

Area
  - Total: 2.79 sq mi (7.23 km^{2})

Population (2013)
  - Total: 145
  - Density: 51.9/sq mi (20.1/km^{2})
- Time zone: UTC+1 (CET)
  - Summer (DST): UTC+2 (CEST)

Gradska (Cyrillic: Градска) is a village in Bosnia and Herzegovina. The village is located in the municipality of Ljubuški.

== Demographics ==
According to the 2013 census, its population was 145.

Ethnicity in 2013
| Ethnicity | Number | Percentage |
|---|---|---|
| Bosniaks | 111 | 76.6% |
| Croats | 33 | 22.8% |
| other/undeclared | 1 | 0.7% |
| Total | 145 | 100% |
