= Stubica, Ljubuški =

Stubica
- Village
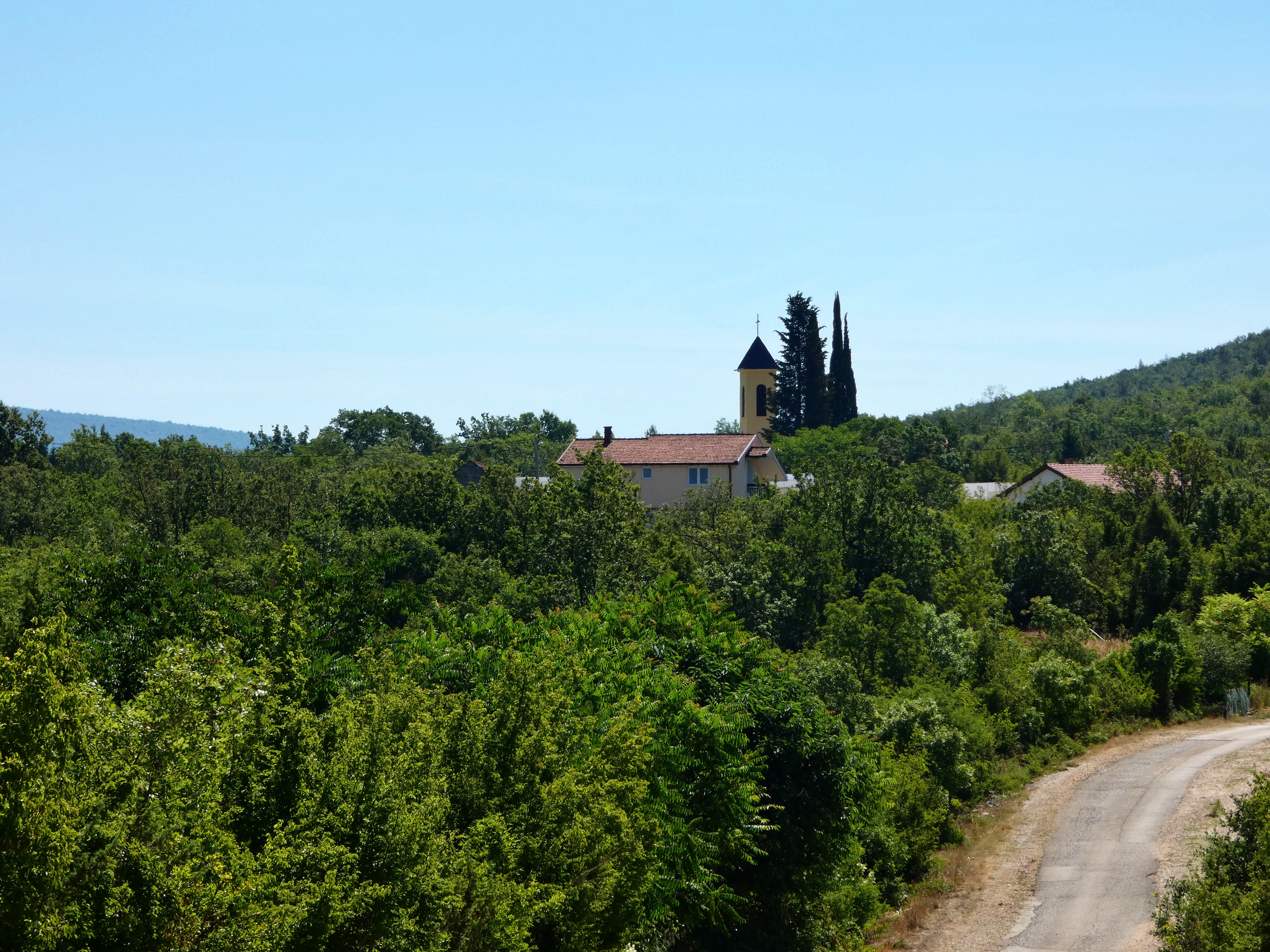

- Location within Bosnia and Herzegovina
- Country: Bosnia and Herzegovina
- Entity: Federation of Bosnia and Herzegovina
- Canton: West Herzegovina
- Municipality: Ljubuški

Area
  - Total: 3.73 sq mi (9.65 km^{2})

Population (2013)
  - Total: 305
  - Density: 81.9/sq mi (31.6/km^{2})
- Time zone: UTC+1 (CET)
  - Summer (DST): UTC+2 (CEST)

Stubica is a village in Bosnia and Herzegovina. According to the 1991 census, the village is located in the municipality of Ljubuški.

== Demographics ==
According to the 2013 census, its population was 305, all Croats.
