= Vitina (disambiguation) =

Vitina is a town and municipality in eastern Kosovo.

Vitina may also refer to:

- Vitina (Ljubuški), a village in the municipality of Ljubuški, West Herzegovina Canton, Bosnia and Herzegovina
- Vitina (Rudozem), a village in the municipality of Rudozem, Smolyan Province, Bulgaria
- Vitina, an alternative spelling of Vytina, Greece
