= Dinko Šakić =

Croatian war criminal (1921–2008)

- Born: Dinko Ljubomir Šakić; 8 September 1921; Studenci, Kingdom of Serbs, Croats and Slovenes (now Bosnia and Herzegovina)
- Died: 20 July 2008 (aged 86); Zagreb, Croatia
- Spouse: Nada Luburić (m. 1943)
- Military career
- Allegiance: Independent State of Croatia
- Branch: Ustaše Supervisory Service (UNS)
- Service years: 1941–1945
- Nickname: Ljubo
- Commands: Jasenovac concentration camp
- Conflicts: World War II in Yugoslavia

Dinko Šakić (Croatian pronunciation: [dîːŋko ʃǎkit͡ɕ]; 8 September 1921 – 20 July 2008) was a Croatian Ustaše official, and convicted war criminal, who commanded the Jasenovac concentration camp in the Independent State of Croatia (NDH) from April to November 1944, during World War II.

Born in the village of Studenci, near the town of Imotski in what was then the Kingdom of Serbs, Croats and Slovenes, he became a member of the fascist Ustaše at a young age. When the Axis powers occupied the Kingdom of Yugoslavia in April 1941, Šakić, aged 19, joined the administration in Jasenovac. He became the camp's assistant commander the following year, and married Nada Luburić, the half-sister of concentration camp commander Vjekoslav "Maks" Luburić, in 1943. This marriage, as well as his fanatic support for Ustaše leader Ante Pavelić, led to Šakić's appointment as commander of Jasenovac in April 1944. He was charged in the deaths of an estimated 2,000 people who died during his six months of command at the concentration camp.

In 1945, Šakić and his wife fled the Independent State of Croatia alongside other Ustaše officials following the collapse of the NDH and Nazi Germany. They emigrated to Argentina in 1947, where Šakić started a textile business, was an active member of the country's 10,000-strong Croat community, and became friends with Paraguayan dictator Alfredo Stroessner.

He lived an otherwise quiet life and made no effort to hide his identity. In 1990, the Feral Tribune interviewed Šakić for a magazine article and published his picture. Šakić met Croatian President Franjo Tuđman at a reception in Buenos Aires during the latter's visit to Argentina in 1994 and was interviewed by a Croatian publication called Magazin soon afterwards. He stated in the interview that he wished more Serbs had been killed in Jasenovac, saying that he would "do it all again", added that he "slept like a baby" and stated "The Independent State of Croatia (NDH) was the foundation on which today's Croatia was built".

In March 1998, Šakić was interviewed by Argentine national television. He admitted to having been in a leadership position at Jasenovac but denied that anyone had been killed there during this time, claiming that all of those who perished had died from disease. The interview was broadcast across the nation the following month. It caused an uproar and caused Argentine president Carlos Menem to call for Šakić's arrest. Šakić disappeared soon after and was not arrested until May 1998. He was extradited to Croatia, where he was tried, found guilty of war crimes and crimes against humanity in October 1998 and sentenced to 20 years in prison. Šakić called the charges politically motivated and described himself as a Croatian patriot who only wanted to defend his country.

Šakić was imprisoned in Lepoglava Prison and kept in a cell equipped with a television set and a computer for him to write his memoirs. He was allowed to visit his wife, who had been placed in a home for the elderly, several times a month. He died of heart problems in a Zagreb hospital on 20 July 2008 and was later cremated in full Ustaše uniform, as per his wishes.

== Early life ==
Voice of America pronunciation of Dinko Šakić

Dinko Ljubomir Šakić was born in the village of Studenci, near the town of Imotski in what was then the Kingdom of Serbs, Croats and Slovenes on 8 September 1921. He finished his education at the high school level. He became a committed member of the Croatian fascist movement known as the Ustaše at a very young age.

== Jasenovac ==
In April 1941, Axis forces invaded and occupied Yugoslavia. The country was dismembered, with the extreme Croatian nationalist and fascist Ante Pavelić, who had been in exile in Benito Mussolini's Italy, being appointed Poglavnik (leader) of an Ustaše-led Croatian state – the Independent State of Croatia (often called the NDH, from the Croatian: Nezavisna Država Hrvatska). The NDH combined almost all of modern-day Croatia, all of modern-day Bosnia and Herzegovina and parts of modern-day Serbia into an "Italian-German quasi-protectorate." NDH authorities, led by the Ustaše militia, subsequently implemented genocidal policies against the Serb, Jewish and Romani population living within the borders of the new state.

Šakić joined the administration of the Jasenovac concentration camp in 1941. The following year he was appointed its assistant commander. Here, he became the protégé of concentration camp commander Vjekoslav "Maks" Luburić. According to eyewitness testimony, Šakić murdered Croatian poet Mihovil Pavlek Miškina in June 1942. That summer, Šakić is alleged to have personally directed an exhaust pipe into a van filled with women and children at the Stara Gradiška concentration camp, killing all those inside.

In 1943, Šakić married Nada, Maks Luburić's half-sister who began working at Jasenovac at age 16. Šakić became the commander of the Jasenovac concentration camp at the age of twenty-two in April 1944, his rapid rise through the ranks of the Ustaše coming partly as a result of his fanatic support for Pavelić's regime and partly due to his marriage to Nada. Jasenovac survivor Šimo Klaić recalled: "Šakić was very young for such an important position. He was arrogant and always impeccably dressed in polished black leather boots and a tailored black Ustaše uniform. We were emaciated, in rags and sick. He would stride past us looking as if he had stepped out of a fashion magazine".

In June 1944, Šakić ordered reprisals be carried out against prisoners following the escape of an inmate named Ivan Wollner, who was captured in Hrvatska Dubica and beaten to death by the Ustaše soon after his escape. Šakić personally selected twenty-five Jewish inmates from a group of 100 prisoners who had lived in the same barracks as Wollner. These were taken to a building called the "Zvonara", where they were put in solitary confinement, starved and tortured.

Šakić took part in the torture of Remzija Rebac, who, along with Milo Bošković, led a group of twenty internees who organized an uprising and stole corn. Rebac was tortured with a flamethrower. Šakić ordered the group executed by hanging during a camp "public performance" on 21 September 1944. Facing death, Bošković asked to be shot in the head instead of being hanged. Šakić agreed and, prior to shooting him, is reported to have said that he valued Bošković "as a man and expert and that he should feel honoured to have the camp's commander personally kill him".

Šakić ordered the hanging of Marin Jurcev, manager of the infirmary in Jasenovac, who aided an Ustaše defector in smuggling information about the camp to the Yugoslav Partisans. Jurcev, his wife, and three internees held in the village of Jasenovac were executed. Jurcev's wife had to be pulled to the scaffold by her hair since she fell off three times. Šakić sat and ate red beets and fried schnitzel while watching the hanged bodies with Croatian Interior Minister Andrija Artuković.

Šakić is reported to have personally taken part in killing and torturing inmates. Eyewitnesses stated that he shot prisoners numerous times, often killing for sport those who were sent to work in the fields surrounding Jasenovac. Ostensibly seeking to prevent the spread of typhoid, malaria and diphtheria, Šakić detained inmates whom he deemed to be unhealthy – ordering that they be killed inside a house that he called "the hospital". On another occasion, Šakić ordered two or three dozen inmates to be locked inside a room until they died from thirst and starvation. In the fall of 1944, an American bomber crashed near the camp after conducting a raid over Hungary. Three airmen parachuted from it and landed by the Sava River. Šakić had the three captured, beaten and paraded through Jasenovac. The men were tortured for three days before Šakić ordered that they be bayoneted to death and their bodies dumped in a mass grave. During Šakić's tenure in charge of Jasenovac, at least 2,000 inmates were killed. Many others died due to malnutrition or disease.

== Exile ==
"He is the most notorious living Nazi war criminal not in custody."

— George Spectre, associate director of the B'nai B'rith center for public policy, in April 1998.

With the end of the war, Šakić fled Croatia, alongside Pavelić and other Ustaše leaders, to Argentina. They were welcomed by Argentine leader Juan Perón. Šakić and his wife first found refuge in Francoist Spain, before settling in Argentina in 1947. Šakić's wife changed her name to Esperanza. The two settled in the coastal town of Santa Teresita in Buenos Aires, where Šakić ran a textile business and was an active member of the country's 10,000-strong Croat community. Šakić and his wife had three children, and arranged for Pavelić to be their godfather. In 1956, the Šakić family fled Argentina following the fall of Perón's government. They went back to Spain before returning to Argentina three years later.

Šakić was a friend of Paraguayan dictator Alfredo Stroessner, for whom he operated a "rest camp" for Croatian fascists in Paraguay. He lived an otherwise quiet life and engaged in Ustaše émigré politics. He did not hide his identity and did not make an effort to change his name. In 1990, the Feral Tribune interviewed Šakić for a magazine article which was published together with his recent photo. In this interview Šakić admonished Serbs and praised Ustaše. Later that year, he attended what the Chicago Tribune termed a "reunion of former Nazis" in Austria.

Šakić met Croatian leader Franjo Tuđman at a reception in Buenos Aires during the latter's visit to Argentina in 1994. Afterwards, Šakić was interviewed by a Croatian publication called Magazin. He stated he wished more Serbs had been killed in Jasenovac, saying that he would "do it all again". He added that he "slept like a baby".

== Arrest and extradition ==
In March 1998, Šakić was interviewed by the Argentine national television. The full interview was broadcast on El Trece on 6 April. In it, Šakić admitted to being in a leadership position at Jasenovac from December 1942 to October 1944 but denied that anyone had been killed during this period. He said: "When I was there no guard or administrator was allowed to so much as touch a prisoner. I'm not speaking about what it was like before or afterward, but when I was there no one could touch anyone." Šakić claimed all the deaths that occurred during his command came as a result of natural causes. The interview caused a public uproar, with Argentine president Carlos Menem calling for Šakić's arrest a day after the broadcast. Šakić disappeared soon afterwards. His wife claimed that he had left to seek refuge in the Croatian Embassy in Buenos Aires, which the embassy denied. She stated that her husband had not committed acts of genocide in Jasenovac, saying: "It's such a huge lie. I am distraught. After fifty years, they come up with an atrocious thing like this". Dinko Šakić was arrested on 1 May. He was then handed over to Croatian authorities on 17 June, and was extradited back to Croatia on 18 June 1998.

== Trial and imprisonment ==
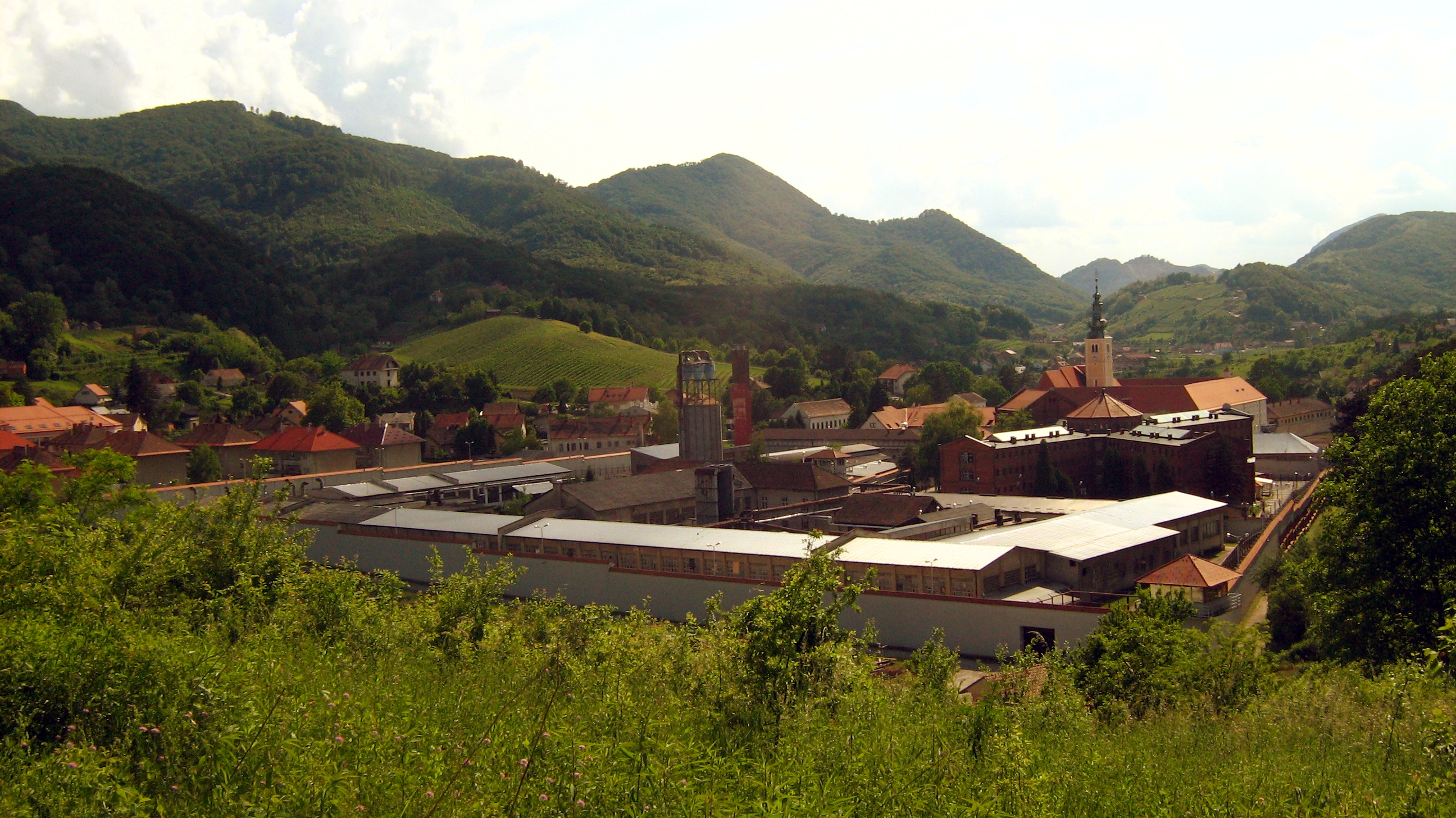
The Lepoglava prison, where Šakić served his sentence.

Šakić was one of the most important figures from World War II who was still alive at the time of his trial. He was the last known living commander of a World War II concentration camp. Šakić defended himself by claiming that Jasenovac was a Serb-Communist myth which was "created to destroy Croats".

He showed no remorse and stated that Jasenovac was not an extermination camp but a work camp designed to hold the enemies of the NDH, whom he claimed were treated in a kind and benevolent manner. He claimed that no killings had occurred during his command. He maintained that the camp was organized to hold those complicit in the "Serbian genocidal policies" that he claimed were implemented against the Croats from 1919 until 1941. Šakić stated that his conscience was clear before God and that he would do what he had done in Jasenovac again if the "biological existence" of Croats were threatened once more. He acknowledged that Jews and Romanis were detained because of their ethnicity but claimed Serbs and others were held as enemies of the state who wanted to destroy Croatia.

I am proud of what I did and would do it again. Jasenovac was a legal institution based on law, where all those proved to have worked for the destruction of the Croatian state, and who had been dangerous for public order and safety, were interned. Considering the duration and population of the camp, the death rate was natural and normal. If we shot people, we did it on the basis of the law. There are no states in the world that don't have prisons and camps, and somebody has to perform this thankless duty. I regret that we hadn't done all that is imputed to us, for, had we done that then, today Croatia would not have had problems. There wouldn't have been people to write these lies.

He claimed the establishment of Yugoslavia and the Yugoslav Wars were evidence of Serbs having planned and carried out a genocide against Croats. Šakić called the proceedings politically motivated and described himself as a Croatian patriot who only wanted to defend his country. He said Croatia had come under international pressure during its World War II history.

The ensuing trial saw more than forty witnesses testify against Šakić. His defence lawyers asked that he be acquitted; they claimed that the prosecution had failed to prove his guilt and stated that Šakić was merely obeying orders while serving at the camp. On 4 October 1998, Šakić was found guilty of war crimes and crimes against humanity and sentenced to twenty years in prison. Šakić applauded mockingly as the guilty verdict was read out to him. The presiding judge confirmed that Šakić had personally shot prisoners and had overseen the hanging of at least twenty inmates. He pointed out that at least four witnesses testified to having seen Šakić empty his pistol into the head of Milo Bošković in September 1944.

Šakić served his sentence in Lepoglava prison. His cell came equipped with a television set and a computer for him to write his memoirs. He was allowed to visit his wife, who had been placed in a home for the elderly, several times a month.

== Death ==
Šakić suffered from heart problems throughout his imprisonment and spent most of his later years in hospital. He died of heart problems in a Zagreb hospital on 20 July 2008 and was cremated in full Ustaše uniform, as per his wishes.

The priest who celebrated the funeral Mass, Vjekoslav Lasić, stated that "the court that convicted Dinko Šakić convicted Croatia and the Croatian nation". He claimed that "the NDH is the foundation of the modern Croatian homeland" and eulogized Šakić by saying that "every honorable Croat should be proud of [his] name".

Šakić's funeral was attended by several Croatian politicians, including Anto Kovačević. Simon Wiesenthal Center director Efraim Zuroff, as well as the Israeli ambassador to Croatia, both lodged complaints with Croatian president Stjepan Mesić about Šakić's funeral.

== In popular culture ==
- Šakić is featured on the Military Channel's show Nazi Collaborators, episode "Beast of the Balkans".
