= Mostarska Vrata =

- Village
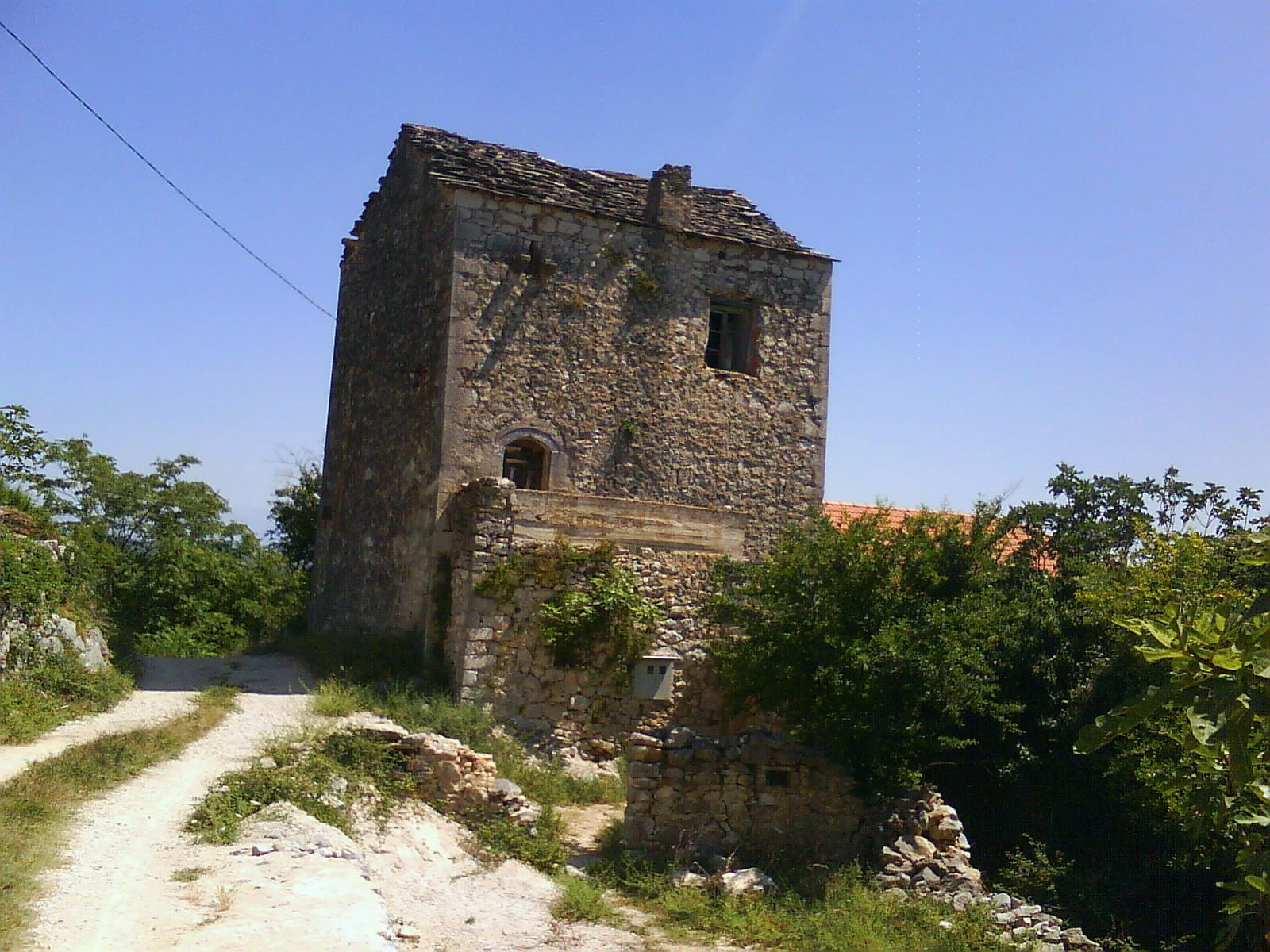

- Location within Bosnia and Herzegovina
- Coordinates: 43°12′N 17°34′E
- Country: Bosnia and Herzegovina
- Entity: Federation of Bosnia and Herzegovina
- Canton: West Herzegovina
- Municipality: Ljubuški

Area
  - Total: 1.55 sq mi (4.02 km^{2})

Population (2013)
  - Total: 491
  - Density: 316/sq mi (122/km^{2})
- Time zone: UTC+1 (CET)
  - Summer (DST): UTC+2 (CEST)

Mostarska Vrata ("The Door of Mostar" in Croatian) is a village in Bosnia and Herzegovina. According to the 1991 census, the village is located in the municipality of Ljubuški.

== Demographics ==
According to the 2013 census, its population was 491.

Ethnicity in 2013
Ethnicity	Number	Percentage
Croats	487	99.2%
other/undeclared	4	0.8%
Total	491	100%
