= Cerno =

- Village
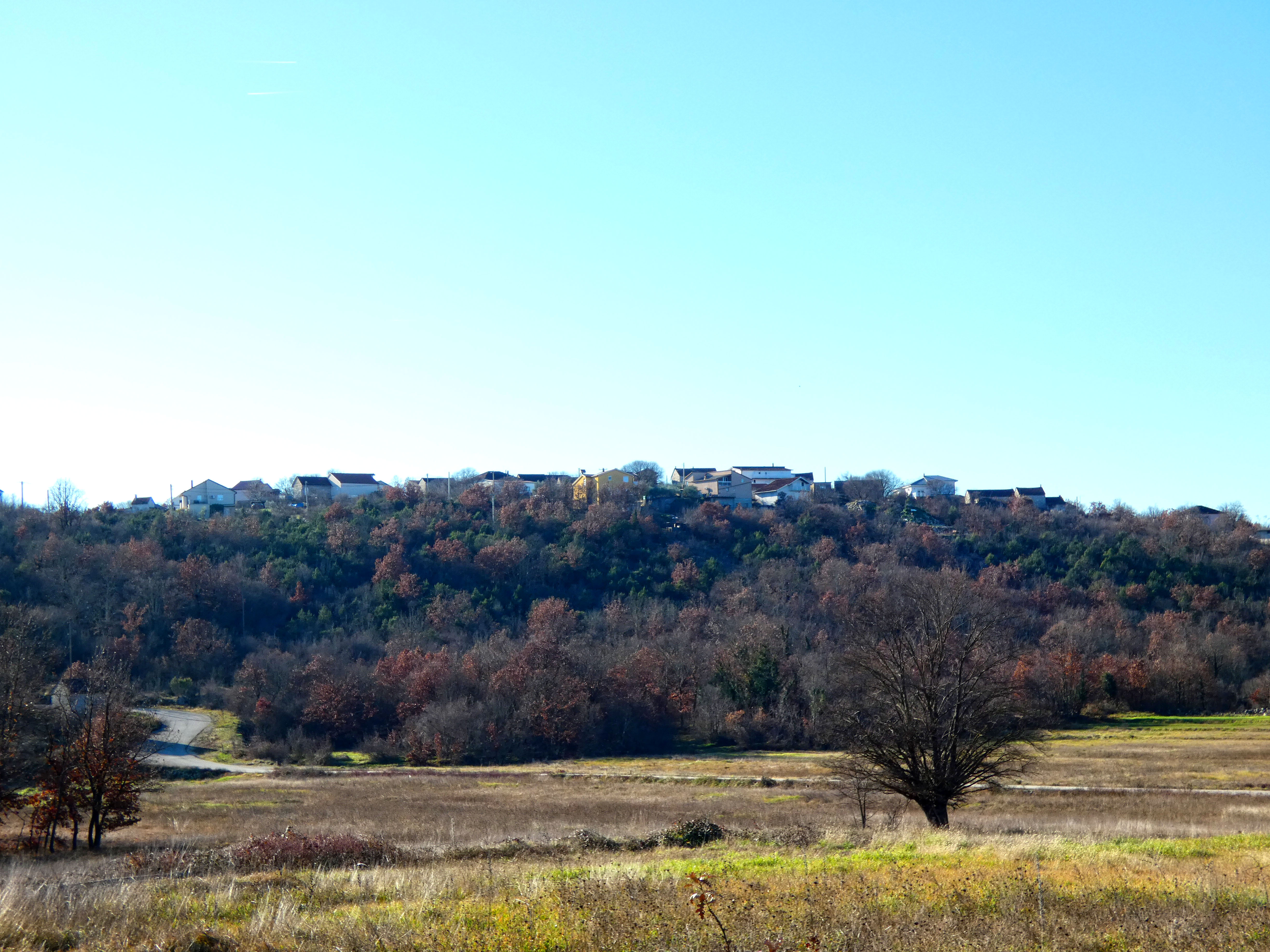

- Location within Bosnia and Herzegovina
- Coordinates: 43°12′50″N 17°37′06″E
- Country: Bosnia and Herzegovina
- Entity: Federation of Bosnia and Herzegovina
- Canton: West Herzegovina
- Municipality: Ljubuški

Area
  - Total: 3.42 sq mi (8.86 km^{2})

Population (2013)
  - Total: 355
  - Density: 104/sq mi (40.1/km^{2})
- Time zone: UTC+1 (CET)
  - Summer (DST): UTC+2 (CEST)

Cerno is a village in the municipality of Ljubuški, Bosnia and Herzegovina.

== Demographics ==
According to the 2013 census, its population was 355, all Croats.
