= Hrašljani =

- Village
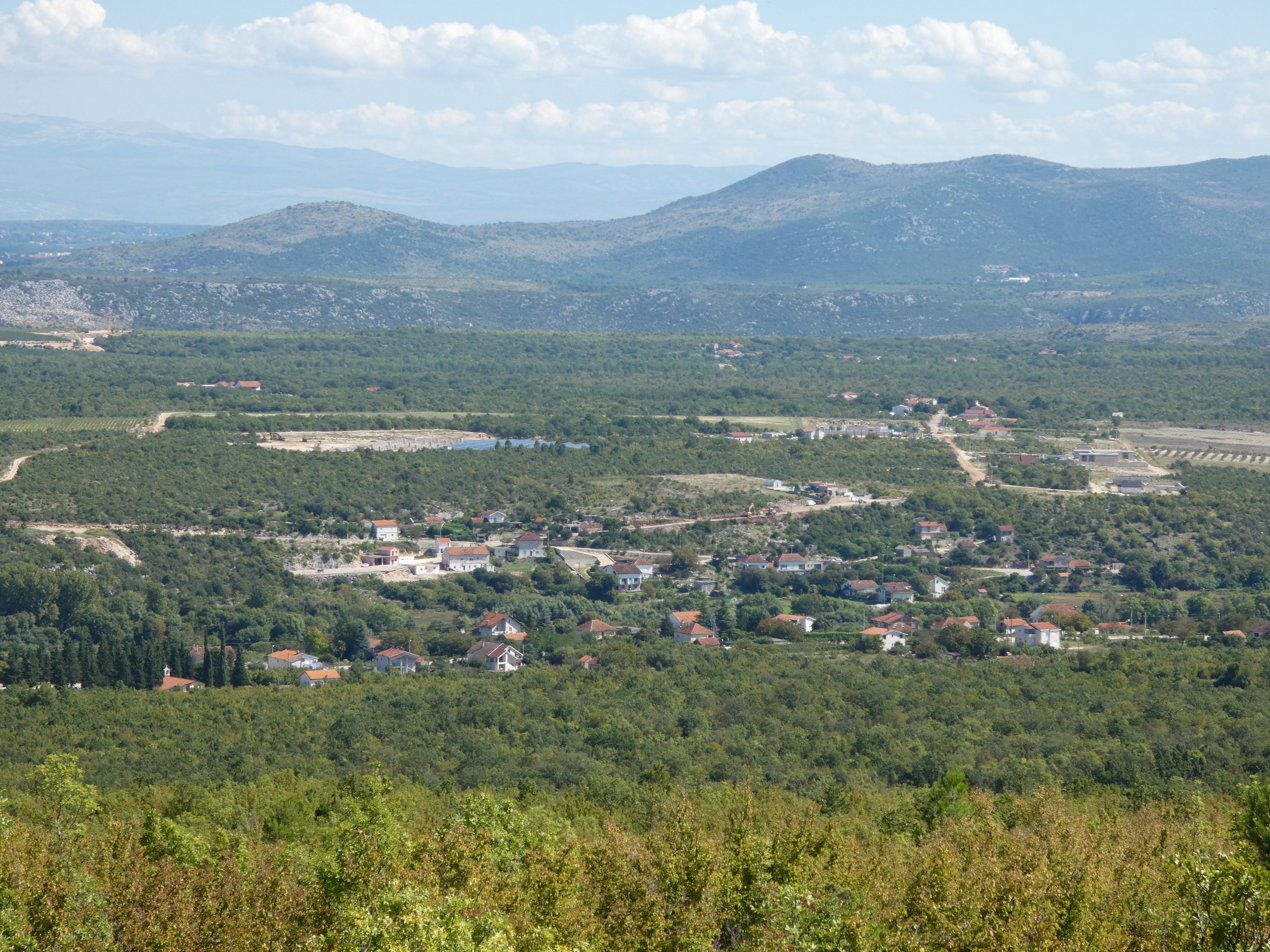

- Location within Bosnia and Herzegovina
- Country: Bosnia and Herzegovina
- Entity: Federation of Bosnia and Herzegovina
- Canton: West Herzegovina
- Municipality: Ljubuški

Area
  - Total: 4.25 sq mi (11.02 km^{2})

Population (2013)
  - Total: 798
  - Density: 188/sq mi (72.4/km^{2})
- Time zone: UTC+1 (CET)
  - Summer (DST): UTC+2 (CEST)

Hrašljani is a village in Bosnia and Herzegovina. According to the 1991 census, the village is located in the municipality of Ljubuški.

== Demographics ==
According to the 2013 census, its population was 798.

Ethnicity in 2013
Ethnicity	Number	Percentage
Croats	794	99.5%
other/undeclared	4	0.5%
Total	798	100%
