= Proboj =

- Village
- Location within Bosnia and Herzegovina
- Coordinates: 43°13′54″N 17°31′15″E
- Country: Bosnia and Herzegovina
- Entity: Federation of Bosnia and Herzegovina
- Canton: West Herzegovina
- Municipality: Ljubuški

Area
  - Total: 2.73 sq mi (7.07 km^{2})

Population (2013)
  - Total: 701
  - Density: 257/sq mi (99.2/km^{2})
- Time zone: UTC+1 (CET)
  - Summer (DST): UTC+2 (CEST)

Proboj is a village in Bosnia and Herzegovina. According to the 1991 census, the village is located in the municipality of Ljubuški.

== Demographics ==
Proboj
Year	1991	1981	1971
Croats	759 (98,69%)	785 (98,61%)	808 (100%)
Serbs	1 (0,13%)	1 (0,12%)	0
Muslims	0	0	0
Yugoslavs	4 (0,52%)	2 (0,25%)	0
Others and unknown	5 (0,65%)	8 (1,00%)	0
Total	769	796	808

According to the 2013 census, its population was 701, all Croats.
