= Lipno, Ljubuški =

Lipno
- Village
- Location within Bosnia and Herzegovina
- Coordinates: 43°16′N 17°33′E
- Country: Bosnia and Herzegovina
- Entity: Federation of Bosnia and Herzegovina
- Canton: West Herzegovina
- Municipality: Ljubuški

Area
  - Total: 5.65 sq mi (14.63 km^{2})

Population (2013)
  - Total: 223
  - Density: 39.5/sq mi (15.2/km^{2})
- Time zone: UTC+1 (CET)
  - Summer (DST): UTC+2 (CEST)

Lipno (Serbian: Липно) is a village in the municipality of Ljubuški, Bosnia and Herzegovina. According to the 1991 census, the village had a population of 536, almost all ethnic Croats. It is one of the small villages in the Herzegovina region and covers an area of about 14.6 square kilometers.

== Demographics ==
According to the 2013 census, its population was 223, all Croats.
