= Studenci, Ljubuški =

Studenci Студенци
- Village
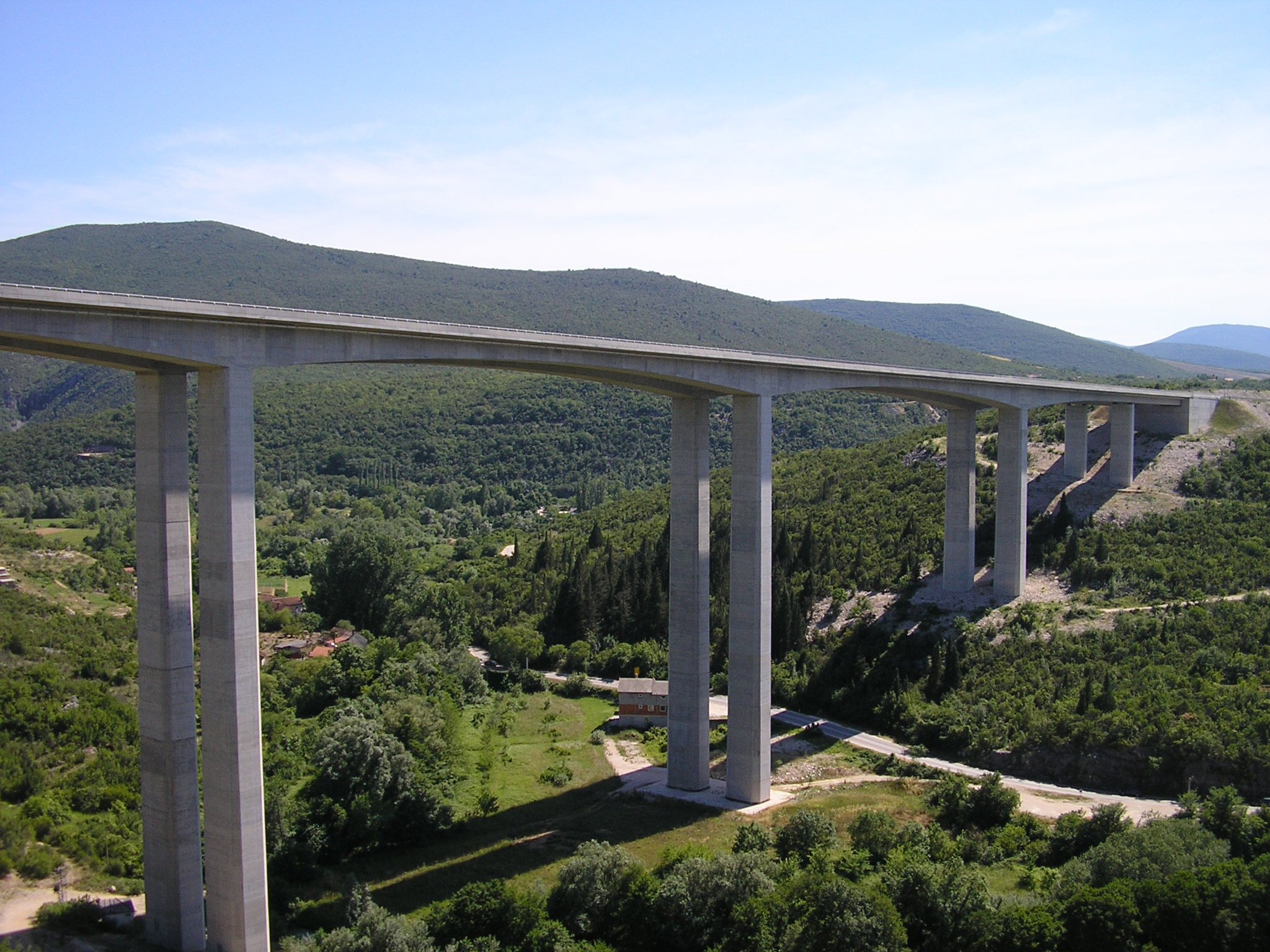

- Location within Bosnia and Herzegovina
- Coordinates: 43°10′03″N 17°37′25″E
- Country: Bosnia and Herzegovina
- Entity: Federation of Bosnia and Herzegovina
- Canton: West Herzegovina
- Municipality: Ljubuški

Area
  - Total: 4.51 sq mi (11.67 km^{2})

Population (2013)
  - Total: 1,143
  - Density: 253.7/sq mi (97.94/km^{2})
- Time zone: UTC+1 (CET)
  - Summer (DST): UTC+2 (CEST)

Studenci (Serbian Cyrillic: Студенци) is a village in the municipality of Ljubuški in West Herzegovina Canton of the Federation of Bosnia and Herzegovina, an entity of Bosnia and Herzegovina. The Kravica cascades are located near this village.

== Demographics ==
According to the 2013 census, its population was 1,143.

Ethnicity in 2013
Ethnicity	Number	Percentage
Croats	1,139	99.7%
other/undeclared	4	0.3%
Total	1,143	100%
