= Vitina, Ljubuški =

Vitina
- Village
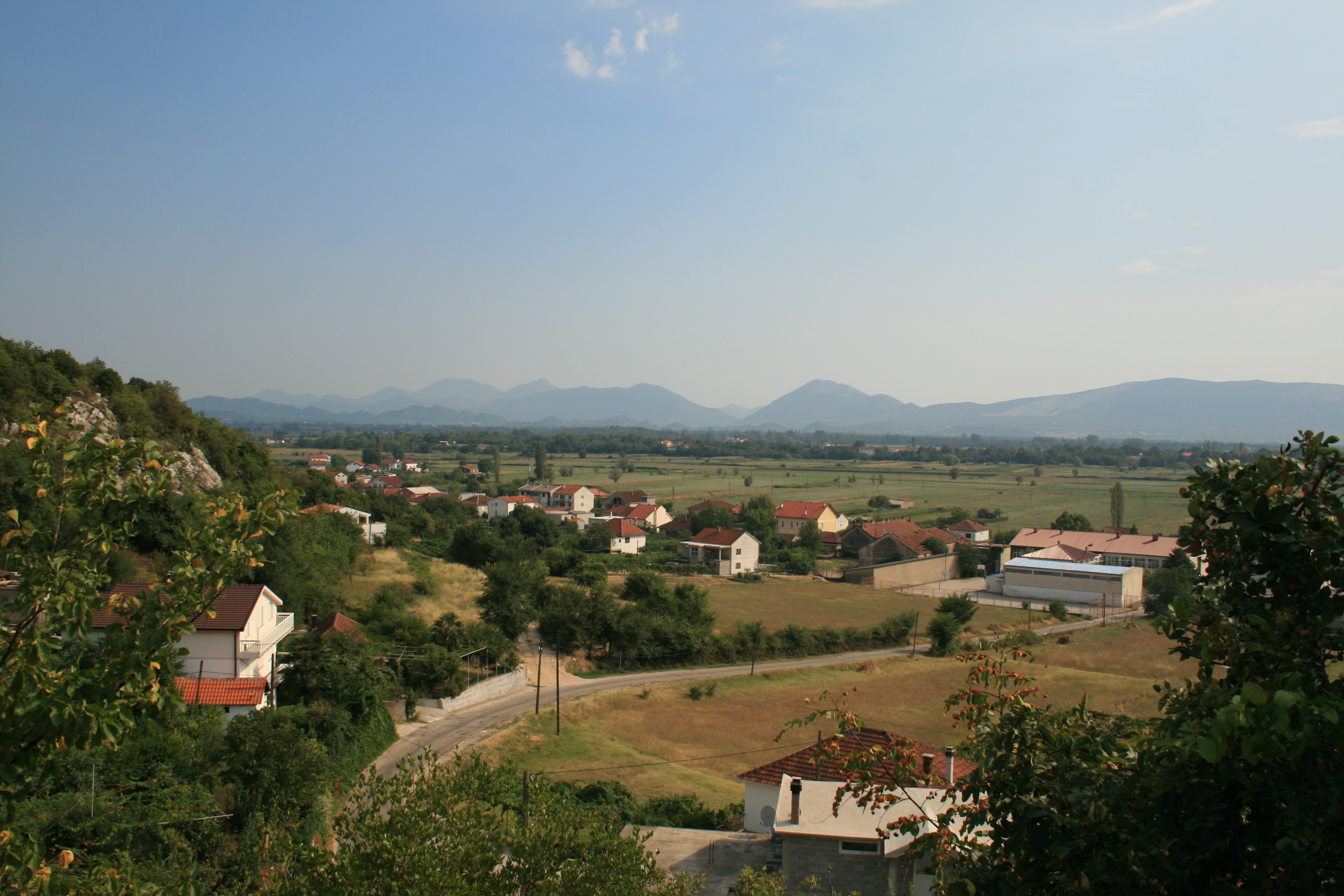
- Panoramic view from mount Zelengora of Vitina

- Location within Bosnia and Herzegovina
- Coordinates: 43.2375°N 17.4839°E
- Country: Bosnia and Herzegovina
- Entity: Federation of Bosnia and Herzegovina
- Canton: West Herzegovina
- Municipality: Ljubuški

Area
  - Total: 7.37 sq mi (19.08 km^{2})

Population (2013)
  - Total: 1,951
  - Density: 264.8/sq mi (102.3/km^{2})
- Time zone: UTC+1 (CET)
  - Summer (DST): UTC+2 (CEST)

Vitina is a village in Bosnia and Herzegovina. According to the 1991 census, the village is located in the municipality of Ljubuški.

== Geography ==
It is located in the Ljubuško polje.

There is no official weather shelter of the Federal Hydrometeorological Institute of Bosnia and Herzegovina, but air temperature data is available by the amateur measurements.

== Demographics ==
According to the 2013 census, its population was 1,951.

Ethnicity in 2013
Ethnicity	Number	Percentage
Croats	1,920	98.4%
Bosniaks	13	0.7%
Serbs	2	0.1%
other/undeclared	16	0.8%
Total	1,951	100%
