= West Herzegovina Canton =

Canton in Bosnia and Herzegovina

West Herzegovina Canton Županija zapadnohercegovačka (Croatian) Zapadnohercegovački kanton (Bosnian) Западнохерцеговачки кантон (Serbian)
- Flag Coat of arms

- Capital and largest city: Široki Brijeg; 43°24′N 17°25′E
- Official languages: Croatian
- Ethnic groups (2013): 98.8% Croats; 1.2% others
- Demonym: West Herzegovinian
- Government: Parliamentary system
  - Prime Minister: Predrag Čović (HDZ BiH)
  - President of Assembly: Ivan Jelčić (HDZ BiH)
- Legislature: Assembly of the West Herzegovina Canton

Canton of the Federation of Bosnia and Herzegovina
  - Establishment: 12 June 1996

Area
  - Total: 1,362 km^{2} (526 sq mi)

Population
  - 2013 census: 94,898
  - Density: 71.87/km^{2} (186.1/sq mi)
- HDI: ▲0.827 very high
- Currency: BAM
- Time zone: UTC+1 (CET)
  - Summer (DST): UTC+2 (CEST)
- Date format: dd-mm-yyyy
- Website vladazzh.com

The West Herzegovina Canton (Croatian: Županija zapadnohercegovačka; Bosnian: Zapadnohercegovački kanton; Serbian: Западнохерцеговачки кантон / Zapadnohercegovački kanton) is a federated state and one of the cantons of the Federation of Bosnia and Herzegovina. The West Herzegovina Canton is in the Herzegovina region in the southwest of Bosnia and Herzegovina. Its seat of government is in Široki Brijeg, while other municipalities within the Canton are Grude, Ljubuški and Posušje. It has 94,898 inhabitants, of whom more than 98% are ethnic Croats, making it the most homogenous canton of the Federation.

== History ==
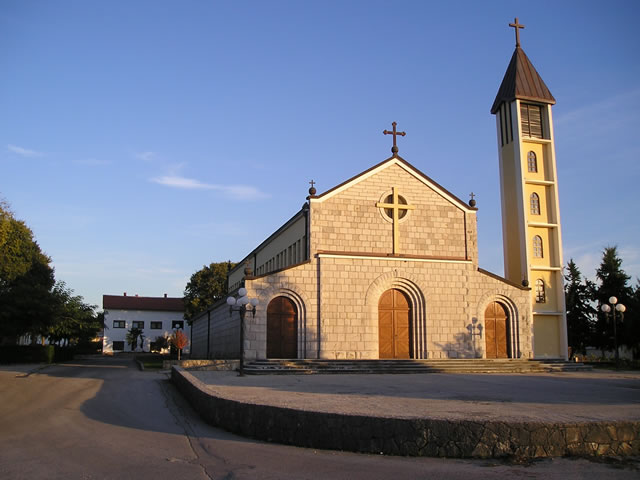
Roman Catholic church of St. Elijah in Tihaljina, Grude.

The majority of the present-day West Herzegovina Canton was part of Zachlumia, the medieval South Slavic principality. In the 15th century, it became part of the Duchy of Saint Sava under Stjepan Vukčić Kosača, who proclaimed himself the herzog (duke), thereby giving the region its name - Herzegovina. The Ottomans conquered Herzegovina in 1483 when the territory of the West Herzegovina Canton became part of the Sanjak of Herzegovina. In 1833 the Sanjak of Herzegovina became more autonomous under Ali-paša Rizvanbegović, who became pasha of the Herzegovina Eyalet, however, after his death, Herzegovina once again became a sanjak. In 1878 the whole territory was occupied and later in 1908 annexed by the Austria-Hungary, who held it until 1918. During that time, the territory of the West Herzegovina Canton was part of the District of Mostar in the Condominium of Bosnia and Herzegovina.

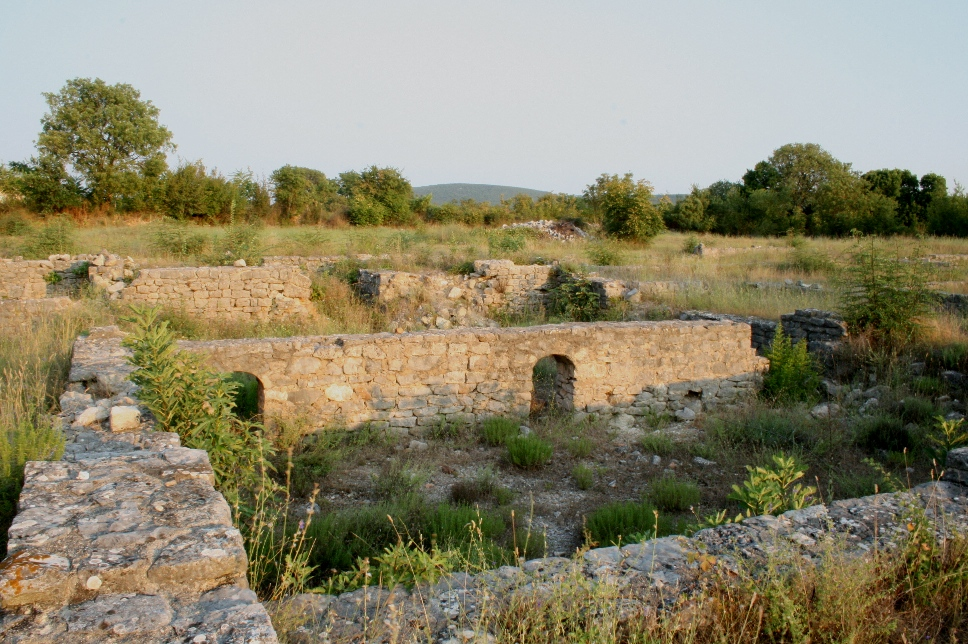
Ruins of an ancient fort dating back to the Roman Period, in Humac

After the collapse of Austria-Hungary and after the creation of the Kingdom of Serbs, Croats and Slovenes, the territory of the West Herzegovina Canton remained part of the District of Mostar. However, with the creation of banovinas in 1929, the territory became part of the Littoral Banovina, and in 1939 it was incorporated in the Banovina of Croatia, where it de iure remained until 1943.

During World War II, the territory of the West Herzegovina Canton became part of the Independent State of Croatia, a Nazi-affiliated puppet state created in April 1941. Administratively, it was part of the County of Hum, having Mostar as its capital. The puppet state collapsed in May 1945. The Yugoslav Partisans formed the People's Republic of Bosnia and Herzegovina (later renamed to Socialist Republic), as a federal unit of Yugoslavia, of which the territory of the West Herzegovina Canton became part as well. However, in the process of the collapse of the communist regime, ethnic Croats formed the Croatian Community of Herzeg-Bosnia, which encompassed all Croat-majority municipalities in Bosnia and Herzegovina, including those of the West Herzegovina Canton.

During the Bosnian War, the Croatian Community of Herzeg-Bosnia was later proclaimed a short-lived republic in 1993. The following year, in 1994, it became part of the Croat-Bosniak Federation of Bosnia and Herzegovina, which led to the formation of ten cantons in June 1996, including the West Herzegovina Canton.

== Geography ==
West Herzegovina Canton is located in the Herzegovina region of southwest Bosnia and Herzegovina. It has the Čvrsnica mountain and Canton 10 to the north, Croatia to the west and south, and the Herzegovina-Neretva Canton to the east. The area of the canton is 1,363 km^{2} (526 sq mi).

The canton has three rivers: Lištica, Trebižat and Ričina, and the Blidinje Lake. Its highest peak is the Pločno on the Čvrsnica mountain, with a height of 2,228 metres.

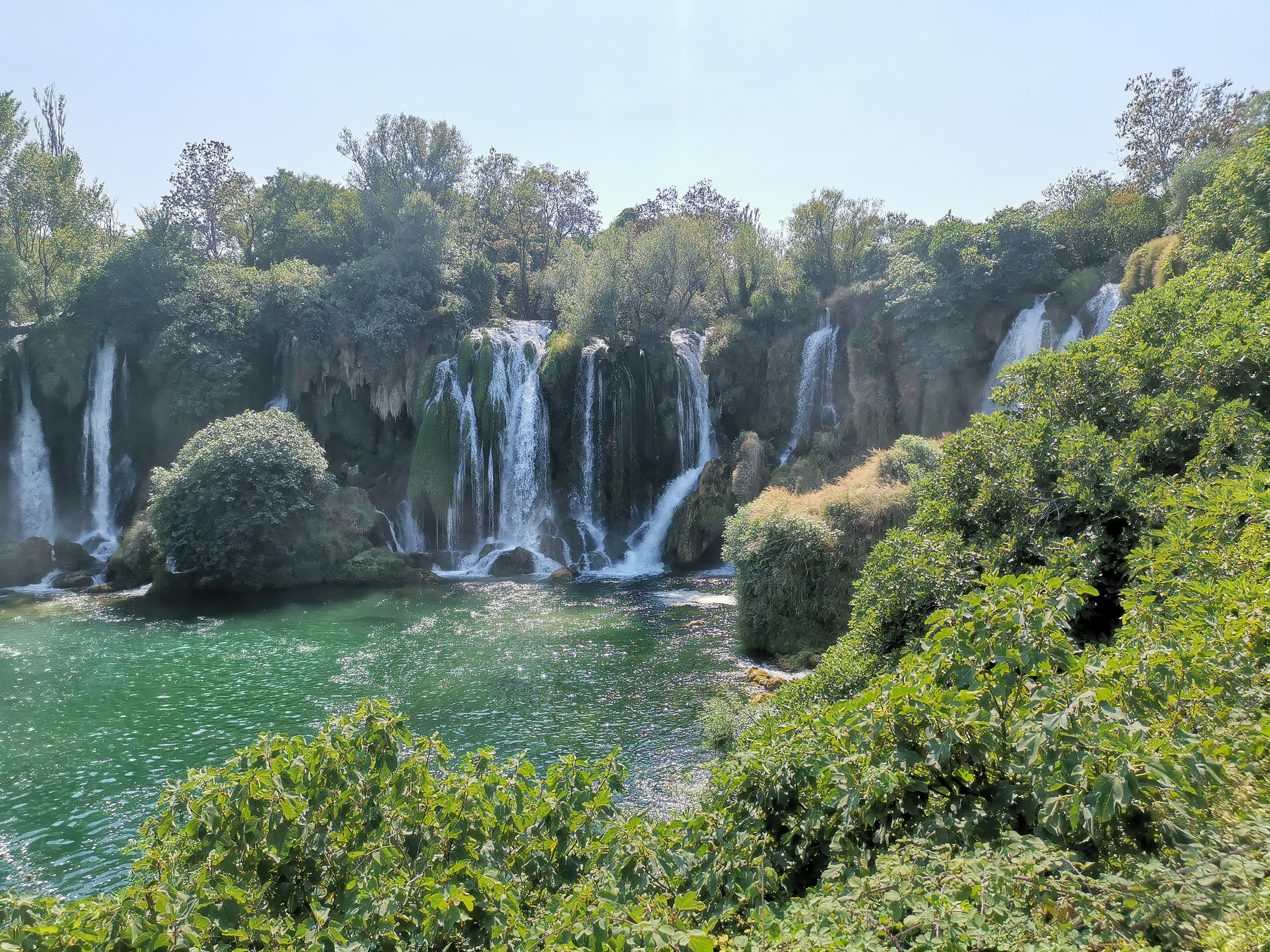
Kravica waterfalls

The canton is a very mountainous area especially in Posušje (where it also becomes mountainous) and the northern parts of Široki Brijeg. The region is interlaced with karst fields with which the mountains of western and northern Herzegovina descend to the sea. Dugo polje (1150–1250 m) is the first step, followed by Rakitno polje (870–910 m), Posuško polje (580–610 m), Bekijsko polje (260–300 m), Mostarsko Blato (220 m) and Ljubuško polje (80–100 m) with which the descent ends. The rivers Lištica and Tihaljina flow through western Herzegovina, Ričina sometimes flows through the Posusje field and Ugrovača through the Kočerin field.

The territory as a whole belongs to the Neretva basin or the Adriatic Sea. The highest mountains are Čvrsnica (municipality of Posušje), Čabulja (municipality of Široki Brijeg), Štitar (municipality of Posušje), Zavelim (municipality of Posušje), Kušanovac (municipality of Posušje) and (municipality of Široki Brijeg) and Radovanj ( Municipality of Posušje).

=== Climate ===
In all towns in the canton of western Herzegovina, the sub-Mediterranean climate type prevails, except in Ljubuški, where the Mediterranean climate predominates. There is also a significant difference between the sub-Mediterranean climate in Posušje and the sub-Mediterranean climate in Široki Brijeg and Grude. In Posušje, mountain and Mediterranean influences collide, so the sub-Mediterranean climate in Posušje is harsher and closer to the temperate mountain climate prevailing in the area of Tribistovo, Radovnje, etc. Summers in western Herzegovina are hot and temperatures exceed 35 degrees. In winter, snow is more frequent and common in the northernmost towns, especially in Posušje.

== Politics and government ==
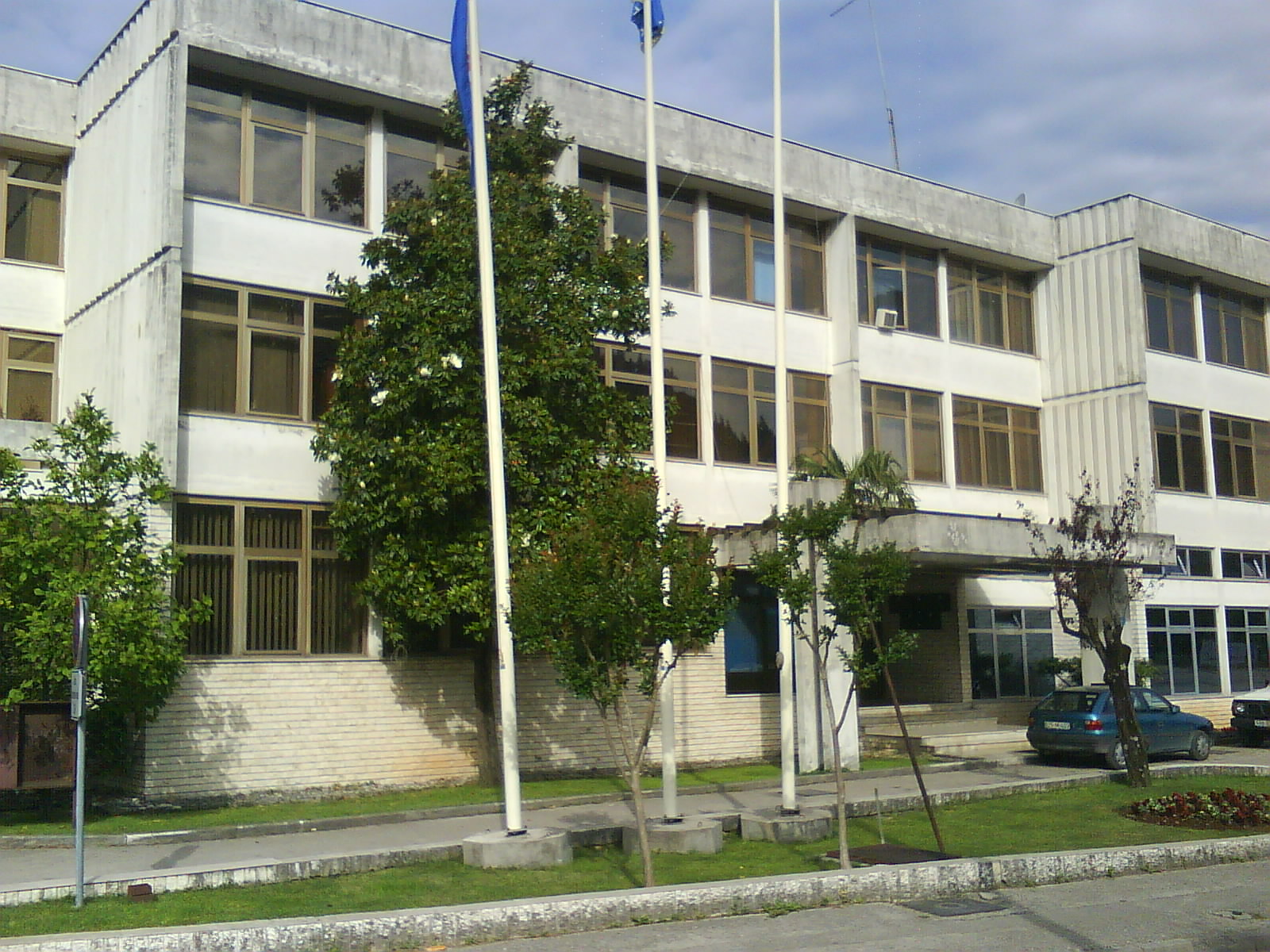
Government seat in Široki Brijeg

=== Legislative branch ===
The Assembly of the West Herzegovina Canton (Croatian: Skupština Županije Zapadnohercegovačke) is the legislature of the West Herzegovina Canton, serving as the unicameral representative body of the citizens of the West Herzegovina Canton. It has 23 representatives elected directly at the Bosnian general election. The representatives have a four-year term. The Assembly enacts the local Constitution, laws and other regulations and elects the Government.

The current composition of the Assembly of the West Herzegovina Canton is:

Groups	Members per group
HDZ BiH–HDU–HSS–HKDU	14 / 23
HDZ 1990	4 / 23
HRS	2 / 23
HSP BiH	1 / 23
HSP AS BiH	1 / 23
HSP HB i BiH	1 / 23

=== Government ===
The Government of the West Herzegovina Canton (Croatian: Vlada Županije Zapadnohercegovačke) is led by the Prime Minister who has one deputy and it consists of seven ministries. The ministries have different seats, with each municipality having two ministries, while the capital Široki Brijeg serves as the seat of the Prime Minister.

Position	Portfolio	Seat	Officeholder	Party
Prime Minister		Široki Brijeg	Predrag Čović	HDZ BiH
Deputy Prime Minister	Finance	Ljubuški	Blagica Leko	HDZ BiH
Deputy Prime Minister	Economy	Posušje	Zvonimir Širić	HDZ BiH
Minister	Internal Affairs	Ljubuški	Mladen Bebek	HDZ BiH
Minister	Judiciary and Administration	Široki Brijeg	Vjekoslav Lasić	HDZ BiH
Minister	Urban Development, Construction and Environment	Posušje	Mate Lončar	HDZ BiH
Minister	Education, Science, Culture and Sports	Široki Brijeg	Daniela Perić	HDZ BiH
Minister	Healthcare, Labour and Social Welfare	Grude	Tomislav Pejić	HDZ BiH
Minister	Veterans	Grude	Mladen Begić	HDZ BiH

=== Flag and coat of arms ===
Flag and emblem of the Croatian Republic of Herzeg-Bosnia used as flag in Canton 10 and West Herzegovina Canton

The coat of arms is a variant of the historical Croatian coat of arms. The flag is a horizontal tricolour of red, white and blue, with the coat of arms in the middle. These symbols were also used by Canton 10 and the former Croatian Republic of Herzeg-Bosnia.

The cantonal constitution originally regulated the flag and coat of arms. However, by a decision of the Constitutional Court, the constitutional provisions on cantonal symbols were marked as unconstitutional in 1998. Acting on the court's decision, the Cantonal Assembly removed the disputed provisions in 2000 and adopted a new law on the flag and coat of arms in 2003 that restored the same symbols.

== Economy ==
According to the data of the Federal Institute for Development Programming, the West Herzegovina Canton had the nominal GDP of 487.211 million BAM, the seventh largest in the Federation of Bosnia and Herzegovina, before the Canton 10, the Bosnian Podrinje Canton Goražde and the Posavina Canton. It generated 2.90% of the total GDP of the Federation of Bosnia and Herzegovina. The West Herzegovina Canton has fifth largest GDP per capita, amounting to 5,973 BAM, while the average in the Federation of Bosnia and Herzegovina is 7,188 BAM.

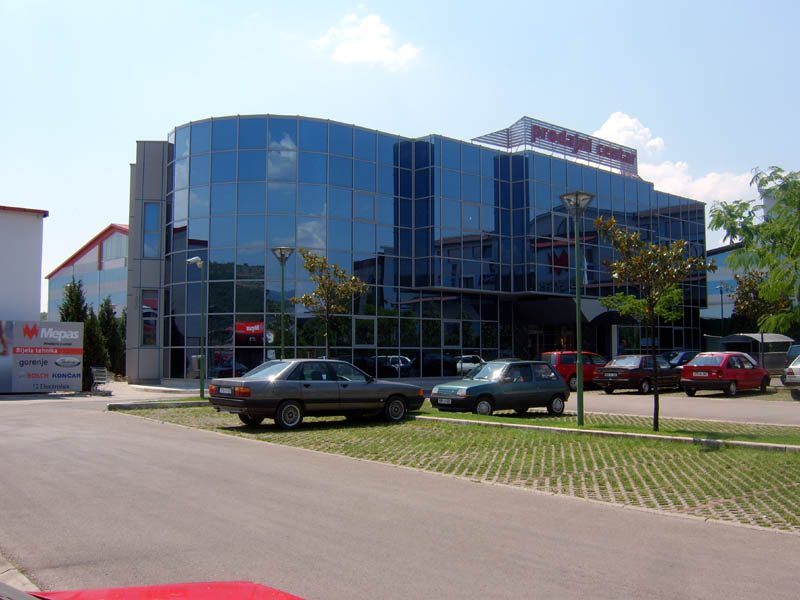
The Mepas Mall in Široki Brijeg

This region, before the war, was one of the poorest regions in BiH. Today it is one of the richest. Despite the canton's small geographical area size, its agricultural sector is important. In the canton, 30,000 ha (120 sq miles) is used for agriculture; 84,000 ha (320 sq miles) is forest. Around 6,000 ha of arable land is below 100 metres in altitude.

=== Infrastructure ===
The West Herzegovina Canton has a central location in Herzegovina, and as such has favorable traffic characteristics. The future route of the motorway of the E73 corridor, where there is also a connection with the A1 motorway from Dubrovnik to Zagreb, which means the entire West Herzegovina Canton in encircled by two EU corridors, the E73 and the E65. The crossroad of these corridors is in the hinterland of Ploče port, making the Canton of West Herzegovina the "portal of the South East Europe".

== Demographics ==
Ethnic groups of West Herzegovina (2013 census)
1. Croats (98.8%)
2. Other groups (1.24%)

According to the latest census data, the vast majority of the local population are Croats. The most dominant religion in the canton is Christianity, with Catholicism being the most numerous denomination. The most significant non-Christian minority are Muslims, with 1.8% of the total population. Most of them were in Ljubuški.

=== 2013 Census ===
Municipality	Nationality				Total
Municipality	Croats	%	Others	%	Total
Ljubuški	27,327	96.96	1,268	3.04	28,184
Široki Brijeg	28,814	99.60	115	0.40	28,929
Posušje	20,424	99.74	19	0.26	20,477
Grude	17,206	99.41	24	0.59	17,308
Canton	93,725	98.76	1,137	1.24	94,898

== Official holidays ==
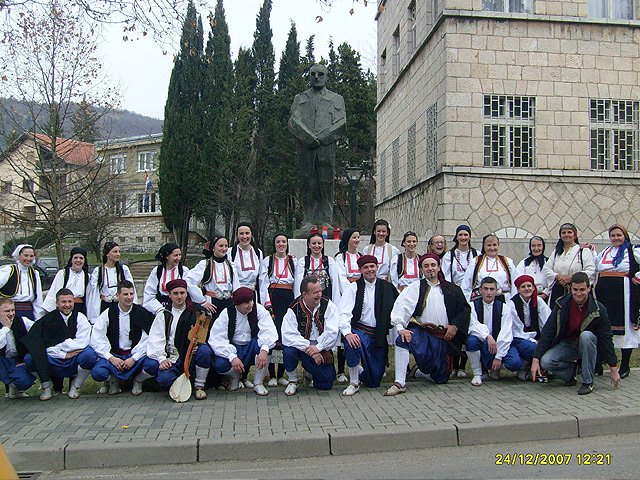
Croatian Cultural and Artistic Society "Brda"

According to local laws, the official holidays (non-working days) in the canton are:

- 1 January – New Year
- 6 January – Epiphany
- 1 May – Labour Day
- 30 May – Statehood Day of Croatia
- 15 August – Assumption of Mary
- 1 November – All Saints' Day
- 2 November – All Souls' Day
- 18 November – Foundation Day of Herzeg-Bosnia
- 25 and 26 December – Christmas Day and Saint Stephen's Day

== See also ==
- Political divisions of Bosnia and Herzegovina
- List of heads of the West Herzegovina Canton
