= Radič Sanković =

14th century Bosnian nobleman

- knez, duke
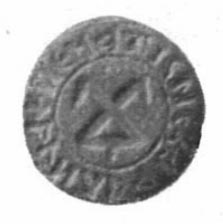
- Seal of Radič Sanković, 1391
- Predecessor: Sanko
- Successor: extinct
- Born: Zaborani hamlet of Glavatičevo (now part of Nevesinje municipality)
- Died: 1404; Blagaj
- Noble family: Sanković
- Spouse: Goisava Balšić
- Father: Sanko Miltenović
- Occupation: military commander

Radič Sanković (Serbian Cyrillic: Радич Санковић; died 1404) was a powerful Bosnian nobleman and magnate, with a title of vojvoda (duke) in the Kingdom of Bosnia during the reign of Stephen Dabiša (1391-1395) and Queen Helen (1395-1398). He allied himself with usurper Stephen Ostoja (1398-1404) during the civil wars, until his death in 1404. With the title of vojvoda (transl. duke; general), he held territories in present-day Herzegovina, including Župa Valley with Glavatičevo as its center, Nevesinje, parts of Popovo Polje and most of Konavle.

== Life ==
Radič was the son of Sanko Miltenović, the eponymous founder of the House of Sanković (the progenitor was Dražen Bogopenec, a lord of Hum under King Stephen Uroš II Milutin of Serbia, fl. 1306). Sanko died in a battle while leading the Bosnian army to aid Ragusa against Serbian lord, Nikola Altomanović, who campaigned against Ragusa in 1370, Radič and his brother Beljak inherited the lands of Nevesinje and Popovo Polje (in Herzegovina) and part of Konavli (southernmost Dalmatia) upon the death of his father. He had brothers Beljak, Budelja, Sančin and sister Dragana. In 1388, he and fellow nobleman Vlatko Vuković led the Bosnian army against the Ottomans at Bileća.

In 1392, Radič and Beljak tried to sell Konavli to the Republic of Ragusa. The same year on May 15, he issued a charter to Dubrovnik merchants enabling them to trade on his territories. However, a stanak was convoked by the king and nobility who objected the sale. Grand duke Vlatko Vuković (of Kosače) and knez Pavle Radinović (of Pavlovići) were sent against Radič in December 1391 after receiving the stanak's blessings. The two captured Radič and occupied Konavli, dividing it between themselves, despite protests from Ragusa. Vuković died shortly after this, and was succeeded by his nephew Sandalj Hranić, who continued to struggle against Radič. Radič regained freedom in 1398, immediately seeking to restore his lost lands, becoming an important ally of Stephen Ostoja. In 1399, he sold the Lisac field to Ragusa for 500 perpers. He also became a member of the Ragusan Great council. Radič participated in the Bosnian-Dubrovnik War in 1403-1404, leading the attacks on Dubrovnik in the name of Ban Stjepan Ostoja. Hranić captured and blinded Radič, and held him in prison until his death in 1404. The area of Nevesinje to the coast was taken by Hranić.
