= Herzegovina =

Historical region of Bosnia and Herzegovina

Herzegovina Hercegovina (Serbo-Croatian) Херцеговина (Serbo-Croatian)
- Historical region in Bosnia and Herzegovina
- Approximate region of Herzegovina
- Coordinates: 43°28′37″N 17°48′54″E
- Regions: East Herzegovina, Herzegovina-Neretva, West Herzegovina, Canton 10
- Established: 15th century
- Largest city: Mostar

Area
  - Total: 12,188 km^{2} (4,706 sq mi)

Population
  - Total: 437,095
  - Density: 35.863/km^{2} (92.884/sq mi)
- Demonym: Herzegovinian
- Time zone: UTC+1 (CET)
  - Summer (DST): UTC+2 (CEST)

Herzegovina (/ˌhɛərtsɪˈɡoʊvɪnə/ HAIRT-sih-GOH-vih-nə or /ˌhɜːrtsəɡoʊˈviːnə/ HURT-sə-goh-VEE-nə; Serbo-Croatian: Hercegovina / Херцеговина, pronounced [ˈxɛ̌rt͡se̞ɡoʋina]) is the southern and smaller of two main geographical regions of Bosnia and Herzegovina, the other being Bosnia. It does not have strictly defined administrative borders today; however, in the past it was organized as the Sanjak of Herzegovina (1470–1833; 1851–1912) and Herzegovina Eyalet (1830–1851).

Bosnia, the larger of the two regions, lies to the north of Herzegovina; the Croatian region of Dalmatia lies to the southwest; the Montenegrin region of Old Herzegovina lies to the southeast. The area of Herzegovina is around 12,188 km^{2} (4,706 sq mi), or around 24% of the country. The largest city is Mostar, in the center of the region. Other large settlements include Trebinje, Široki Brijeg, Ljubuški, Čapljina, Konjic and Posušje.

== Etymology ==
The Ottomans were the first to officially use the name Hercegovina (English: Herzegovina; Turkish: Hersek, Ottoman Turkish: هرسك) for the region in their administrative affairs in a letter from 1 February 1454, written by the Ottoman commander Esebeg from Skopje, and established a sanjak bearing that name in 1470, the Sanjak of Herzegovina, with its first seat at Foča. They simply followed their established custom of naming places and territories they conquered by the name of its prior rulers. In this case Ottomans used Stjepan Vukčić Kosača's title, herceg, a title he gave himself in 1448, and a year later changed it to Herceg of St. Sava, after the Serb saint buried on his territory, considered a miracle worker by Christians of all faiths. It practically became part of his name, in the last few years of his life when he was commonly referred to as Herceg-Stjepan, to name a region he ruled at the time of Ottoman conquest of Bosnia in the second half of the 15th century. Hercegovina is, thus, a possessive noun derived from Herceg-Stjepan's title-name compound and literally means 'duke's land' (hercegovina), 'herceg's land', herceg's holdings and/or territory owned/ruled by a herceg.

The title herceg is a Slavic form of German herzog (the German term for a duke; Serbo-Croatian: vojvoda), and the first among the Kosača dukes to use the title was Herceg-Stjepan, who became the Herceg of Hum in 1449–50. In December 1481, the lands of Stjepan Vukčić's successors were finally occupied by Ottoman forces. Prior to the widespread adoption of the name "Herzegovina", the region was thus referred to as Humska zemlja ("Hum Land"), or Hum for short in Serbo-Croatian.

However, this is just a superficial understanding, and cannot be attributed to Herceg-Stjepan alone, as his title was not of decisive importance after all. Far more crucial was a well-known Ottoman custom to call newly acquired lands by the names of its earlier lords. It was enough for the Ottomans to conquer Stjepan's land as a whole, to start calling it Herzegovina. Also, Herceg Stjepan did not establish this province as a feudal and political unit of the Bosnian state, that honor befell Grand Duke of Bosnia, Vlatko Vuković, who received it from King Tvrtko I, while Sandalj Hranić expanded it and reaffirmed the Kosača family supremacy.

== History ==
=== Medieval period ===
Slavs settled in the Balkans in the 7th century. What later became known as Herzegovina was divided between Croatia, Zachlumia and Travunia in the Early Middle Ages. Parts of the region were ruled by various medieval rulers, who were in vassal relations to Medieval Serbia on the east, and the Kingdom of Croatia on the west. In the 1100s Hum was in the hands of the Nemanjić family, Hungary also claimed Hum as part of its claim on Bosnia, and wars were fought for control by Hungary and the Nemanjić family. By the early 13th century Raška held control of most of Hum, and Sava created a Serbian bishopric at Ston in 1220. In the 1220s Petar is referred to as the Prince of Hum, and he was also elected Prince of Split. The Catholic Church excommunicated him because of his Orthodoxy, but the citizens of Split kept him as prince. Following his death his descendants continued to rule at least part of Hum for a number of decades.

In the course of the war between Stephen Uroš II Milutin and Stephen Dragutin, Paul I Šubić of Bribir from Croatia expanded not only into western Hum, but also beyond the Neretva river, and took the region of Nevesinje and Ston. Paul appointed his eldest son, Mladen II, as Lord of Hum. At least part of Paul's conquests were granted to his vassal Constantine Nelipčić. After Paul's death, Milutin and Dragutin concluded a peace, and went to war against the Šubić family. In the war that followed Milutin took one of Mladen's brother captive, and to get him back Mladen Šubić had to agree to restore a part of Hum to Milutin. After this agreement in 1313 the Neretva again became the border between eastern and western Hum.

After the death of Milutin in 1321, various Serb nobles took sides and in Hum the Branivojević family became the strongest. With their court at Ston they claimed lands from the Cetina River to Kotor, including Pelješac. The Bosnian Ban, Stjepan Kotoromanić, with allied Hum nobles and Serbia refusing to support the Branivojević, took over and annexed Hum in 1326. As part of the war for Hum, Dubrovnik sought to take over Pelješac and Ston, part of Hum held by the Branivojević. Serbia refused to yield it, which led to conflict between Dubrovnik and Serbia. In 1333 the new king of Serbia, Stefan Dušan, sold Pelješac and Ston to Dubrovnik for cash and an annual tribute.

Under Bosnia Kotoromanović's allies, the Draživojević/Sankovic family of Nevesinje, became the leading family in Hum, while Serbian vassals retained eastern Herzegovina. Other than a rebellion by Toljen of Hum's son, Peter, whom Stjepan captured and put to death, the Hum nobles remained largely loyal to Kotoromanić, while also continuing to manage their local regions. Stjepan did take direct control of the valuable custom's house at Drijeva (Metković). The population of Hum remained overwhelmingly Orthodox, compared to elsewhere in Bosnia where the Bosnian Church predominated, and after the arrival of the Franciscans in the 1340s, Catholicism also began to spread.

During the 13th and early 14th centuries the Bosnian bans Stjepan I Kotromanić and Stjepan II Kotromanić joined these regions to the Bosnian state, with the King Tvrtko I Kotromanić extending territories even further, beyond what is modern-day Herzegovina proper.

==== Humska zemlja under Kosača's ====
The town of Novi, founded by the King Tvrtko I, today Herceg Novi, was the winter residence of Kosača

During this period, parts of Herzegovina, or as it was called at the time Humska zemlja, or simply Hum, were given by the King Tvrtko I to, at that point in time the relatively insignificant Bosnian clan of Kosača family and its Vuković branch, headed by Vlatko Vuković, who received it as an award for his service as a supreme commander of the Bosnian army.

Another powerful Bosnian noble family, Pavlović, at the time headed by Pavle Radinović, whose seat was near Rogatica in Drina county, including holdings in Drina and parts of Vrhbosna, also shared some of the territories in Hum centered around Trebinje.

However, at the time when Kosače received the Hum from the King, another powerful Bosnian noble family had a primacy in the region. That family was the Sanković's, credited for capturing Hum for Bosnia and the Ban Stjepan II, who in 1326, dispatched their early branch, the Draživojević's (the next generation of Bogopenec), whose head was Milten Draživojević, along with other noblemen, into Hum to oust the Branivojević family, who were, at the time, loyal to Serbia.

So, Sanković's were very active in the 14th and start of the 15th century in Hum. Their seat was in Glavatičevo's hamlet Biskupi, where today the family burial place with a stećci is still present and protected as a National monument of Bosnia and Herzegovina. The most prominent members were Sanko Miltenović, the eponymous founder of the Sanković's (the progenitor was Dražen Bogopenec), who died in a battle while leading the Bosnian army to aid Ragusa against Serbian lord, the Altomanović, who campaigned against Ragusa in 1370, and his oldest son, Radić Sanković.

The Ottoman threat was brewing to the east, threatening Bosnia and its southeastern regions in Hum. On 27 August 1388, Radić participated in the Battle of Bileća, when the Bosnian army led by the Grand Duke Vlatko, defeated an Ottoman raiding party of up to 18,000 strong. Bosnian heavy cavalry is typically credited with winning the battle as they broke the Ottoman ranks and pursued the retreating enemy. Celebrated Ottoman commander Lala Sahin Pasha (Turkish: Lala Şahin Paşa, 1330 – cca 1382) barely managed to save himself with the small band of his soldiers.

In 1391–1392, Radič and his brother Beljak tried to sell their possessions in Konavle to the Republic of Ragusa. However, a stanak was convoked by the king and the noblemen who opposed the sale of Konavli by Radič Sanković to Dubrovnik. The Grand Duke Vlatko Vuković and the knez Pavle Radinović were sent against Radič in December 1391 after receiving the stanak's blessings. The two captured Radič and occupied Konavli, dividing it between themselves, despite protests from Ragusa.

After Vlatko Vuković died sometime between August 1392 - August 1393, he was succeeded by his nephew the Grand Duke of Bosnia, Sandalj Hranić, who continued struggle against Radič, who regained his freedom in 1398, immediately seeking to restore his lost lands, becoming an important ally of the King Stjepan Ostoja.

Radič participated in the Bosnian-Dubrovnik War in 1403-1404, leading the attacks on Dubrovnik in the name of the King Stjepan Ostoja. Sandalj captured Radič, took all of his land, and after blinding him he throw him in prison, where Radić died in 1404 marking the end of the Sanković family.

When Sandalj died, Stjepan Vukčić, as Sandalj's nephew, inherited lordship over the Hum, and was the last Bosnian nobleman who had effective control over the province (zemlja) before Ottoman conquest. He titled himself Duke of Hum and Primorje, Bosnian Grand Duke, Knyaz of Drina, and later Herzog of Saint Sava, Lord of Hum and Bosnian Grand Duke, Knyaz of Drina and the rest. Following the Ottomans conquest and fall of Bosnian Kingdom, Hum or Humska zemlja became known as Hercegovina (transl. Herzegovina), which literally means "Herzog's land".

Kosača symbols during Stjepan Vukčić

The name "Herzegovina", which still exists with the name Bosnia and Herzegovina, is the most-important and indelible legacy of Stjepan Vukčić Kosača; it is unique within the Serbo-Croatian-speaking Balkans, because one person gave his noble title, which in the last few years of his life became inseparable from his name, to a region previously called Humska zemlja or Hum. The Ottoman custom of calling newly acquired lands by the names of their earlier rulers was of decisive importance. Also, Stjepan did not establish this province as a feudal and political unit of the Bosnian state; that honor befell Grand Duke of Bosnia Vlatko Vuković, who received it from King Tvrtko I; Sandalj Hranić expanded it and reaffirmed the Kosača family's supremacy.

In 1451, Stjepan attacked and laid siege to the city of Dubrovnik. He had earlier been made a nobleman of the Republic of Ragusa, so consequently, the Ragusan government now proclaimed him a traitor. A reward of 15,000 ducats, a palace in Dubrovnik worth 2,000 ducats, and an annual income of 300 ducats was offered to anyone who would kill him, along with the promise of hereditary Ragusan nobility which also helped hold this promise to whoever did the deed. The threat worked and Stjepan eventually raised the siege.

Stjepan Vukčić died in 1466 and was succeeded as herceg by his second-youngest son Vlatko Hercegović, who struggled to retain as much of the territory as he could. In 1471, the Ottomans excluded Hum from the Bosnian Sanjak and established a new, separate Sanjak of Herzegovina with its seat in Foča.

In November 1481, Ajaz-Bey of the Sanjak of Herzegovina besieged Vlatko's capital Novi but just before 14 December 1481, Vlatko ceased resisting and agreed with the Ottomans to move with his family to Istanbul. Now the entirety of Herzegovina was reorganized into the already established Sanjak of Herzegovina with the seat in Foča, and later, in 1580, would become one of the sanjaks of the Bosnia Eyalet. This signified the disappearance of the last-remaining independent point of the medieval Bosnian state.

=== Ottoman period ===
Flag of the Herzegovina Eyalet (1833–1851)

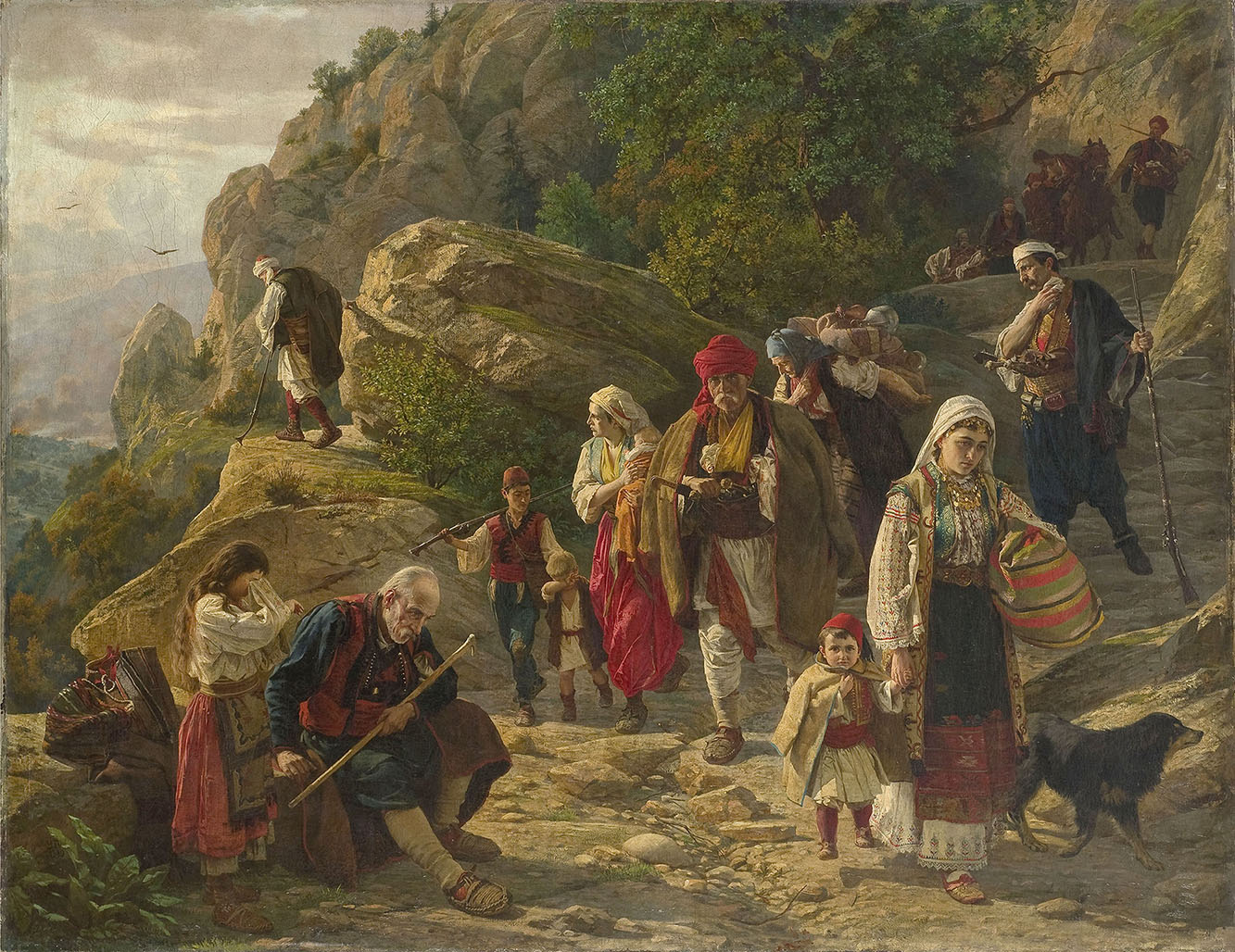
Refugees from the Herzegovina Uprising by Uroš Predić

In 1482, the lands of Stefan Vukčić's successors were occupied by Ottoman forces. The Ottomans were the first to begin officially using the name Herzegovina (Hersek) for the region.

The Bosnian beylerbey Isa-beg Ishaković mentioned the name in a letter from 1454. In the Ottoman Empire, Herzegovina was organized as a sanjak, the Sanjak of Herzegovina, within the Bosnia Eyalet. According to the Turkish census of Herzegovina from 1477, some villages were mentioned as being "in the possession of Vlachs," while others, were listed as "Serb settlements" and mostly deserted. According to Ottoman defters, at the end of the 15th century in Herzegovina were at least 35,000 Vlachs.

During the Long War (1591–1606), Serbs rose up in Herzegovina (1596–97), but they were quickly suppressed after their defeat at the field of Gacko.

The Candian War of 1645 to 1669 caused great damage to the region as the Republic of Venice and the Ottoman Empire fought for control over Dalmatia and coastal Herzegovina.

As a result of the Treaty of Karlowitz of 1699, the Ottomans gained access to the Adriatic Sea through the Neum-Klek coastal area. The Republic of Dubrovnik ceded this to distance themselves from the Venetian Republic's influence. The Ottomans benefitted from this in gaining the region's salt.

As a result of the Bosnian Uprising (1831–32), the Vilayet was split to form the separate Herzegovina Eyalet, ruled by semi-independent vizier Ali-paša Rizvanbegović. After his death in 1851, the eyalets of Bosnia and Herzegovina were merged.

The new joint entity was after 1853 commonly referred to as Bosnia and Herzegovina. Serbs in the region revolted against the Ottomans (1852–62) and were aided by the Montenegrins, who sought the liberation of the Serb people from Ottoman rule.

The Herzegovinian Serbs frequently rose up against the Ottoman rule; culminating in the Herzegovina Uprising (1875-78), which was supported by the Principality of Serbia and Montenegro.

Montenegro did succeed in liberating and annexing large parts of Herzegovina before the Berlin Congress of 1878, including the Nikšić area; the historical Herzegovina region annexed to Montenegro is known as East or Old Herzegovina.

=== Modern history ===
Flag of Herzegovina, during the Austro-Hungarian rule in Bosnia and Herzegovina (1878–1918)

As a result of the Treaty of Berlin (1878), Herzegovina, along with Bosnia, were occupied by Austria-Hungary, only nominally remaining under Ottoman rule.

The historical Herzegovina region in the Principality of Montenegro was known as East or Old Herzegovina. The Serb population of Herzegovina and Bosnia hoped for annexation to Serbia and Montenegro. The Franciscan order opened the first university in Herzegovina in 1895 in Mostar.

In 1908, Austria-Hungary annexed the province, leading to the Bosnian Crisis, an international dispute which nearly triggered a general war and was an important step in the buildup of international tensions during the years leading up to the First World War. The assassination of the Archduke Franz Ferdinand came as a direct result of the resentment of the Serbs of Bosnia and Herzegovina against Austro-Hungarian rule.

During World War I, Herzegovina was a scene of inter-ethnic conflict. During the war, the Austro-Hungarian government formed Šuckori, Muslim para-militia units. Šuckori units were especially active in Herzegovina. Persecution of Serbs conducted by the Austro-Hungarian authorities was the "first incidence of active 'ethnic cleansing' in Bosnia and Herzegovina".

In 1918, Herzegovina became a part of the newly formed Kingdom of Serbs, Croats and Slovenes (later renamed Kingdom of Yugoslavia). In 1941 Herzegovina fell under the governance of the fascist axis puppet state Independent State of Croatia (NDH). During World War II, Herzegovina was a battleground between fascist Croat Ustaše, royalist Serb Četniks, and the communist Yugoslav Partisans; Herzegovina was administratively divided into the counties of Hum and Dubrava by the NDH.

In 1945, Socialist Republic of Bosnia and Herzegovina became one of the republics of Socialist Federal Republic of Yugoslavia. It remained so until the breakup of Yugoslavia in the early 1990s. During the Bosnian War, large parts of western and central Herzegovina became part of the Croat republic of Herzeg-Bosnia (which later joined the Federation of Bosnia and Herzegovina) while eastern Herzegovina became a part of the Serb republic of Republika Srpska.

== Geography ==
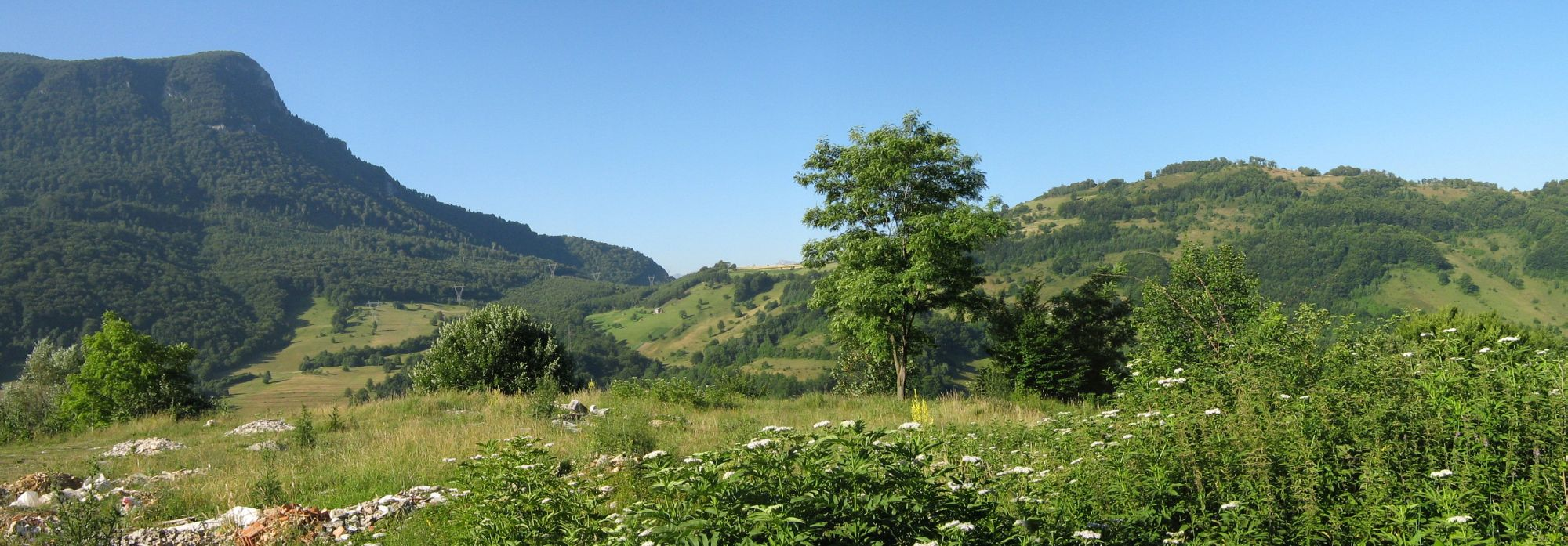
Herzegovina in spring at Ivan Sedlo, mountain pass between Ivan and Bjelašnica mountains

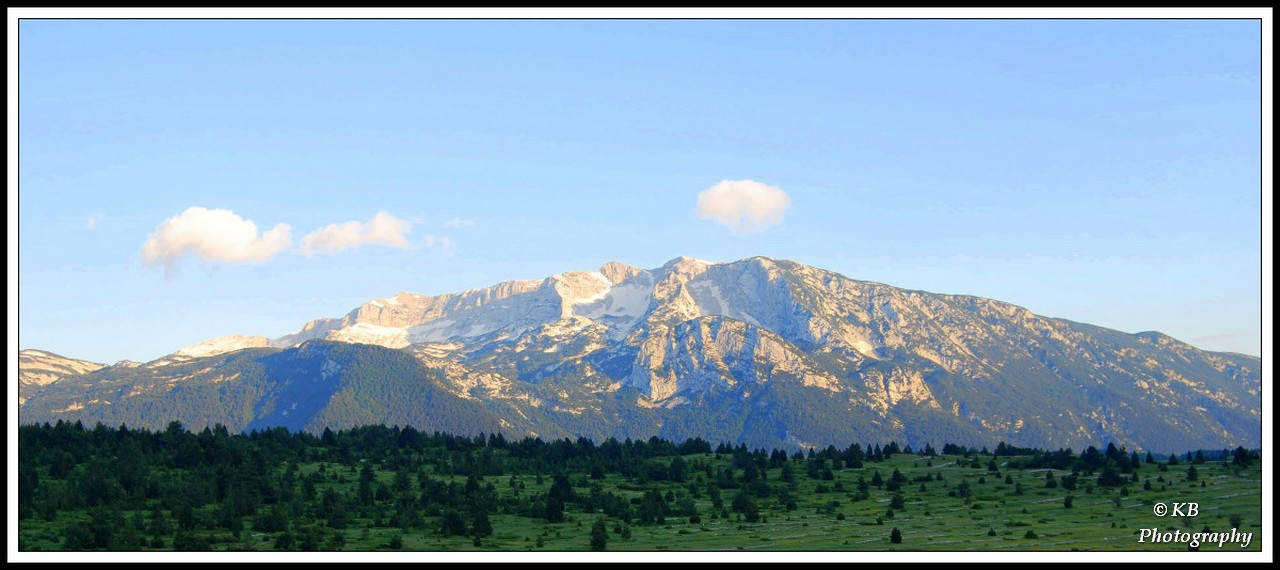
Western slopes of Čvrsnica, as seen from the Blidinje Plateau

Herzegovina is a southern region of Bosnia and Herzegovina. Its borders and territory have never been strictly defined, be it geographically or culturally, nor has there ever been a geopolitical and economic subdivision of Bosnia and Herzegovina bearing the name.

The larger of two Bosnia and Herzegovina regions, Bosnia, is to the west and north of Herzegovina, and the border between two regions, Herzegovina and Bosnia, is unclear as it has never been strictly defined. To the south-southwest of region lies Croatian region of Dalmatia, and to the east-southeast is Montenegro.

The land area is c. 11,500 km^{2} (4,400 sq mi), or around 23% of the total area of the present-day Bosnia and Herzegovina, to c. 12,300 km^{2} (4,700 sq mi), or around 24% of the country.

It borders the Adriatic Sea along its 20 km (12 mi) coastline.

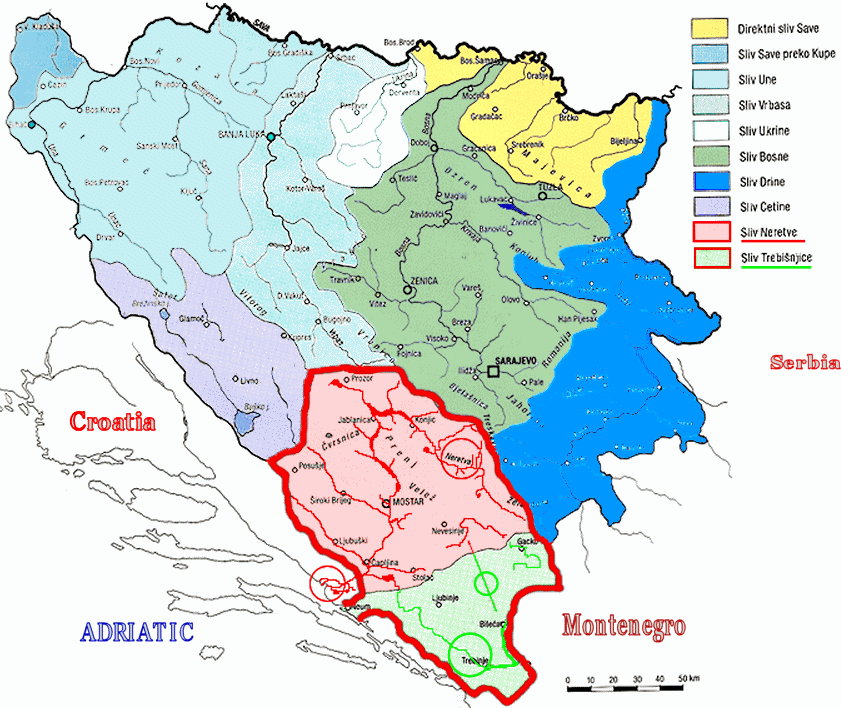
The Neretva and Trebišnjica river watersheds (in red and green respectively), which are roughly conterminous with the region of Herzegovina. The Cetina watershed (northwest of the Neretva watershed), which similarly feeds into the Adriatic, is also sometimes included.

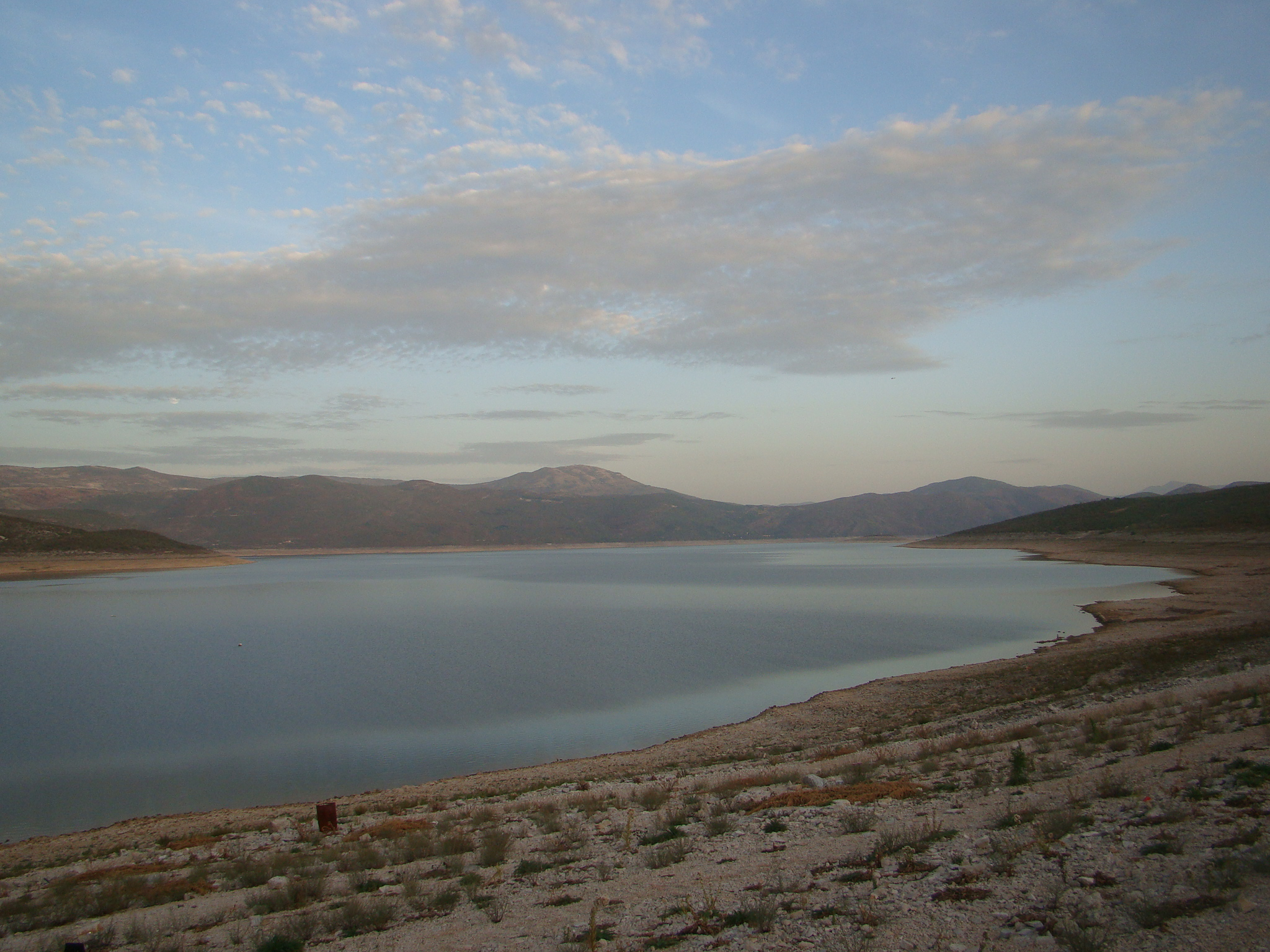
Bilećko Lake

The terrain of Herzegovina is mostly hilly karst with high mountains in the north such as Čvrsnica and Prenj, except for the central valley of the river Neretva. The upper reaches of the River Neretva lie in northern Herzegovina, a heavily forested area with fast-flowing rivers and high mountains. Konjic and Jablanica lie in this area.

The Neretva rises on Lebršnik Mountain, close to the Montenegro border, and as the river flows west, it enters Herzegovina. The entire upper catchment of the Neretva constitutes a precious ecoregion with many endemic and endangered species. The river carves through the precipitous karst terrain, providing excellent opportunities for rafting and kayaking, while the spectacular scenery of the surrounding mountains and forests is a challenging hiking terrain. The Neretva's tributaries in the upper reaches are mostly short, due to the mountainous terrain: the River Rakitnica has cut a deep canyon, its waters being one of the least explored areas in this part of Europe. The Rakitnica flows into Neretva upstream from Konjic. The Neretva then flows northwest, through Konjic. It enters the Jablanica Reservoir (Jablaničko jezero), one of the largest in Bosnia and Herzegovina. The lake ends near the town of Jablanica. From here on, the Neretva turns southward, continuing toward the Adriatic Sea. With the mountains lining its shores gradually receding, the Neretva enters a valley where the city of Mostar lies. It flows under the old bridge (Stari most) and continues, now wider, toward the town of Čapljina and the Neretva Delta in Croatia before emptying into the Adriatic Sea.

=== Cities and towns ===
The largest city is Mostar, in the center of the region. Other larger towns include Trebinje, Stolac, Široki Brijeg, Posušje, Ljubuški, Tomislavgrad, Grude, Konjic, and Čapljina.

Mostar is the best-known urban area and the unofficial capital. It is the only city with over 100,000 citizens. There are no other large cities in Herzegovina, though some have historical significance.

Stolac, for example, is perhaps Herzegovina's oldest city. Settlements date from the Paleolithic period (Badanj Cave). An Illyrian tribe lived in the city of Daorson. There were several Roman settlements alongside the Bregava River and medieval inhabitants left large stone grave monuments called stećak in Radimlja. Trebinje, on the Trebišnjica River, is the southernmost city in Bosnia and Herzegovina, near the Montenegro border.

Čapljina and Ljubuški are known for their history and their rivers; the village of Međugorje has religious importance for many Roman Catholics.

== Administration ==
In the modern state of Bosnia and Herzegovina, Herzegovina is divided between the countries' two major entities, Republika Srpska and the Federation of Bosnia and Herzegovina. Republika Srpska's part of Herzegovina, commonly referred to as East Herzegovina, or increasingly more often "Trebinje Region", is administratively divided into municipalities of Berkovići, Bileća, Gacko, Istočni Mostar, Ljubinje, Nevesinje, and Trebinje.

Within the Federation of Bosnia and Herzegovina, Herzegovina is administratively divided between the cantons of Herzegovina-Neretva and West Herzegovina; the two cantons only make mention of the region in relation to other locations or geographical features. Part of the region belongs to Canton 10.

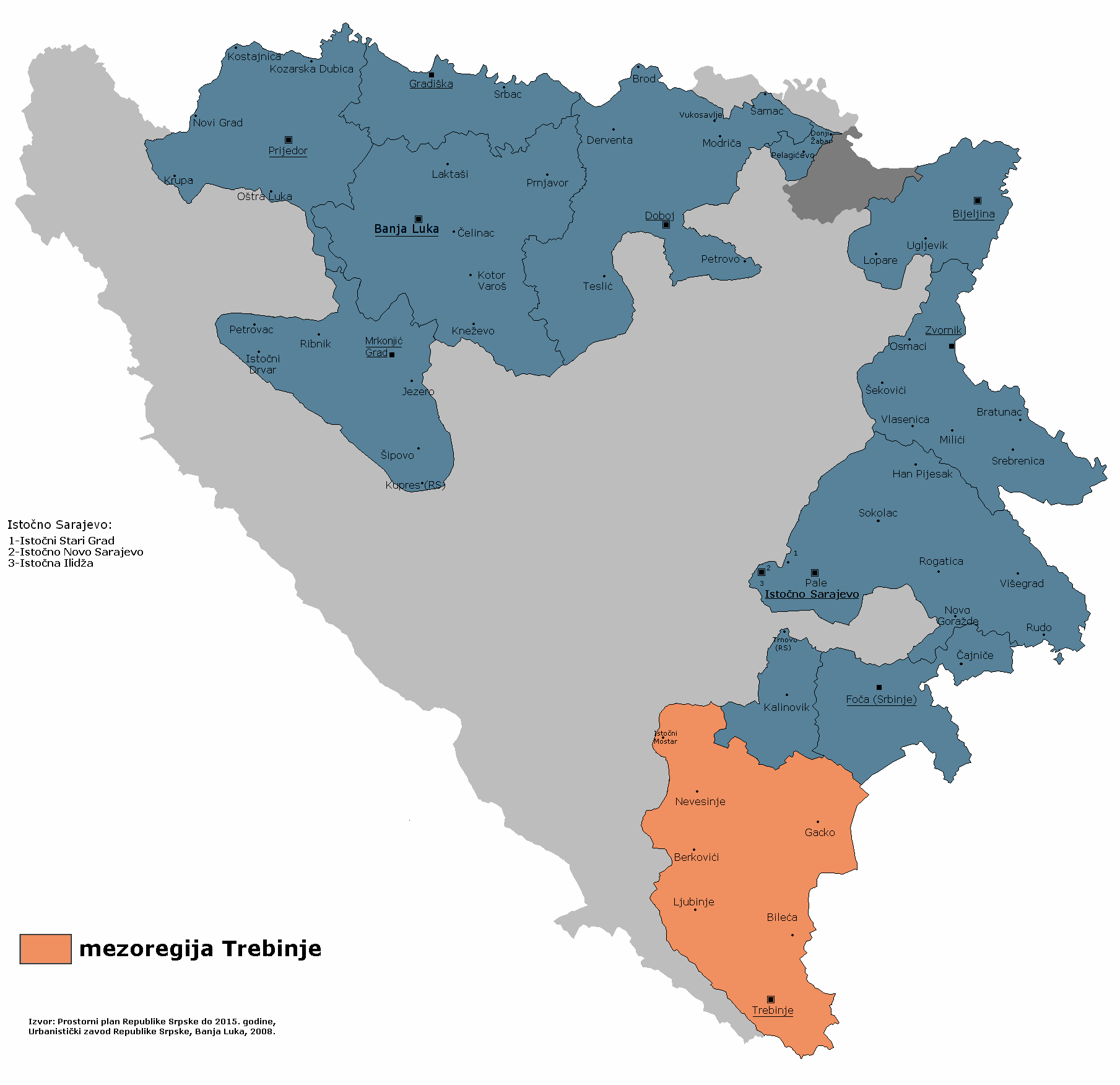
East Herzegovina or "Trebinje Region" in Republika Srpska

Herzegovina-Neretva Canton in Federation of Bosnia and Herzegovina

West Herzegovina Canton in Federation of Bosnia and Herzegovina

Canton 10 in Federation of Bosnia and Herzegovina

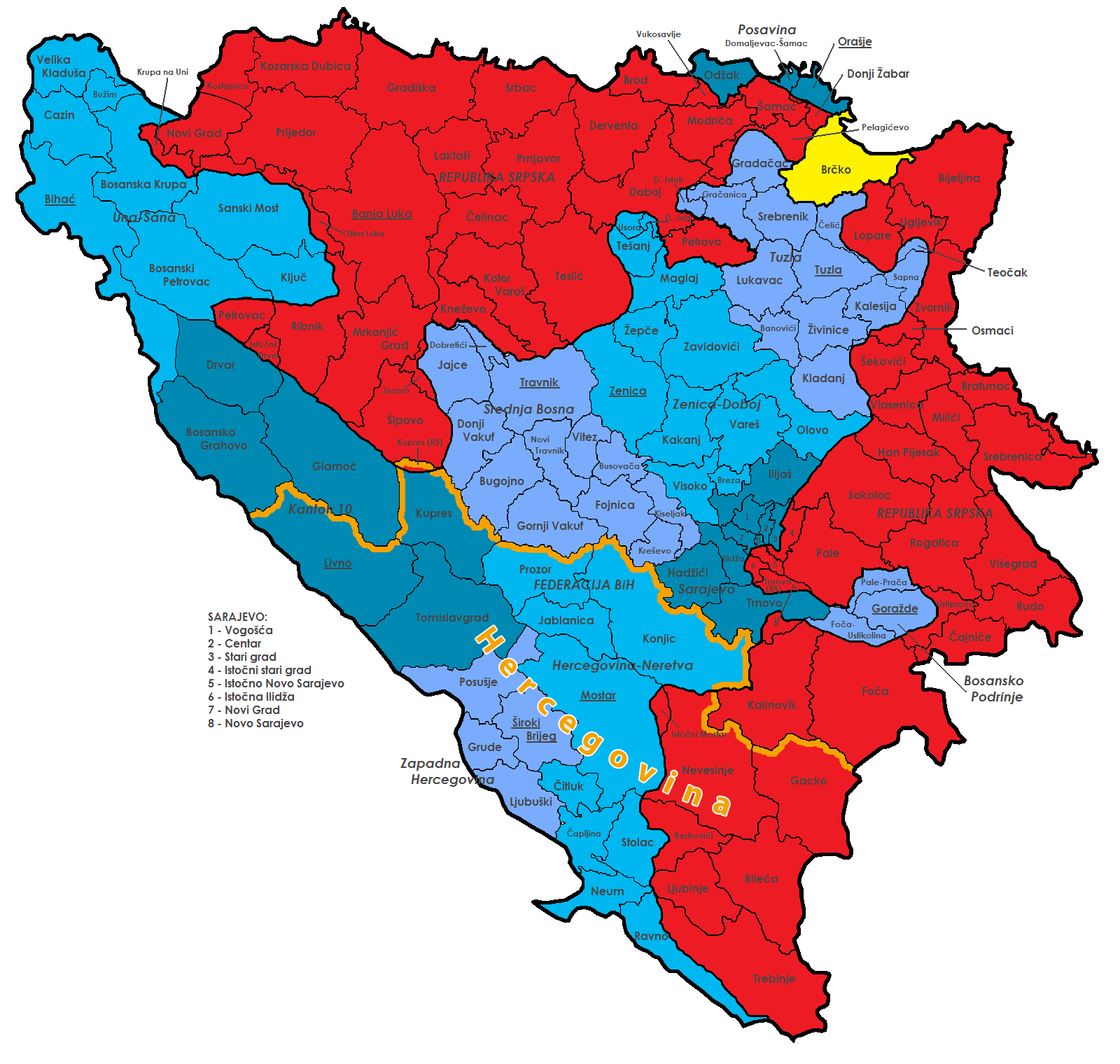
Economic region of Herzegovina, planned since 2013

== Population ==
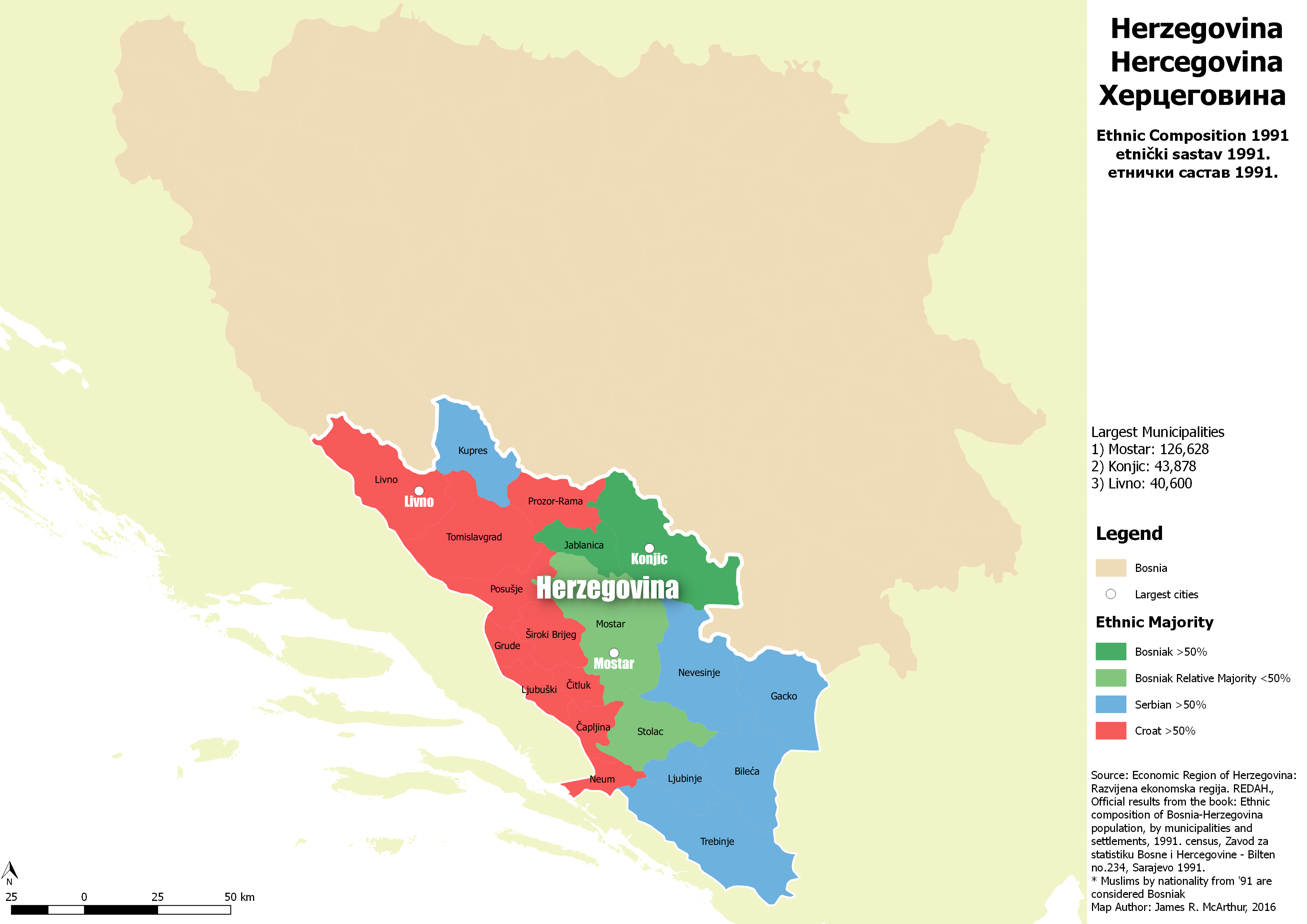
Ethnic composition of Herzegovina in 1991

The locals of Herzegovina are known by the demonym Herzegovinians (Hercegovci / Херцеговци; singular masculine: Hercegovac / Херцеговац, feminine: Hercegovka / Херцеговка). While the population of Herzegovina throughout history has been ethnically mixed, the Bosnian War in the 1990s resulted in mass ethnic cleansing and large-scale displacement of peoples. The last pre-war census in 1991 recorded a population of 437,095 inhabitants.

- Croats generally populate the areas closest to the Croatian border focused on Mostar, Ljubuški, Široki Brijeg, Čitluk, Grude, Posušje, Čapljina, Neum, Stolac, Ravno, and Prozor-Rama.
- Bosniaks mainly live in the areas along the Neretva, such as Mostar, Konjic and Jablanica, to a significant extent in Stolac, Čapljina, Prozor-Rama, and to a lesser extent in Nevesinje, Gacko, Trebinje.
- Serbs are the majority in East Herzegovina, including the municipalities of Berkovići, Bileća, Gacko, Istočni Mostar, Ljubinje, Nevesinje, and Trebinje.

The demographic makeup of West Herzegovina Canton, Herzegovina-Neretva Canton and East Herzegovina according to the 2013 census is:

Ethnic Composition
Ethnic Group	Number	Percentage
Croats	212,428	55.2%
Bosniaks	94,895	24.7%
Serbs	70,952	18.4%
Others	6,483	1.7%
Total	384,743	100%

== Culture ==
=== Monuments ===
The region has rich history and diverse culture, with variety of important monuments of cultural-historical heritage, such as the following cultural monuments; Mogorjelo, Stari most, Stećci and Tekija.

=== Religion ===
The Constitution of Bosnia and Herzegovina guarantees freedom of religion,

- Islam (See: Islamic Community of Bosnia and Herzegovina)
- Eparchy of Zahumlje and Herzegovina of the Serbian Orthodox Church
- Roman Catholic Diocese of Mostar-Duvno and Roman Catholic Diocese of Trebinje-Mrkan

=== Music ===
- Ganga
- Gusle
- Sevdalinka
Traditional costumes of Herzegovina
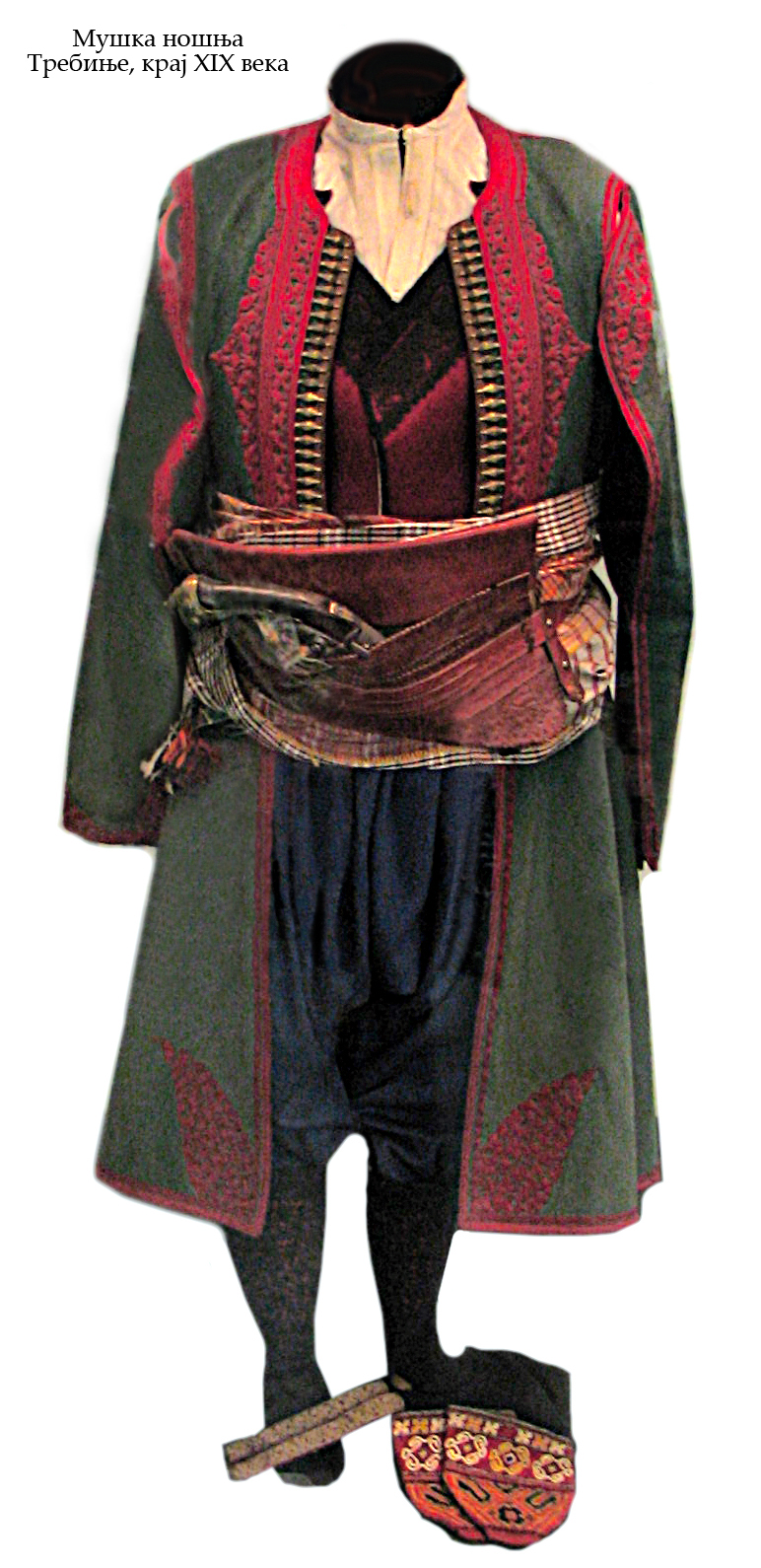
Serb traditional costume from Trebinje and Eastern Herzegovina

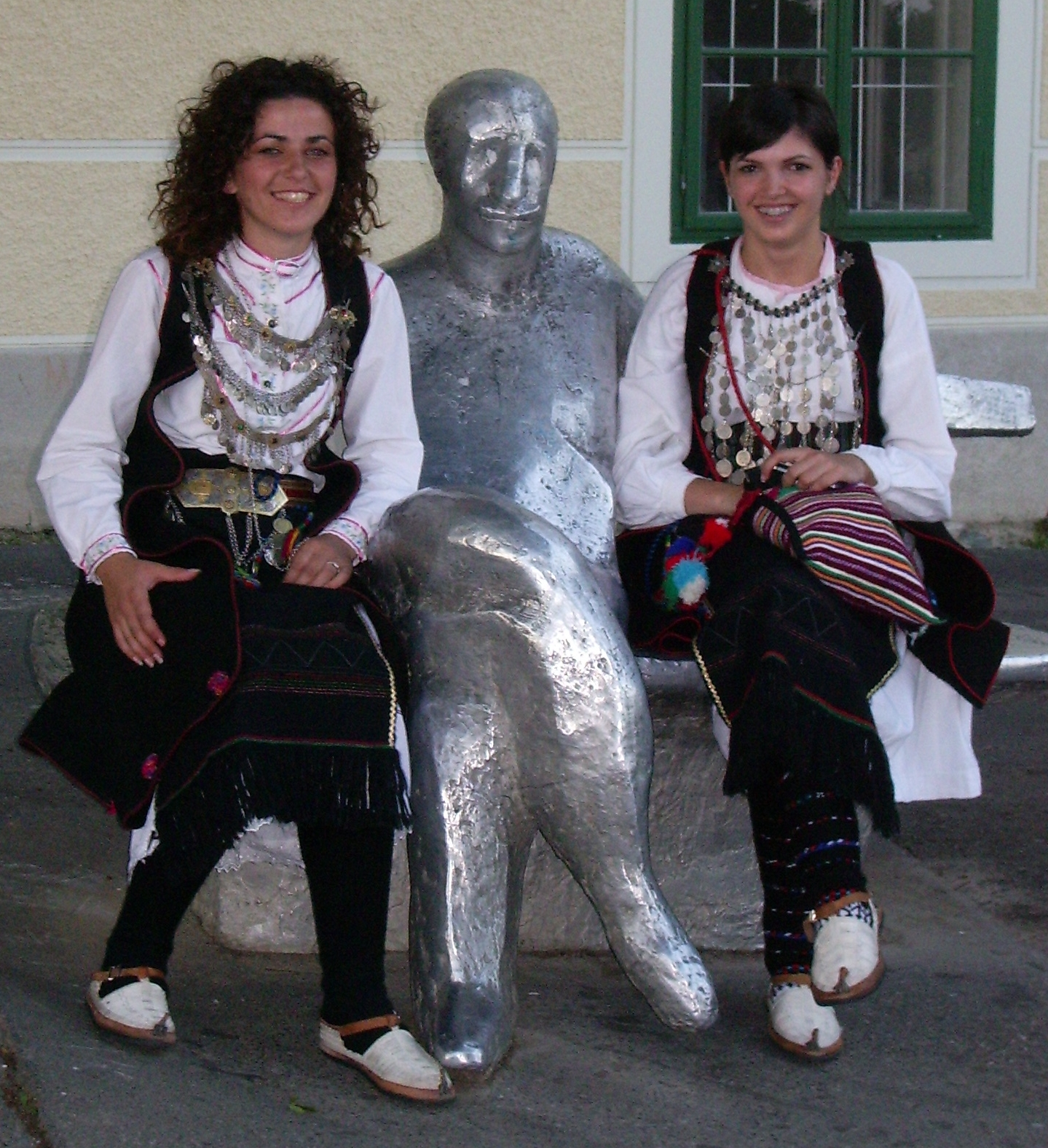
Folk costumes of Croatian women from Tomislavgrad Hercegovina.

== Tourism ==
In 2013, tourist cluster Herzegovina was established since Herzegovina didn't have a regional tourist organisation. It includes members from three counties in southern Bosnia and Herzegovina: Herzegovina-Neretva (in which Mostar and Međugorje are also located and have the most tourist traffic), Canton 10 (Livno, Tomislavgrad) and West Herzegovina as well as part of the Republic of Srpska (such as Trebinje).

Herzegovina's natural landmarks include many features.

- The falls of Kravica, on the Trebižat river, consist of several waterfalls near the city of Ljubuški and a popular spot for the local people to take a bath in the hot weather.
- The Hutovo Blato is a bird reserve, one of the most important in Europe and a gathering place for many international ornithologists.
- Vjetrenica is a cave system and a unique ecosystem. It is located near the border with Croatia, in Popovo Polje in the Ravno municipality. The cave has not been explored totally yet, but it is open to visitors. A large number of endemic cave-dwelling species have been discovered there, and new ones can be expected to be discovered still.
- Blagaj is also known as the origin of the Buna River, inside a cave system.
- Neum at the Adriatic Sea, Bosnia and Herzegovina's only coastal town, is also a tourist destination.
- Međugorje has one of the most visited sites in Bosnia and Herzegovina.

== Image gallery ==
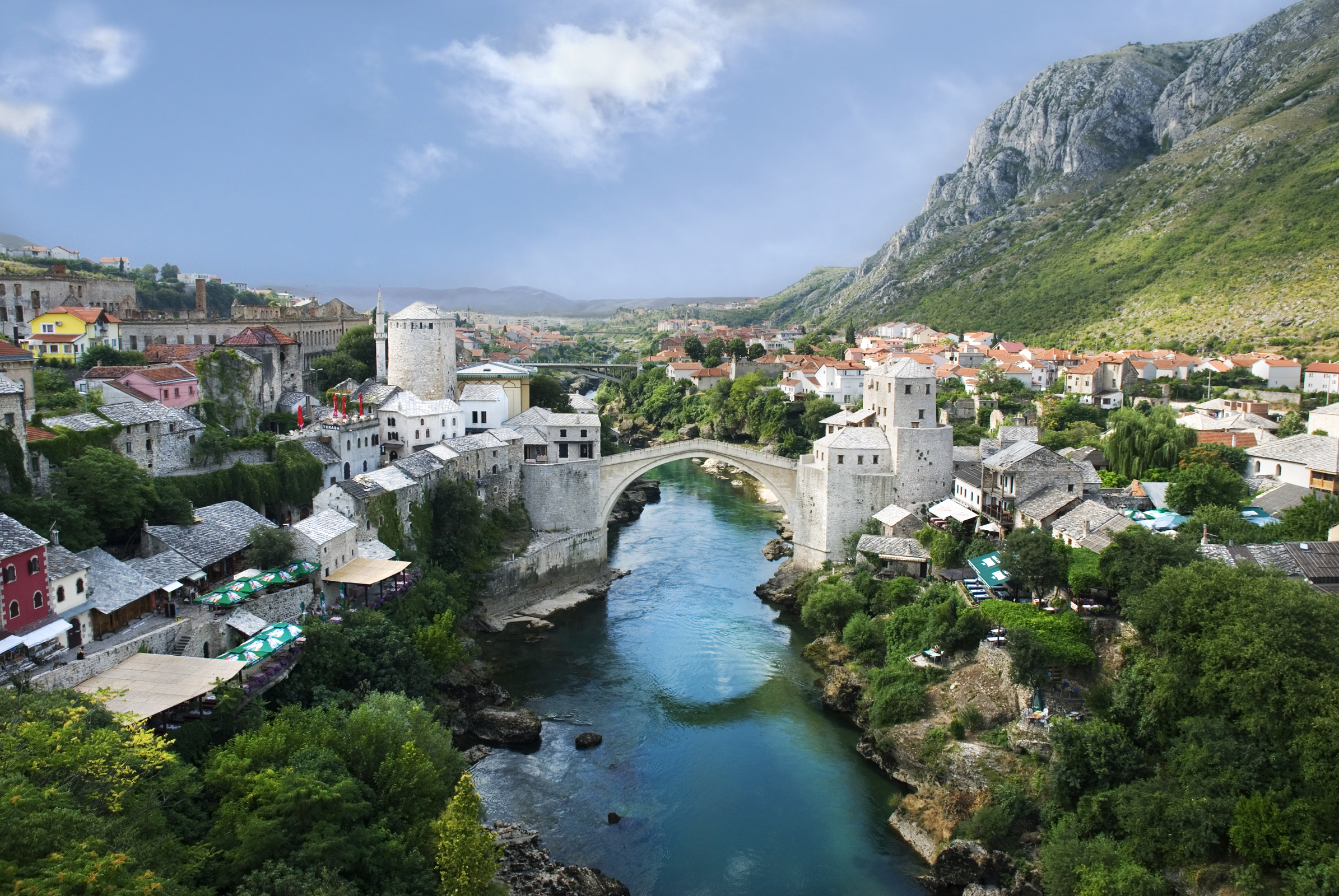
Mostar

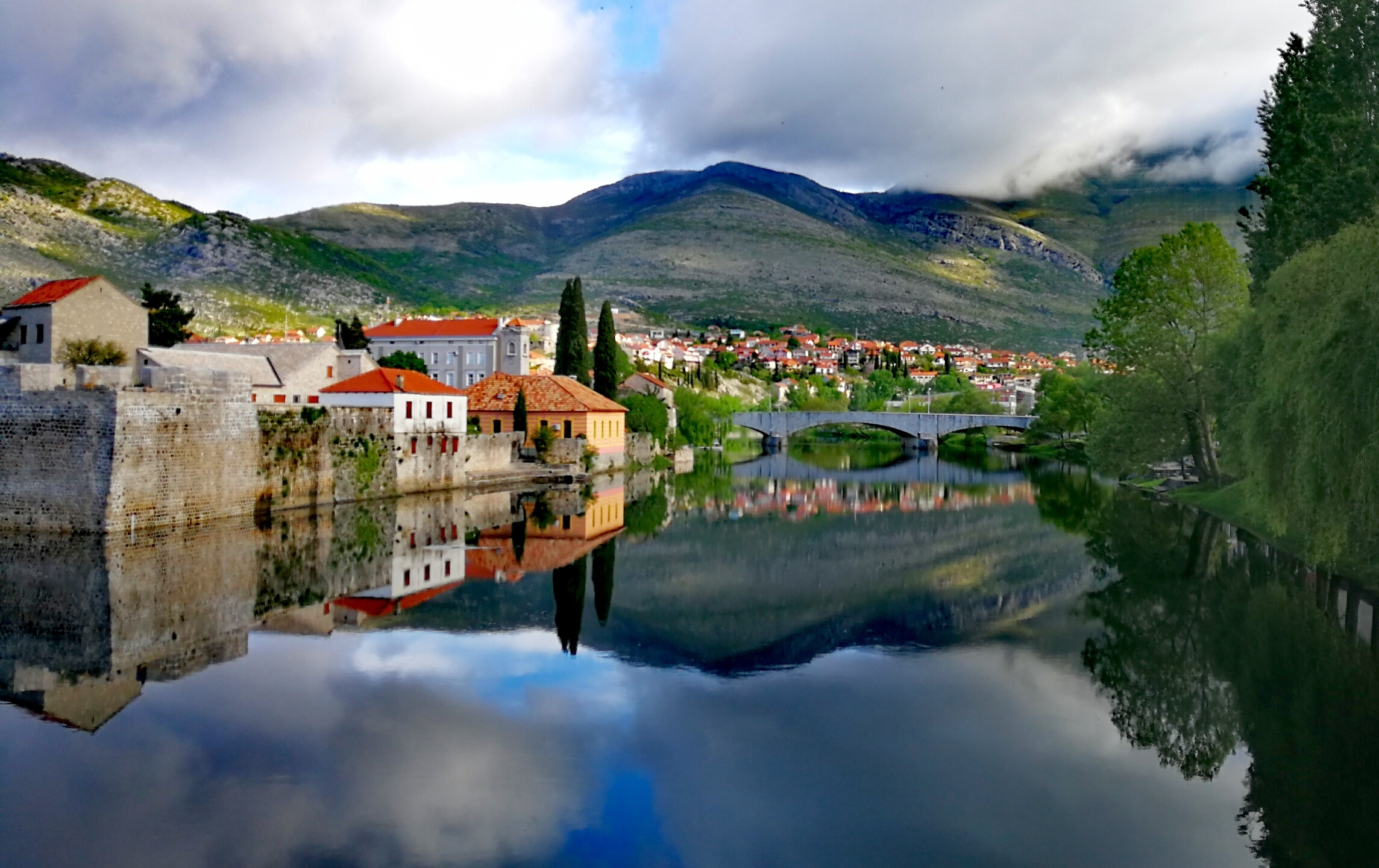
Trebinje

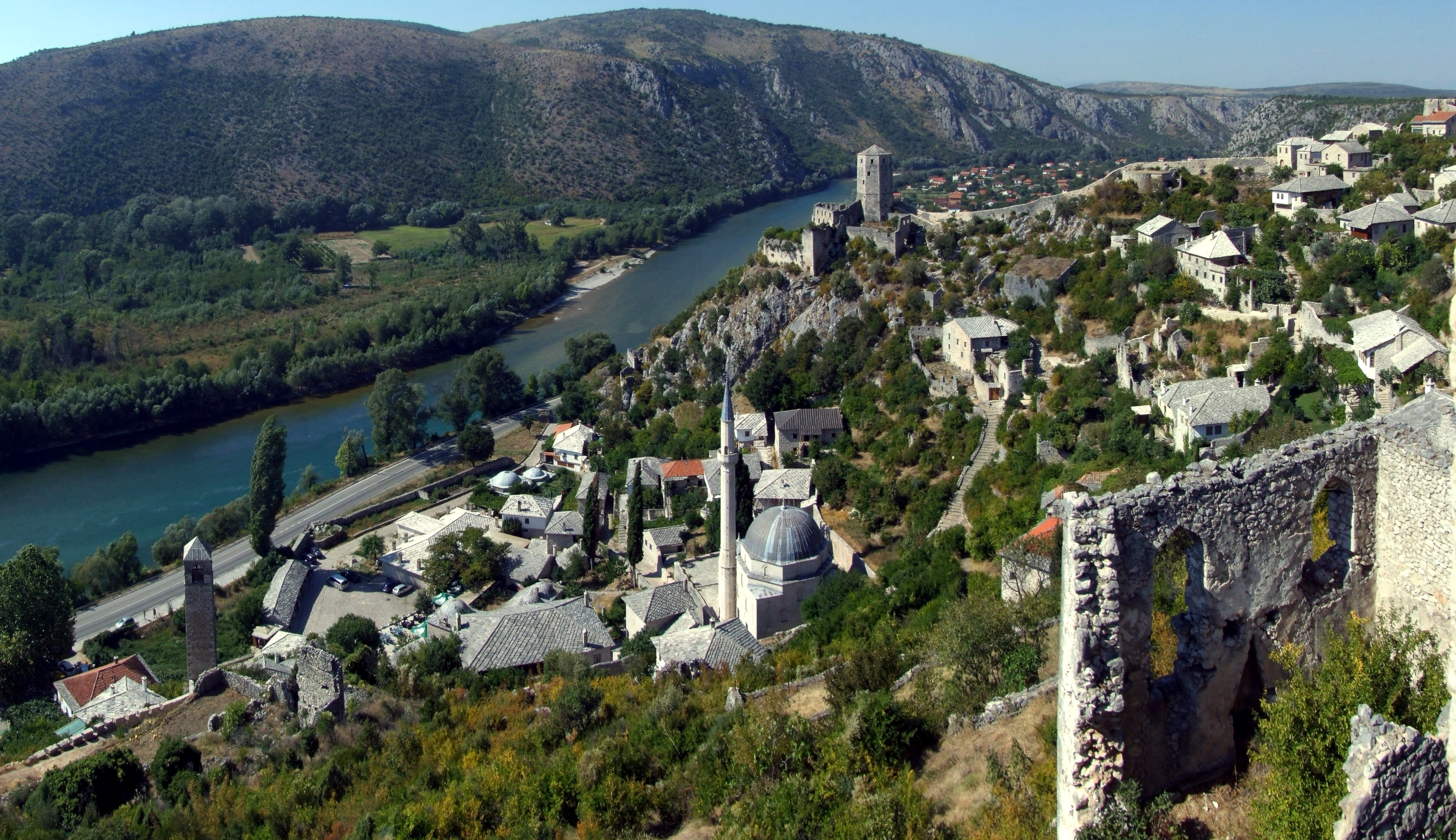
Počitelj

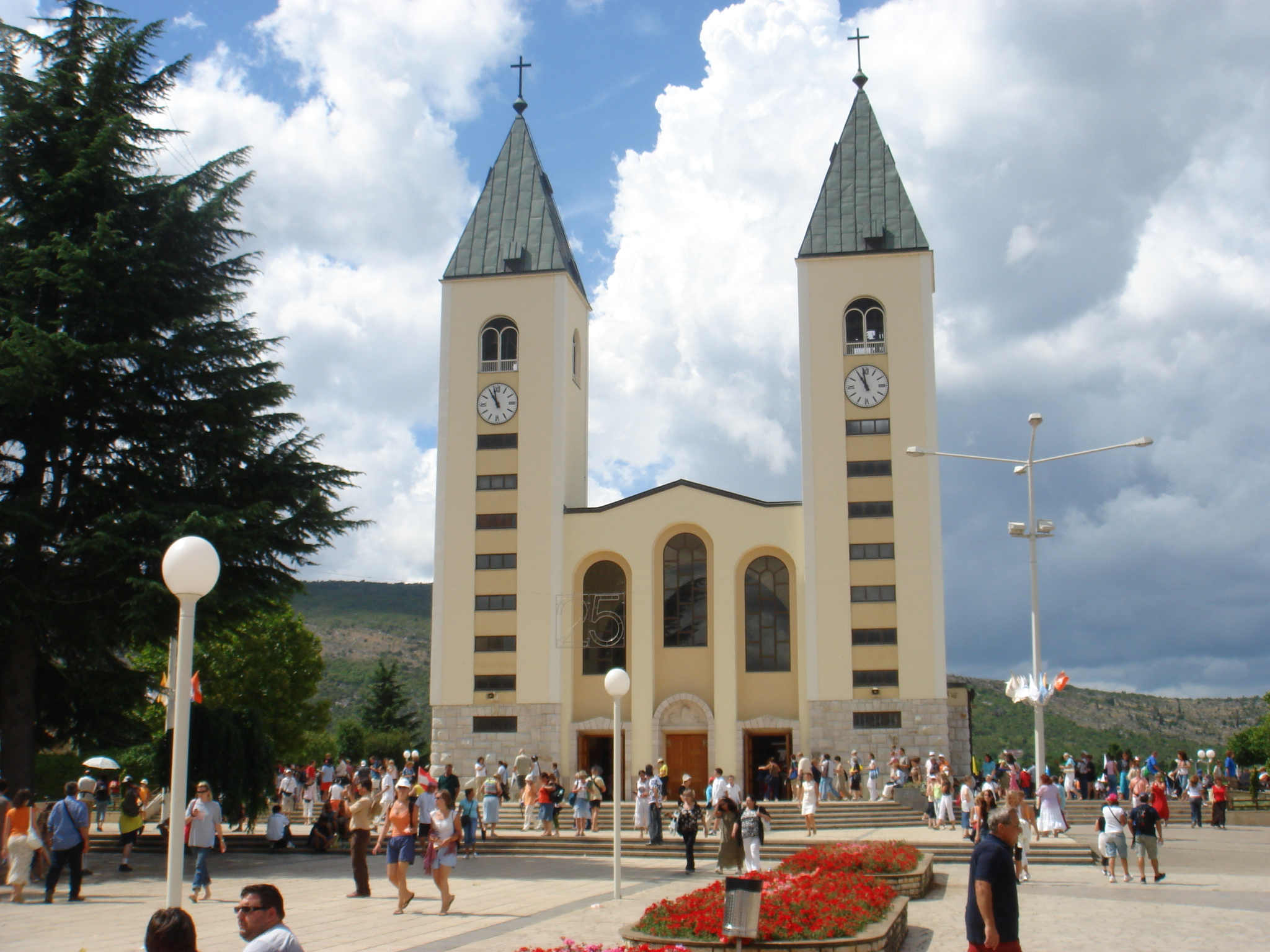
Medjugorje

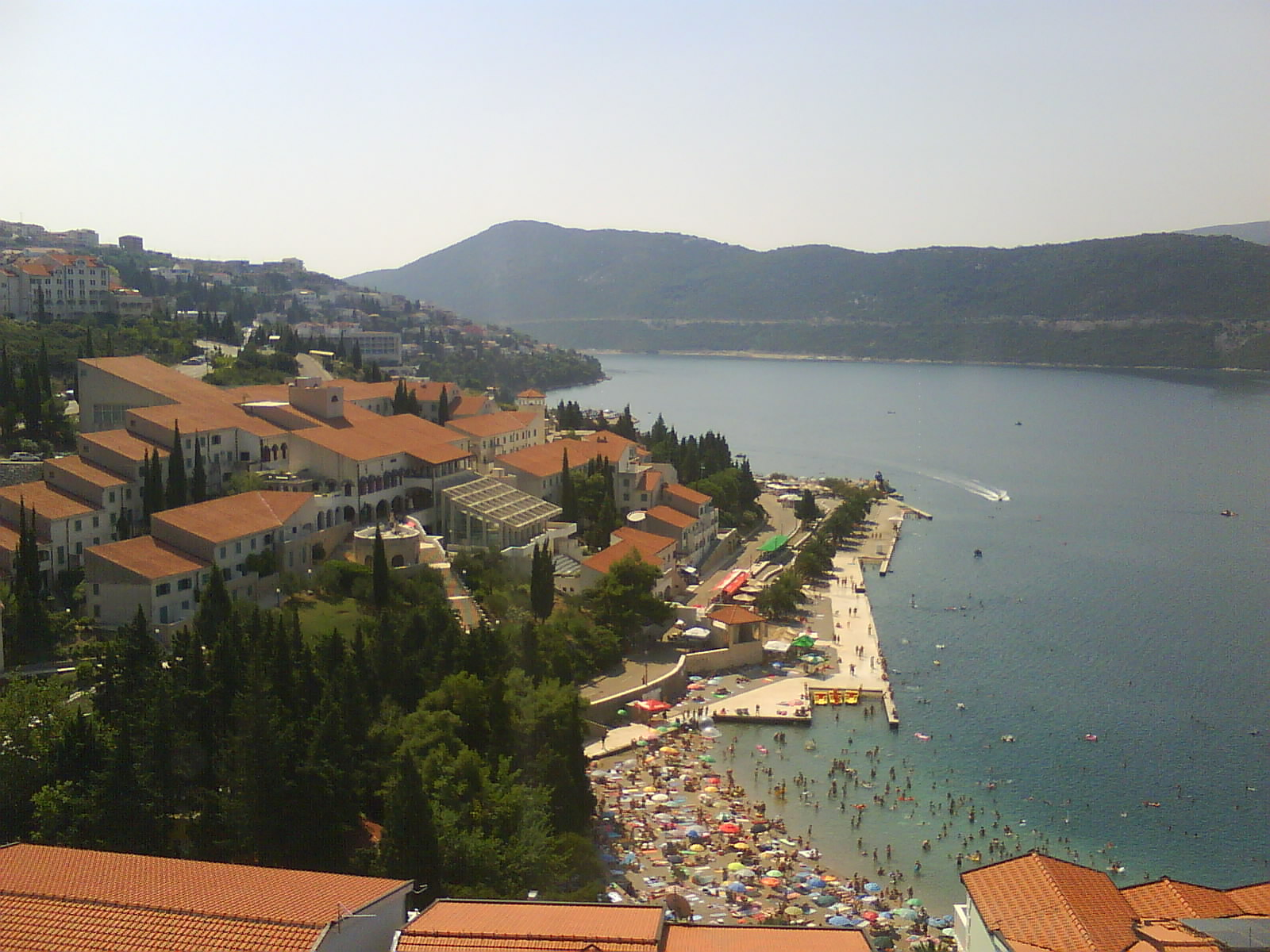
Neum

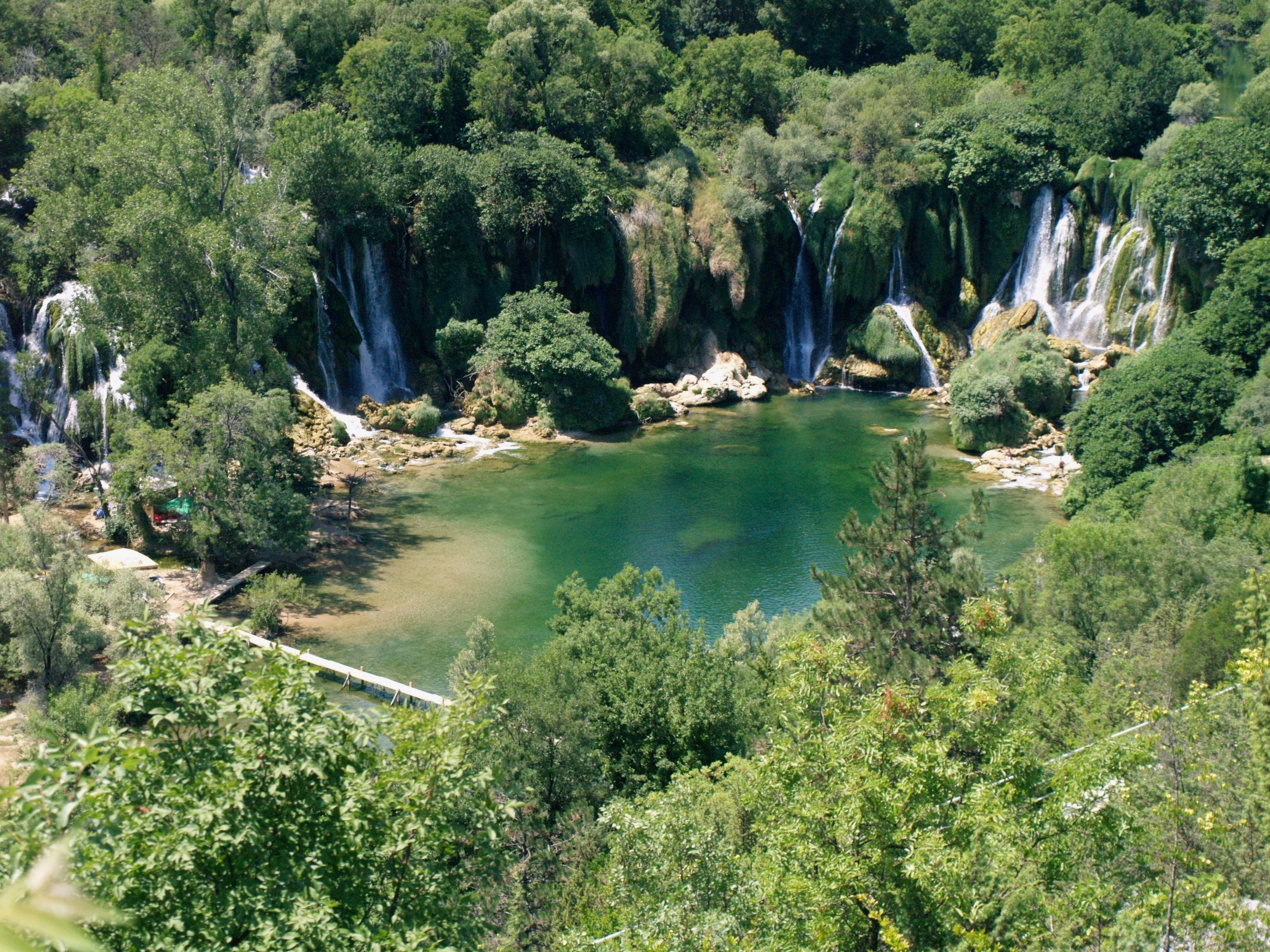
Kravice Waterfalls

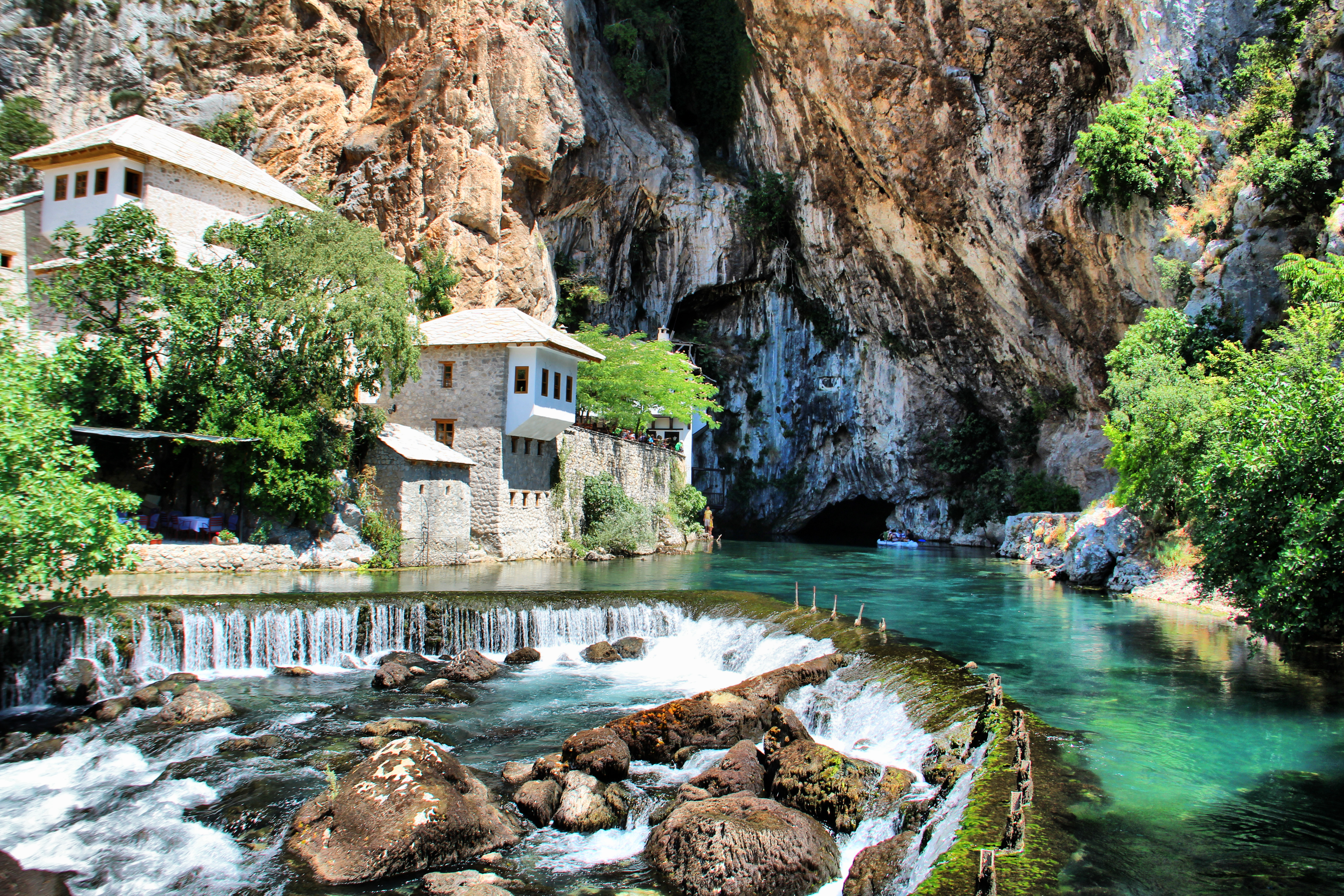
Blagaj Tekija

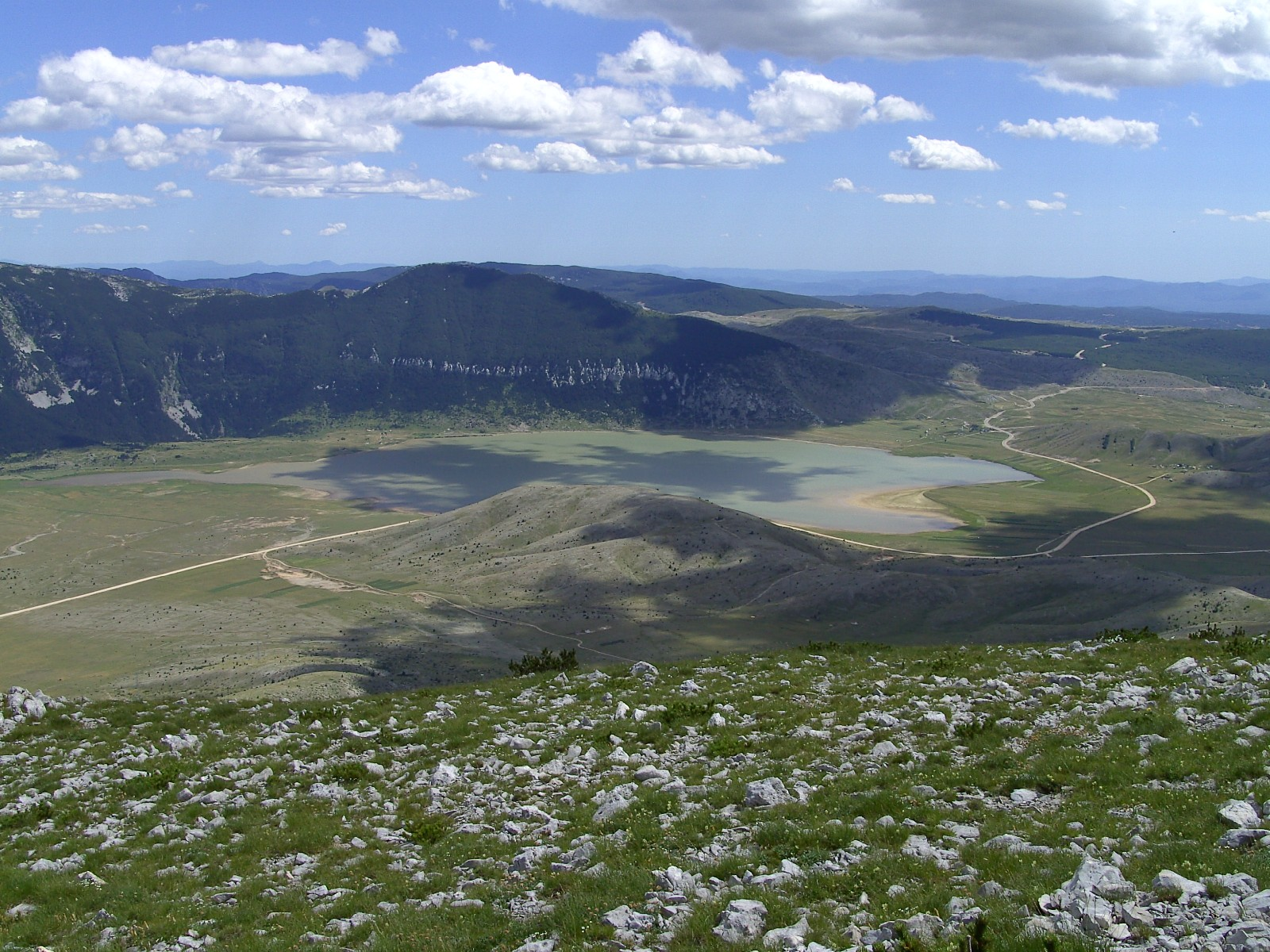
Blidinje Nature Park

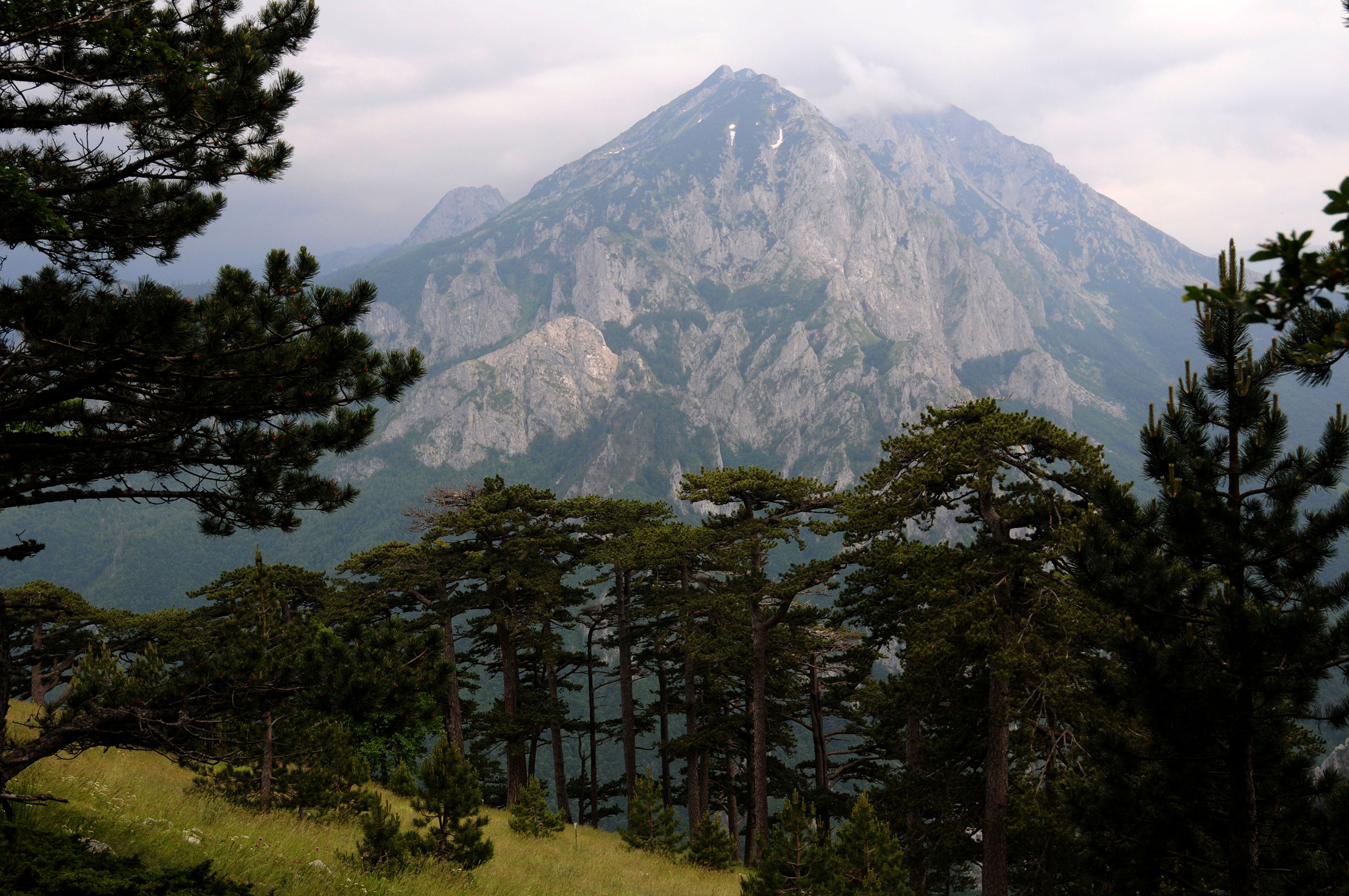
Volujak Mountain

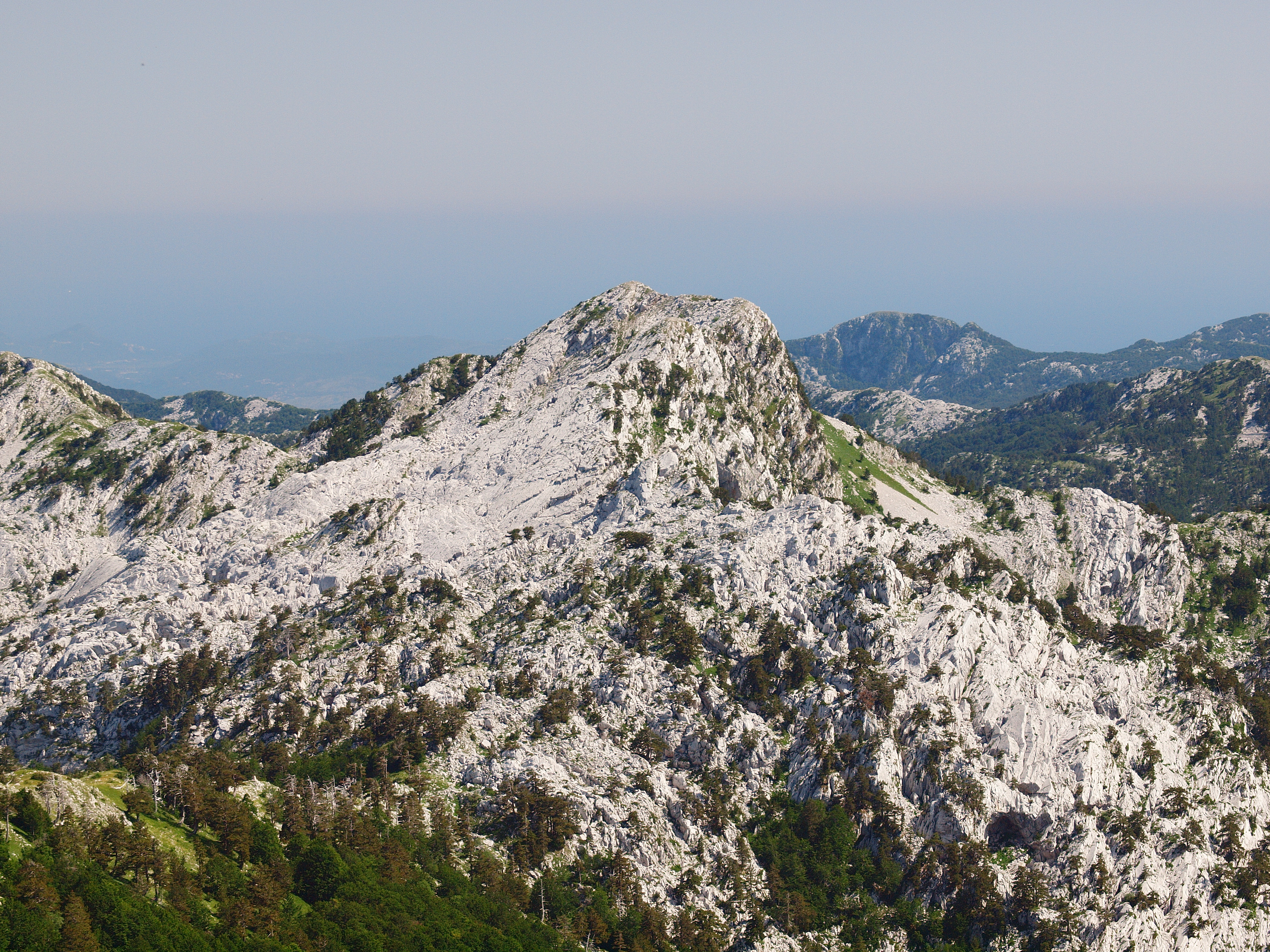
Orjen Mountain

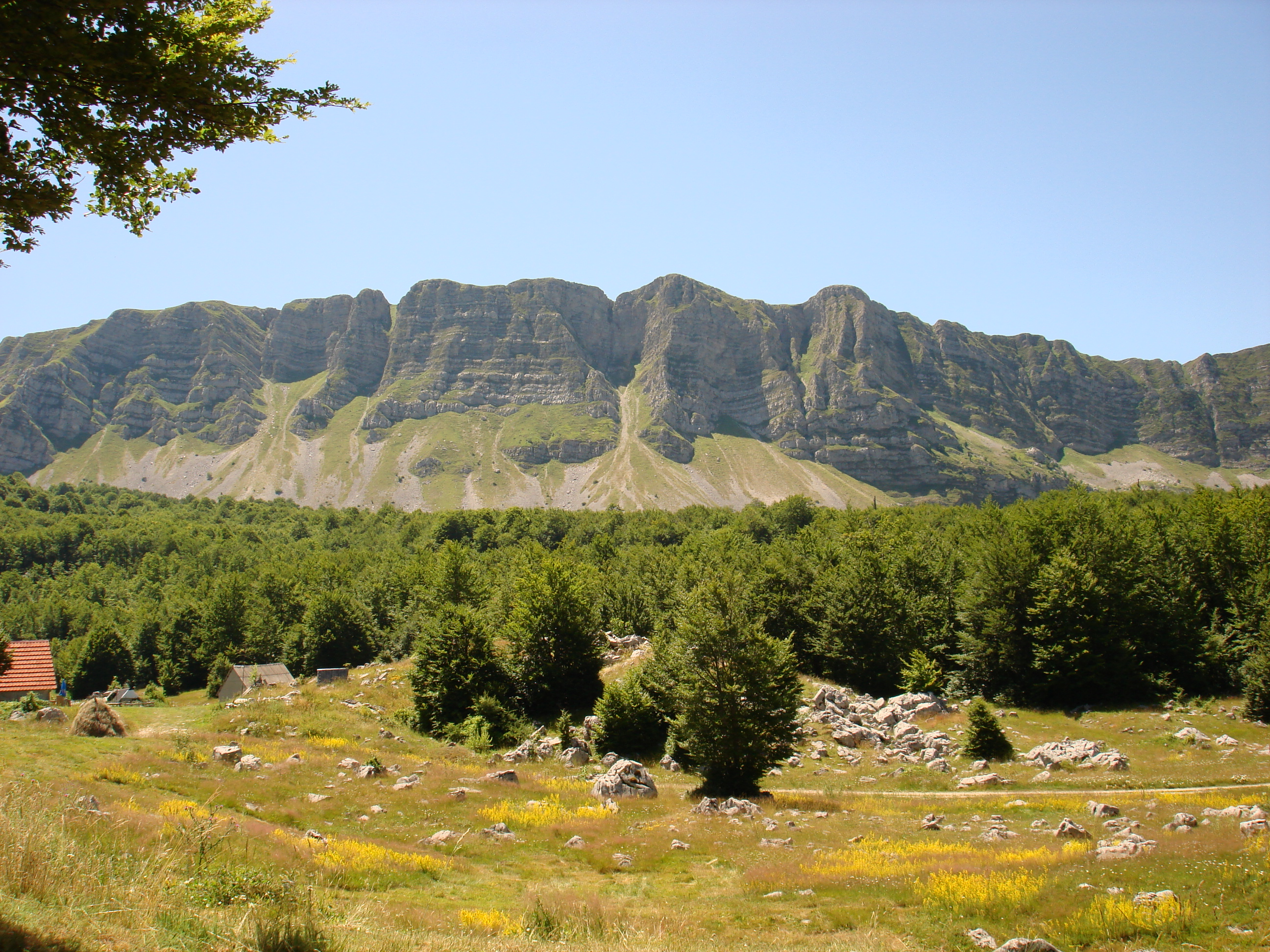
Lebršnik Mountain

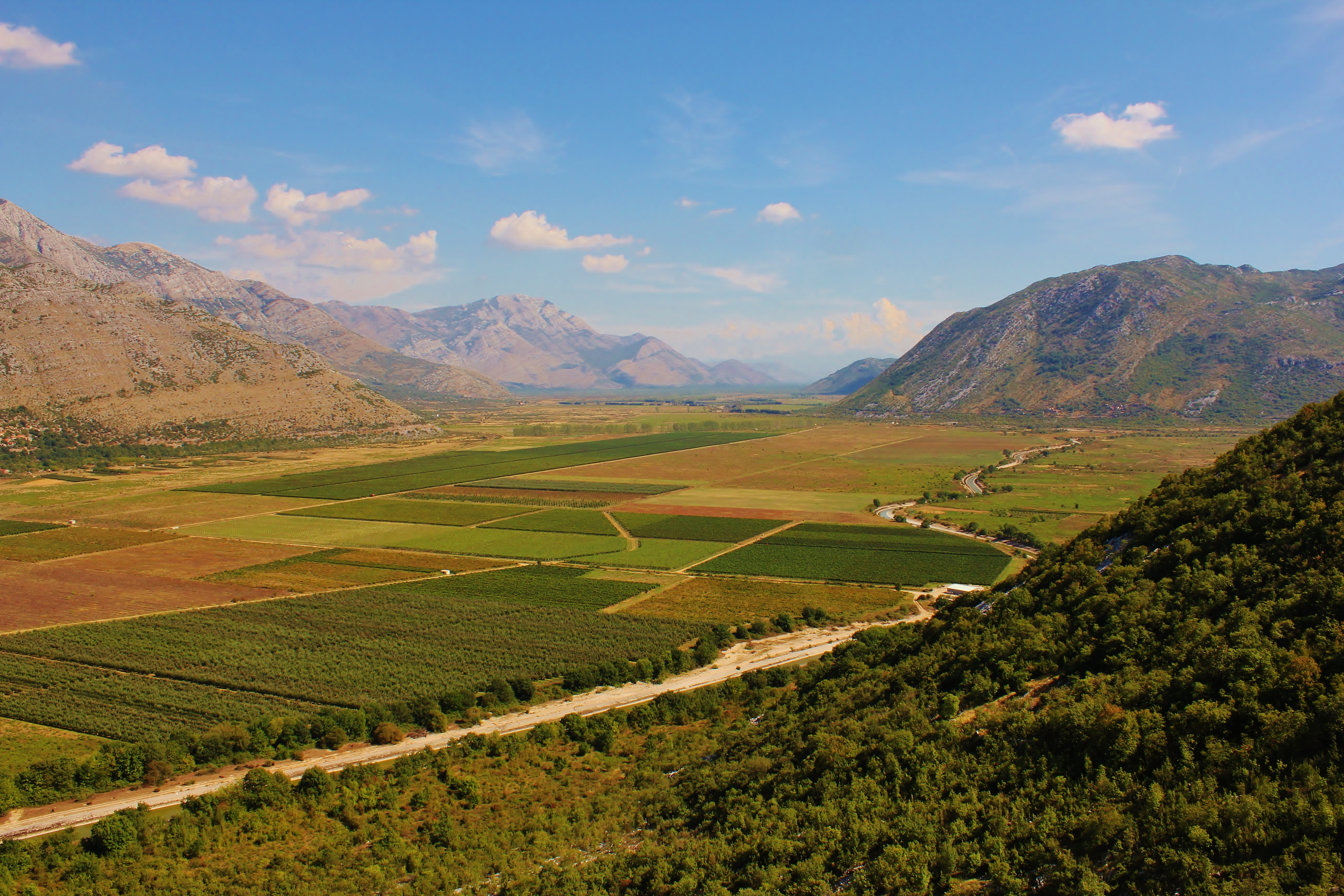
Popovo Polje

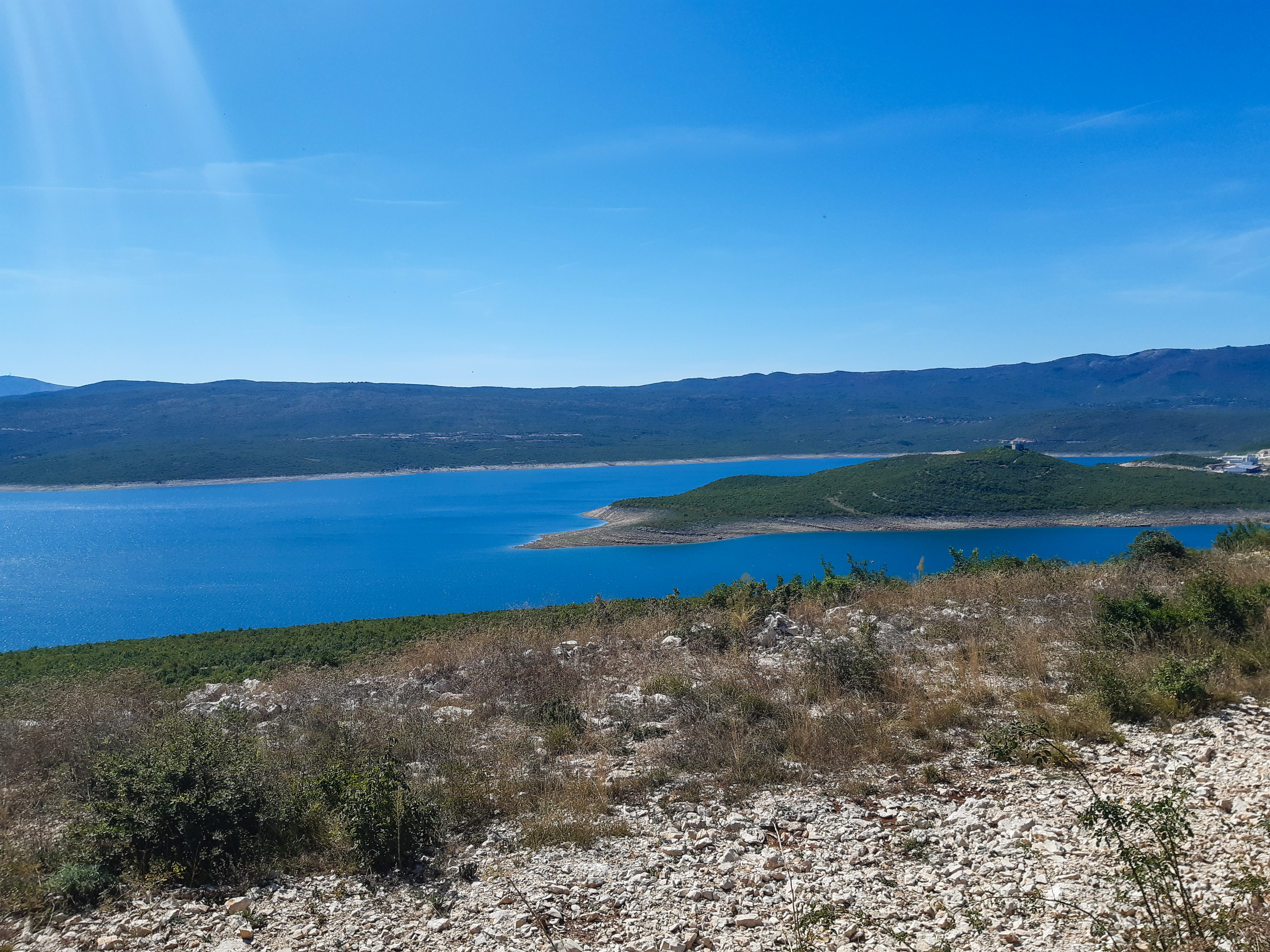
Bileća Lake

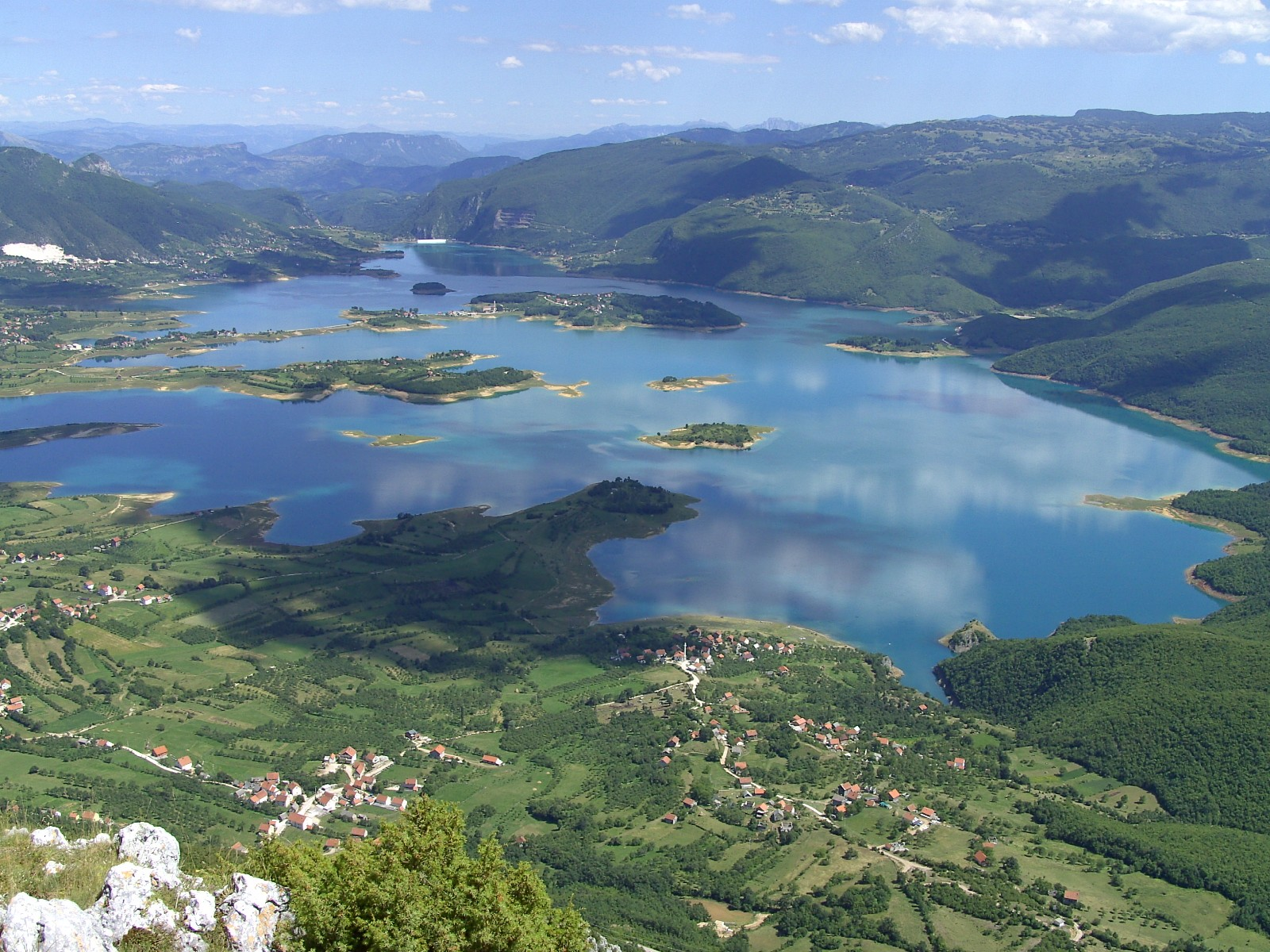
Ramsko Lake

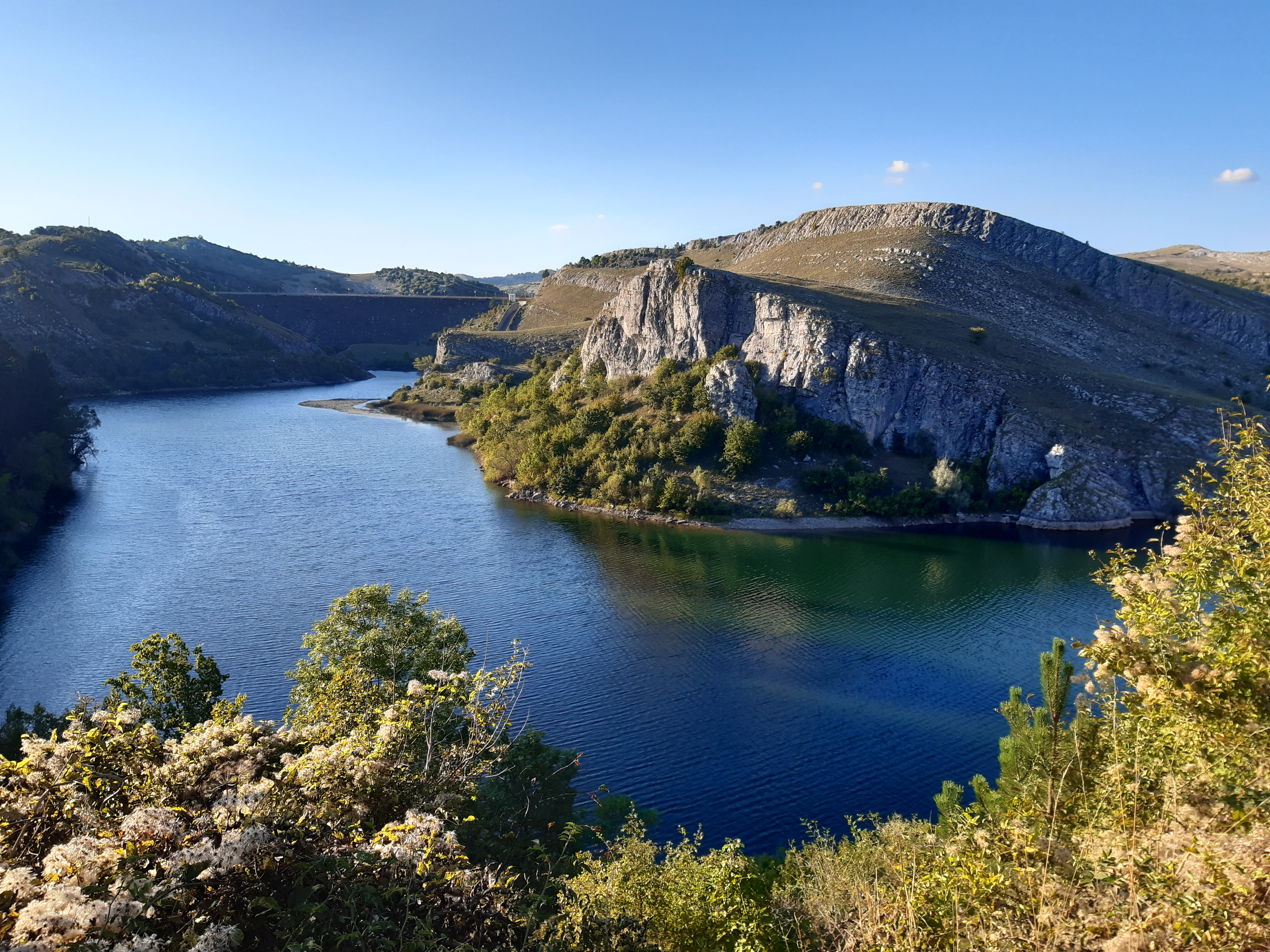
Klinje Lake

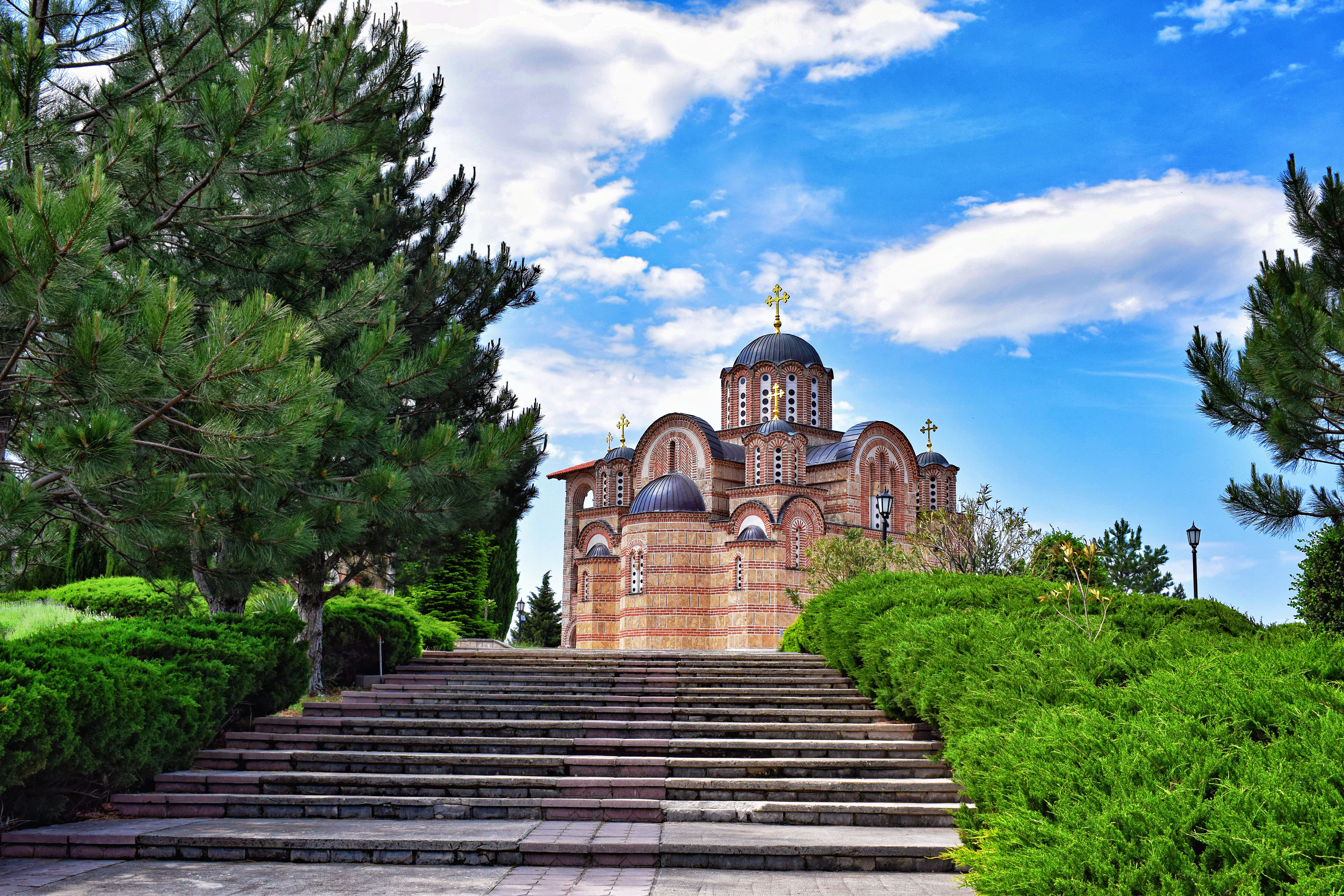
Hercegovačka Gračanica Monastery

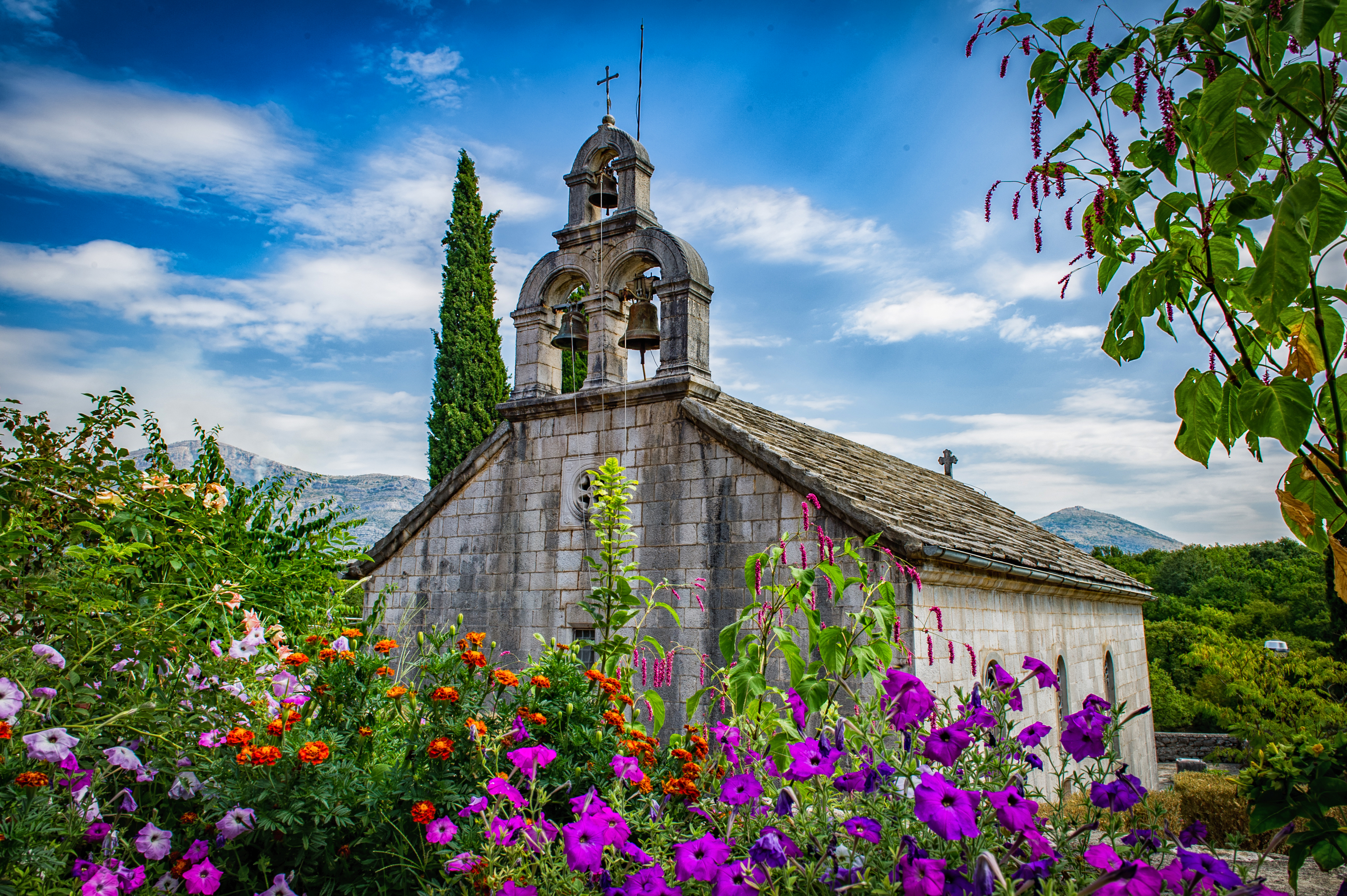
Duži Monastery

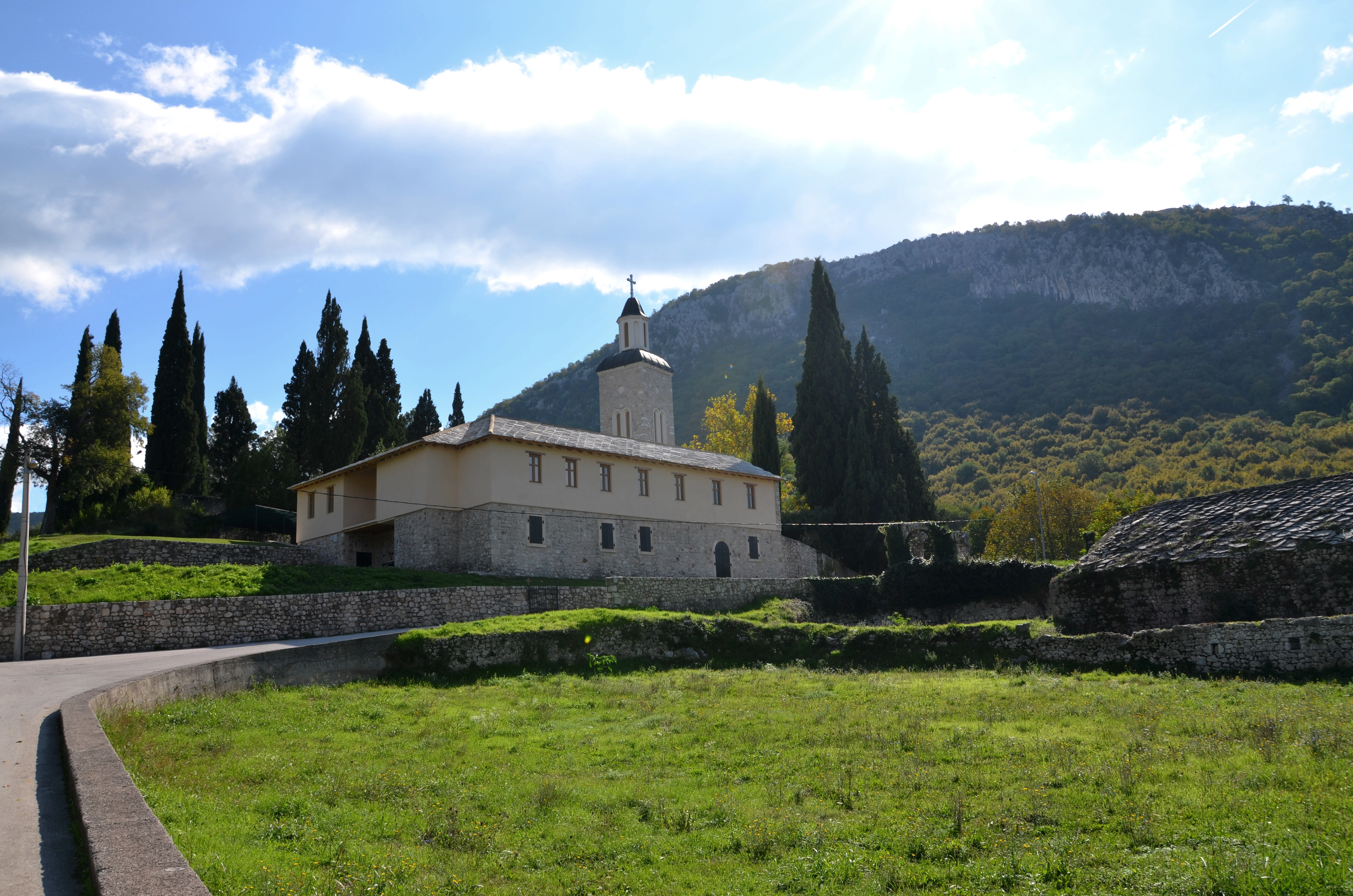
Žitomislić Monastery

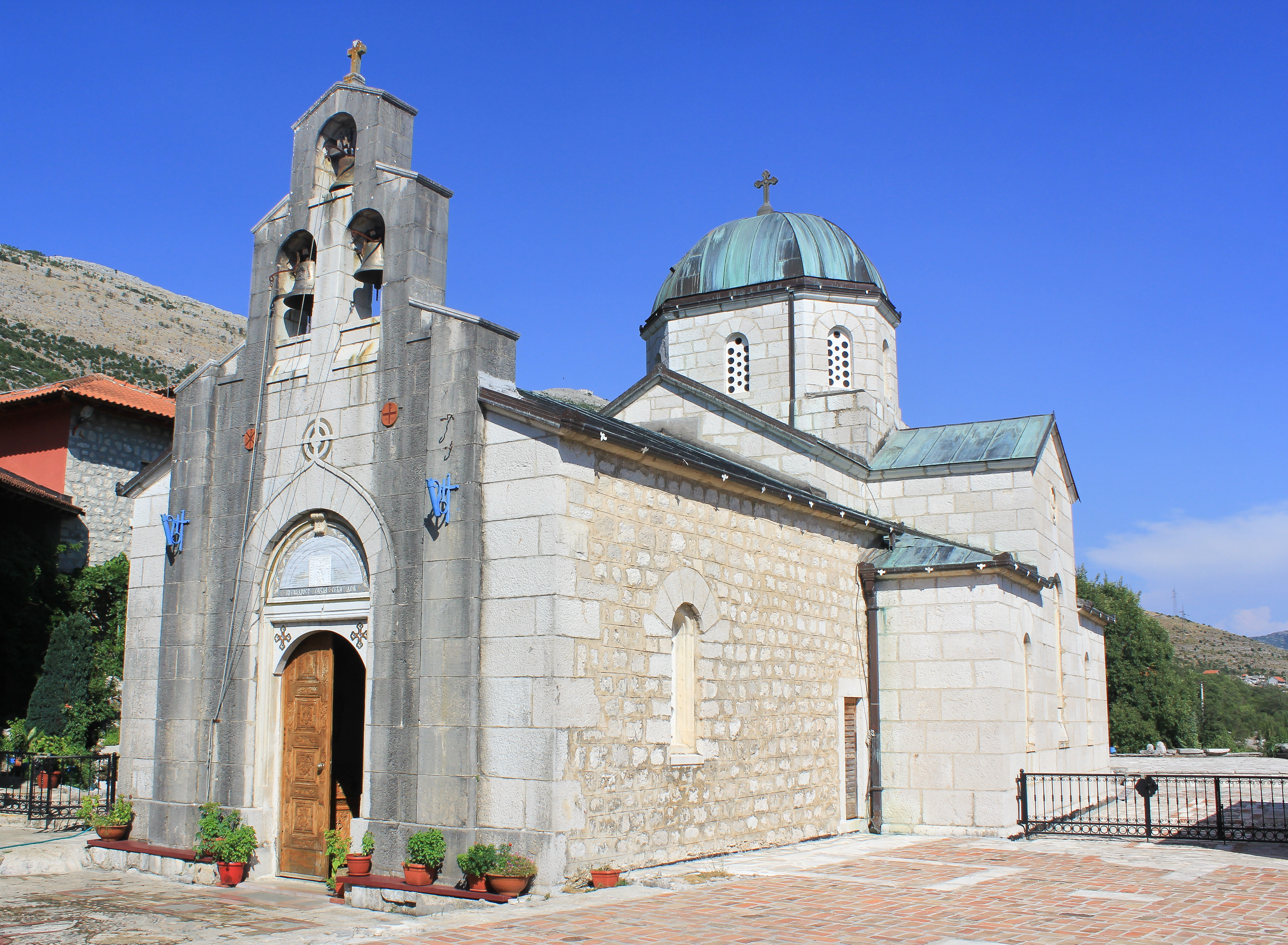
Tvrdoš Monastery

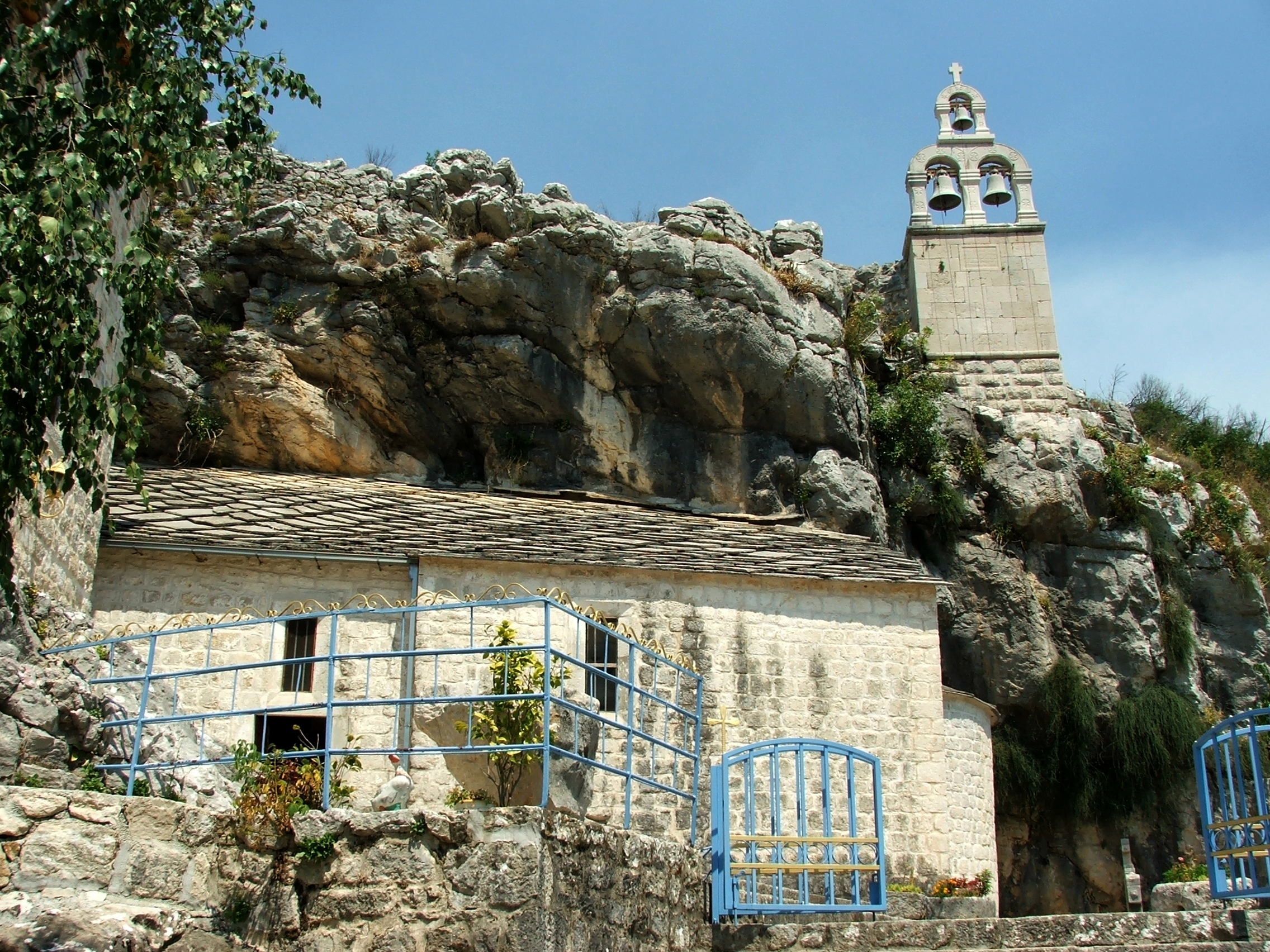
Zavala Monastery

== Bibliography ==
- Bataković, Dušan T. (1996). The Serbs of Bosnia & Herzegovina: History and Politics. Paris: Dialogue. ISBN 9782911527104.
- Ćirković, Sima (1964a). Herceg Stefan Vukčić-Kosača i njegovo doba (in Serbian). Naučno delo SANU.
- Ćirković, Sima (1964). Istorija srednjovekovne bosanske države (in Serbian). Serbian Literary Guild.
- Ćirković, Sima (2004). The Serbs. Malden: Blackwell Publishing. ISBN 9781405142915.
- Curta, Florin (2006). Southeastern Europe in the Middle Ages, 500–1250. Cambridge: Cambridge University Press.
- Fajfrić, Željko (2000), "3. Stjepan II Kotromanić (1314-1353)", Kotromanići, Janus
- Fine, John Van Antwerp Jr. (1991) [1983]. The Early Medieval Balkans: A Critical Survey from the Sixth to the Late Twelfth Century. Ann Arbor, Michigan: University of Michigan Press. ISBN 0472081497.
- Fine, John Van Antwerp Jr. (1994) [1987]. The Late Medieval Balkans: A Critical Survey from the Late Twelfth Century to the Ottoman Conquest. Ann Arbor, Michigan: University of Michigan Press. ISBN 0472082604.
- Karbić, Damir (2004). "Šubići Bribirski do gubitka nasljedne banske časti (1322.)" [The Šubići of Bribir until the Loss of the Hereditary Position of the Croatian Ban (1322)]. Historical Contributions (in Croatian). 22. Zagreb, Croatia: Croatian Academy of Sciences and Arts: 1–26.
- Klaić, Nada (1989). Srednjovjekovna Bosna: Politički položaj bosanskih vladara do Tvrtkove krunidbe (1377. g.) (in Croatian). Zagreb: Grafički zavod Hrvatske. ISBN 9788639901042.
- Krekić, Bariša (1978). "Contributions of Foreigners to Dubrovnik's Economic Growth in the Late Middle Ages". Viator. 9: 385–404. doi:10.1525/9780520327320-019. ISBN 9780520327320.
- Kurtović, Esad (2009). Veliki vojvoda bosanski Sandalj Hranić Kosača. Vol. 4 (Historijske monografije ed.). Institut za istoriju Sarajevo. ISBN 9789958649011.
- Lampe, John R. (2000). Yugoslavia as History: Twice There Was a Country. Cambridge, England: Cambridge University Press. ISBN 978-0-521-77401-7.
- Vego, Marko (1982). Postanak srednjovjekovne bosanske države (in Croatian). Svjetlost.
