= Sanković noble family =

14th and 15th century Bosnian noble family

Sanković
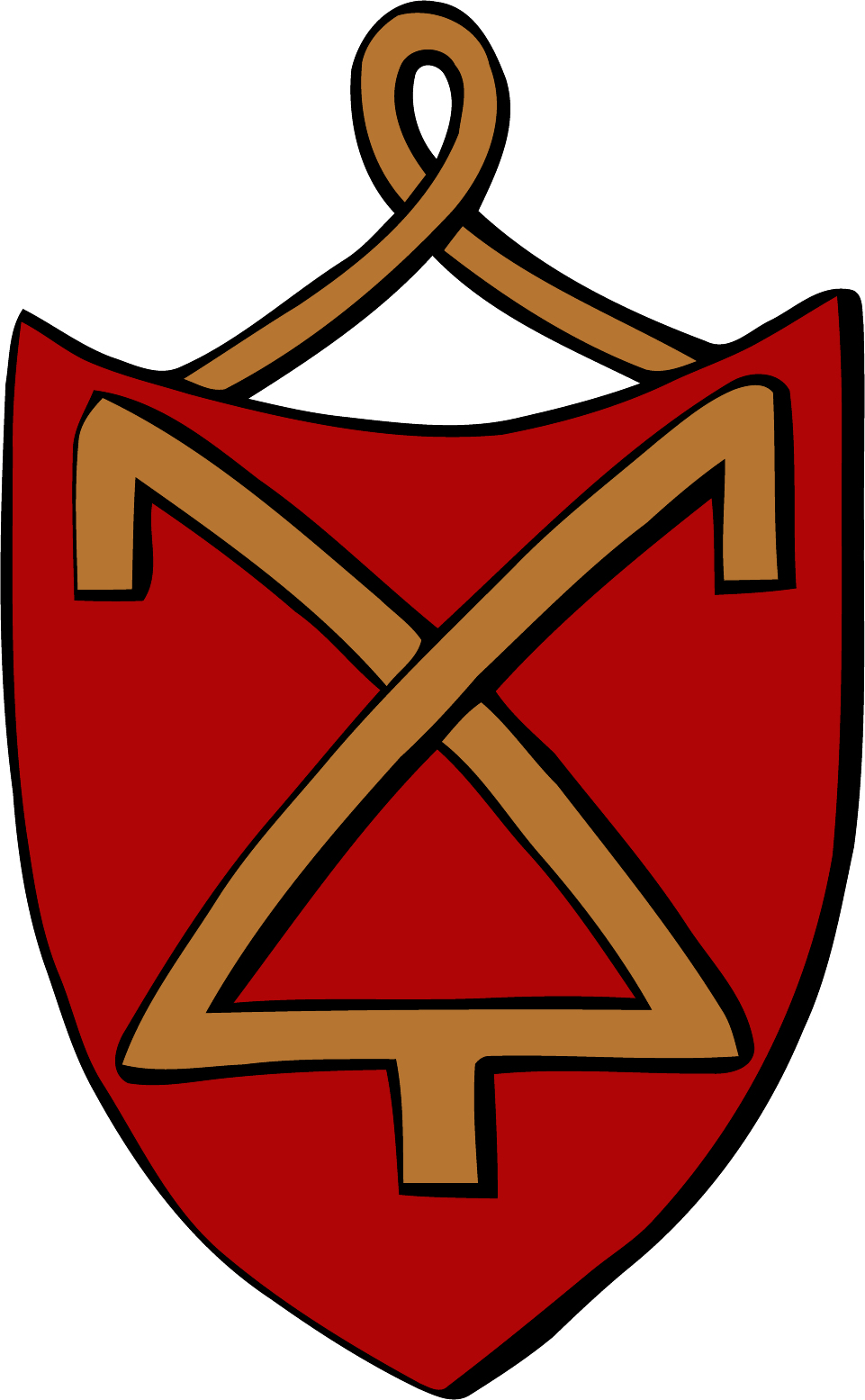
- Country: Vassalage to Serbian Empire (1368–1370); Vassalage to Banate of Bosnia (1326–35, 1348–77); Vassalage to Kingdom of Bosnia (1377–1404)
- Founded: fl. 1306
- Founder: Dražen Bogopenec
- Final ruler: Radič Sanković
- Titles: vojvoda; knez; judge
- Estates: Glavatičevo (seat); Nevesinje; Popovo Polje; Konavle
- Dissolution: 1404

The Sanković family was a powerful Bosnian noble family active in the 14th and start of the 15th century in Hum, serving the Serbian and Bosnian monarchies. Their seat was in Glavatičevo, where the family burial place is also located (hamlet Biskupi), and their estates included Nevesinje and Popovo Polje in what is today Herzegovina and Konavle in southern Dalmatia.

== Early history ==
The earliest known ancestor of the Bosnian noble family, Sankovićs, was Dražen Bogopenec, who was first mentioned in 1306. He was from Nevesinje, and was mentioned as having led raids into Hum, stealing from Ragusan subjects. Nevesinje was at the time part of the Kingdom of Serbia. According to Fine, in 1326, the Draživojević (the next generation of Bogopenec), along with other nobility, were sent by Bosnian Ban Stephen II into Hum to oust the Branivojević family, which served Serbia, to annex most of Hum. Finally Hum fell to Bosnia after the War of Hum (1326–29). Milten Draživojević, the first notable representative of the family, was mentioned in 1332.

== History ==
Sanko, the son of župan Milten, was first mentioned in 1335 and on 22 October 1348, the Republic of Ragusa granted citizenship to Sanko as an aristocrat of the Bosnian Ban. From 11 August 1366 on, Sanko was mentioned as a judge. He left the ranks of Ban Tvrtko I and joined Serbian magnate Nikola Altomanović for a brief period. When Altomanović campaigned against Ragusa in 1370, Sanko is said to have led the Bosnian army that aided Ragusa, and died in battle. He had four sons and a daughter: Beljak, Radič, Budelja, Sančin and Dragana. His sons knez Beljak, primarily, and vojvoda Radič Sanković, inherited his holdings.

Immediately after Tvrtko I's death in 1391, Beljak and Radič decided to sell the family estate of Konavle to Ragusa. A stanak, however, was convoked as a result by the nobility who objected the sale. Vlatko Vuković and Pavle Radenović revolted against Radič in December 1391 after receiving the stanak's blessings. They captured Konavle and occupied it, dividing it up for themselves, despite protests from Ragusa. When Vuković died, his nephew, Sandalj Hranić, succeeded him, continually struggling against Radič after being released in late 1398. In 1399, Radič became a member of the Great Council of the Republic of Ragusa. Radič participated in the Bosnian–Ragusan War in 1403–04, leading the attacks on Ragusa in the name of Bosnian king Stjepan Ostoja. However, Hranić sent Sanković back to prison in 1404, blinding him and taking his estates. Sanković died while in prison that same year, marking the end of the Sanković family.

== Members ==
- Dražen Bogopenec
  - Milten Draživojević, župan (count)
    - Sanko Miltenović
      - Beljak Sanković
      - Radič Sanković
      - Budelja Sanković
      - Sančin Sanković
      - Dragana Sanković
    - Gradoje Miltenović
    - Radača Miltenović

== See also ==
- Hercegovina

== Sources ==
- Fine, John Van Antwerp Jr. (1994). The Late Medieval Balkans: A Critical Survey from the Late Twelfth Century to the Ottoman Conquest. University of Michigan Press.
- Kurtović, Esad (2009). Veliki vojvoda bosanski Sandalj Hranić Kosača (PDF) (in Bosnian) (Historijske monografije; knj. 4 ed.). Institut za istoriju Sarajevo. ISBN 978-9958-649-01-1. Archived from the original (PDF) on 5 March 2016.
- Aleksa Ivić; Dušan Mrđenović; Dušan Spasić; Aleksandar Palavestra (1987). Rodoslovne tablice i grbovi srpskih dinastija i vlastele. Nova knj. ISBN 978-86-7335-050-9. "Sankovići"
- Fajfrić, Željko (2000), "3. Stjepan II Kotromanić (1314-1353)", Kotromanići, Janus
- Rudić, Srđan (2006). Властела Илирског грбовника. Београд: Историјски институт САНУ. ISBN 9788677430559.
