= Dražen Bogopenec =

15th century nobleman in Hum

County lord (župan) in Zagorje
- Predecessor: ?
- Successor: Milten Draživojević
- Born: Mid 13th century Nevesinje
- Died: after 1307
- Buried: Glavatičevo
- Noble family: Bogopanković (Sanković)
- Issue: Milten Draživojević
- Occupation: Brigand, nobility

Dražen Bogopenec (Serbian Cyrillic: Дражен Богопенец; fl. 1306–1307) was a county lord (župan) in Zagorje, a region in Kalinovik (between Kalinovik, Konjic and Nevesinje), in Hum (today part of Herzegovina). Zagorje was part of eastern Hum, which at the time was a province of the Serbian Kingdom under Stephen Uroš II Milutin, while western Hum had been taken by Paul I Šubić of Bribir, the Ban of Croatia, amid the dynastic civil war between Stephen Uroš II Milutin and Stephen Dragutin of Syrmia.

He was born in Nevesinje, in the middle of the 13th century. Bogopenec was a member of the prominent Bogopanković family, of which history little is known about. He and his associate župan Poznan Purćić plundered in Hum; Bogopenec is mentioned for the first time in Ragusan documents, in the Diversa Cancellarie from the year 1306; (dated to 20 or 24 May) when Ragusan nobleman Toma Držić (Thomadus de Dersa) complained to the Republic about the plundering and hijacking of a cargo filled with textile goods from Večerić, worth 800 perpers, in which Bogopenec participated in. Later, on 7 January 1307, a Đurko gave his testimony to the Ragusan knez and judges that he had been in Broćna, in Hum, when Nikifor Ranjina sued Bogopenec, Purćić and Aljen Bogavčić, and their associates, in front of knez Konstantin. The charged party returned some of the goods, and the rest they took from their properties and people. Bogopenec, Purćić and Bogavčić were the most powerful nobility of Hum in the beginning of the 14th century. Bogopenec' family gained a wider region in the 1330s, after the removal of Purćić.

Bogopenec was the founder of the House of Sanković and was the father of župan Milten Draživojević, who was in the service of Stephen II, Ban of Bosnia.

Political offices
Vacant Last known title holder: Radoslav as [Serbian] Lord of Hum	Lord of Zagorje (Eastern Hum) fl. 1306	Succeeded by Milten Draživojević

== Annotations ==
1. Bogopanković family: The Bogopanković family included Vidomir, Hlapec, his son Branislav, but it is not known which exact tie they had with Dražen Bogopenec. Their prominence is evident in their inclusion in the Armorial of Petar Ohmućević. The name is also rendered as Bogopanec, which was registered as late as 1388, showing that the name was strongly bonded in the tradition of the family.
