= Milten Draživojević =

14th century Bosnian nobleman

- župan (county lord)
- Born: before 1332
- Died: after 1343
- Family: Bogopanković (Sanković)

Milten Draživojević (Serbian Cyrillic: Милтен Драживојевић; fl. 1332–43) was a Bosnian župan (county lord) in the land of Hum, who is mentioned as serving the Banate of Bosnia between 1332 and 1335 and thereafter the Kingdom of Serbia. He was known for robbing the Republic of Ragusa.

Milten was the son of Dražen Bogopenec (fl. 1306), known from sources as a robber. The family (later known as Bogopanković) was prominent in the early 14th century, although information is scarce. Milten is mentioned for the first time in 1332, as a follower of Bosnian Ban Stephen II. Hum was a border province between Serbia and Bosnia, and became part of Bosnia in the 1320s.

In May 1335, Milten and his relative Vidomir looted Ragusan Manuçe de Mençi in Onogošt (Nikšić). On 24 May 1335, Milten and his son Sanko "from Zagorje" (de Sacorie) are mentioned as Bosnian subjects. The next year, on 5 July 1336, vojvoda Ružir and župan Milten are mentioned as Serbian subjects. In autumn that year, King Stefan Dušan advocated reconciliation between Serbian feudals and the Republic of Ragusa, in which these two restless feudals are prominent.

His son Sanko, a Bosnian magnate, is the eponymous founder of the Sanković family.

== Annotations ==
1. The surname is rendered in Latin documents as Drasenouich, Drasiuoeuich, Drasoeuich, Draseouich, Drasinoevich. Mavro Orbini calls him Mladien, while Lukarević calls him Milutin. In Old Slavic Cyrillic, his name was spelt Militen (Милитен).

== Sources ==
Books

- Stojanović, Ljubomir (1929). Старе српске повеље и писма. Vol. 1. Beograd–Sremski Karlovci.

Journals

- Mijušković, Jovanka (1960). "Хумска властеоска породица Санковићи". Историјски часопис. 11. Belgrade: Istorijski institut, SANU: 17–54.
- Smiljanić, Aranđel (2013). "Жупани у дипломатији" (PDF). Гласник. V (5). Banja Luka: Удружење архивских радника Републике Српске: 91–108.
