= Rakitno field =

Coordinates: 43°32′24″N 17°26′30″E

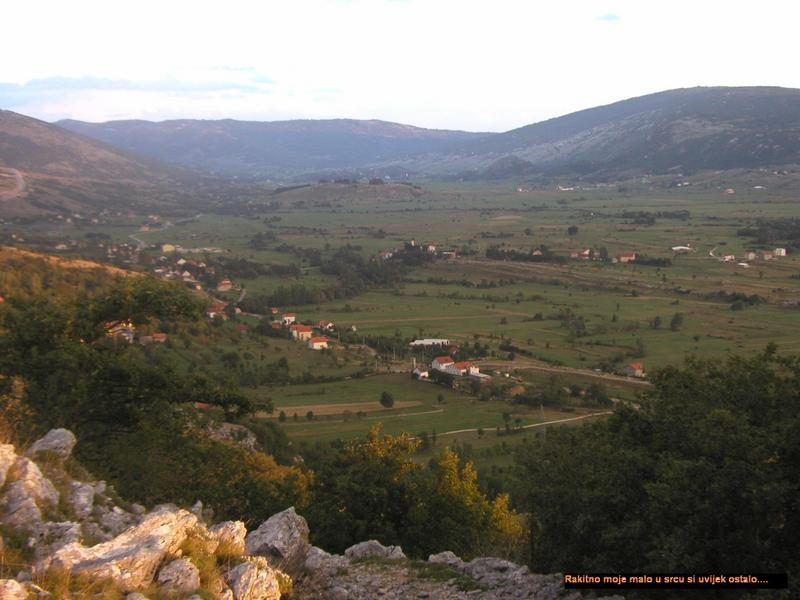
Rakitno hamlet at elevation of 887 metres.

Rakitno Field is a karst plateau and geographical region about 70 km2 in Bosnia and Herzegovina in an area of Široki Brijeg, West Herzegovina Canton.

== Geography ==
Rakitno, along with Posuško and Virsko polje, Tribistovo and the mountainous area around Blidinje Lake, is one of the four plateaus of the Posuško area. Around the center of the municipality, there are at the crossroads of important communications: Mostar - Imotski - Split, Mostar - Tomislavgrad - Livno, and Ploče - Ljubuški - Grude - Rama - Gornji Vakuf - Travnik. The valley between Poklečani, Vrpolje and Sutina is rich in water, and three rivers flow into it: Jelica, Zmijevac and Ugrovača.

To the northwest is the larger Duvanjsko field, to the west is the Posuško field with Posušje, and to the east is the Čabulja mountain. It stretches in a northwest-southeast direction. It is 8.5 km long and three kilometers wide with an area of 15 km2. The tributary of the Lištica Ugrovača flows through the field, which occasionally floods it. The altitude of the field is about 900 meters above sea level.

== See also ==
- List of karst plateaus in Bosnia and Herzegovina
- Posušje
- Poklečani
- Sutina
- Vrpolje
