= Drežnica =

Drežnica may refer to:

== Bosnia and Herzegovina ==
- Drežnica Valley, a karstic gorge surrounding the river Drežanka
  - Drežanka (river) (sometimes Drežnica), a right tributary of the Neretva
- Donja Drežnica, a village near Mostar
- Gornja Drežnica, a village near Mostar

== Other countries ==
- Drežnica, Croatia, a village near Ogulin
- Drežnica, Bujanovac, a village near Bujanovac, Serbia
  - Drežnica oil shale deposit
- Drežnica, Kobarid, a village near Kobarid, Slovenia
