= Mastan Bubanjić =

Medieval Bosnian nobleman

Gospodin Mastan Bubanjić
- Vojvoda
- Reign: second half of the 14th c.
- Successor: Radislav
- Born: before 1356
- Died: after 8 October 1382
- Noble family: Bubanjić-Masnović noble family
- Issue: Radislav and Miroslav Masnović
- Memorials: 43.521405306811566°N 17.73749813236478°E Inscription of Mastan Bubanjić near family's court.

Mastan Bubanjić was a member of the medieval Bosnian noble family of Masnović. As a prominent member of a state noble family, rusag's nobility (Serbo-Croatian: rusaška gospoda), he bore the title of duke (vojvoda), and had a seat in Drežnica. His legacy includes a rock-inscription on the rock-face in Donja Drežnica, between Jablanica and Mostar, present-day Bosnia and Herzegovina. The inscription was declared a National Monument of Bosnia and Herzegovina by KONS in 2006.

== History ==
The Drežnica valley of the river Drežanka, a tributary of the Neretva, is 21 km long, and it cut between Čabulja in the south and Čvrsnica in the north. It is densely populated in a series of hamlets, which are generally called Donja and Gornja Drežnica.

The area around the river Drežanka belonged to the early medieval župa of Večenika – Večerić, which bordered the župas of Rama and Duvno. With the disintegration of the župa of Večenika, Broćno was first formed, and then Blato. The rest of the territory was still called Večenike (Večenike), although other administrative units were separated from it until the beginning of the 15th century, namely, Planina, Polje and Drežnica. Although small in terms of the number of inhabitants and the area it occupies, Drežnica had a certain administrative-political autarchy, precisely because of its geographical isolation.

Since 1325, the area has been part of the Bosnian Banate, which was ruled by the Kotromanić family. From 1357, together with western Hum, the area came under the Hungarian king Louis I control as a dowry of his wife Elizabeta, daughter of Stjepan II Kotromanić. After the death of King Louis, the entire area returned to the medieval Bosnian state, where it remained until 1463.

Court of Mesnovići noble family was in Donja Drežnica. Duke Mastan Bubanjić and his descendants were prominent members of the family. Legacy of Mastan Bubanjić is his inscription, which can roughly be dated between 1356 and 1366.

In addition to the contents of the inscription, which mentions duke Mastan and his two sons Radoslav and Miroslav, other two reliable written sources about them and the family exist. The first is the document from the Dubrovnik archive on the town's council decisions, in which, on 28 May 1381, admitted Mastan's son, Knez Radoslav, as well as his sons and cousins, into the ranks of Dubrovnik citizens. Another source, dated 8 October 1382, is the decision made by the Dubrovnik council, which allowed Radoslav Mesnović to deposit grain and honey in the city.

== Inscription of the Duke Mastan Bubanjić ==
The inscription of Mastan Bubanjić is found in the rock in Donja Drežnica, in the locality called Toplo. It was declared a National Monument of Bosnia and Herzegovina by KONS, and with its surroundings forms a cultural landscape.

The cultural landscape area includes a leveled area next to a high rock with an inscription, the remains of a medieval settlement on a slope toward the Drežanka river left bank, traces in rock where houses were and walls next to the rocks; also, a thick layer of medieval ceramics is found, with a lot of fragments of the same type were found on the slope towards the Neretva bank. The houses were probably wooden, with one side leaning against the rocks, where natural cuts were used to the greatest extent. The inscription is carved in Bosnian Cyrillic on an almost vertical surface of the rock on an area of 110 x 75 cm, raised about 2 m from the ground.

Transcription in Bosnian using Latin script:

Va ime oca i s(i)na i s(ve)tago duha. Ase dvor' voevode M(a)sna i negoviju s(i)nu Radosl(a)va i Mirosl(a)va. Se pisa rab' b(o)ži i svetago D(i)mitrija u dni g(ospo)d(i)na krala ugarskoga Loiša i g(ospo)d(i)na bana bosan'skoga Tvr'tka. Tko bi to potr'l' da e proklet' oc(e)m' i s(i)nom' i s(ve)tim' d(u)hom'.

Translation in English:

In the name of the father and the son and the holy spirit. Here is the court of duke Mastan and his sons Radoslav and Miroslav. This was written by the servant of God and Saint Demetrius in the days of Lord King Lois of Hungary and Lord Ban Tvrtko of Bosnia. Whoever would wipe it away, may he be cursed by the father and the son and the holy spirit.

== Literatura ==
- Pavao Anđelić, Srednjovjekovna župa Večenike-Večerić, Glasnik Zemaljskog muzeja u Sarajevu, arheologija, Sarajevo, 1976, 259 -279.
