= Drežnica Valley =

- Drežanka Canyon
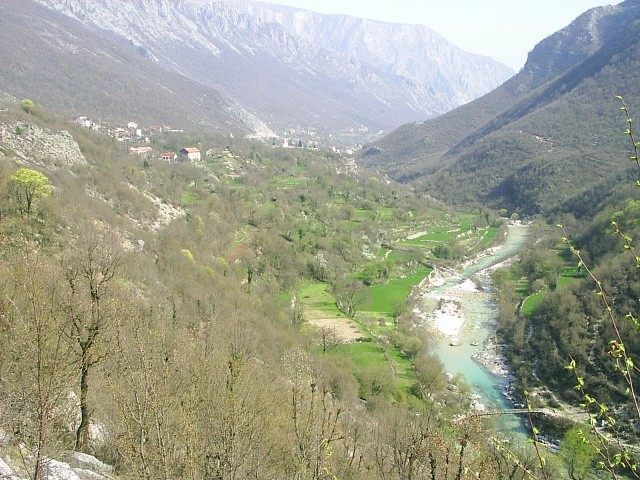
- Drežanka in the middle course
- Interactive map of Drežnica Valley
- Location: Bosnia and Herzegovina
- Nearest city: Jablanica
- Coordinates: 43.529117974437845°N 17.644849961724667°E
- Length: 29 km (18 mi)
- Area: 146 km^{2} (56 sq mi)
- Designation

KONS of Bosnia and Herzegovina
- Official name: Cultural landscape with inscription of the Mastan Bubanjić in Donja Drežnica
- Type: Category II cultural and historical property
- Criteria: A, B, C iv.v., G i.ii., H i.
- Designated: 17 May 2006 (?th session)
- Reference no.: 2815
- Decision no.: 05.1-2-309/05-6
- State: National Monuments of Bosnia and Herzegovina

Drežnica Valley or Drežanka Canyon is a valley surrounding a mountain stream Drežanka, which cuts through a deep 29 kilometers long karstic gorge between mountains Čvrsnica and Čabulja, part of the Dinaric Alps range. The stream is right tributary of the Neretva, and a valley follows the west-east axes. The main settlements are Gornja Drežnica and Donja Drežnica with their numerous hamlets, and are part of the territory of the city of Mostar, in Bosnia and Herzegovina.

== History ==
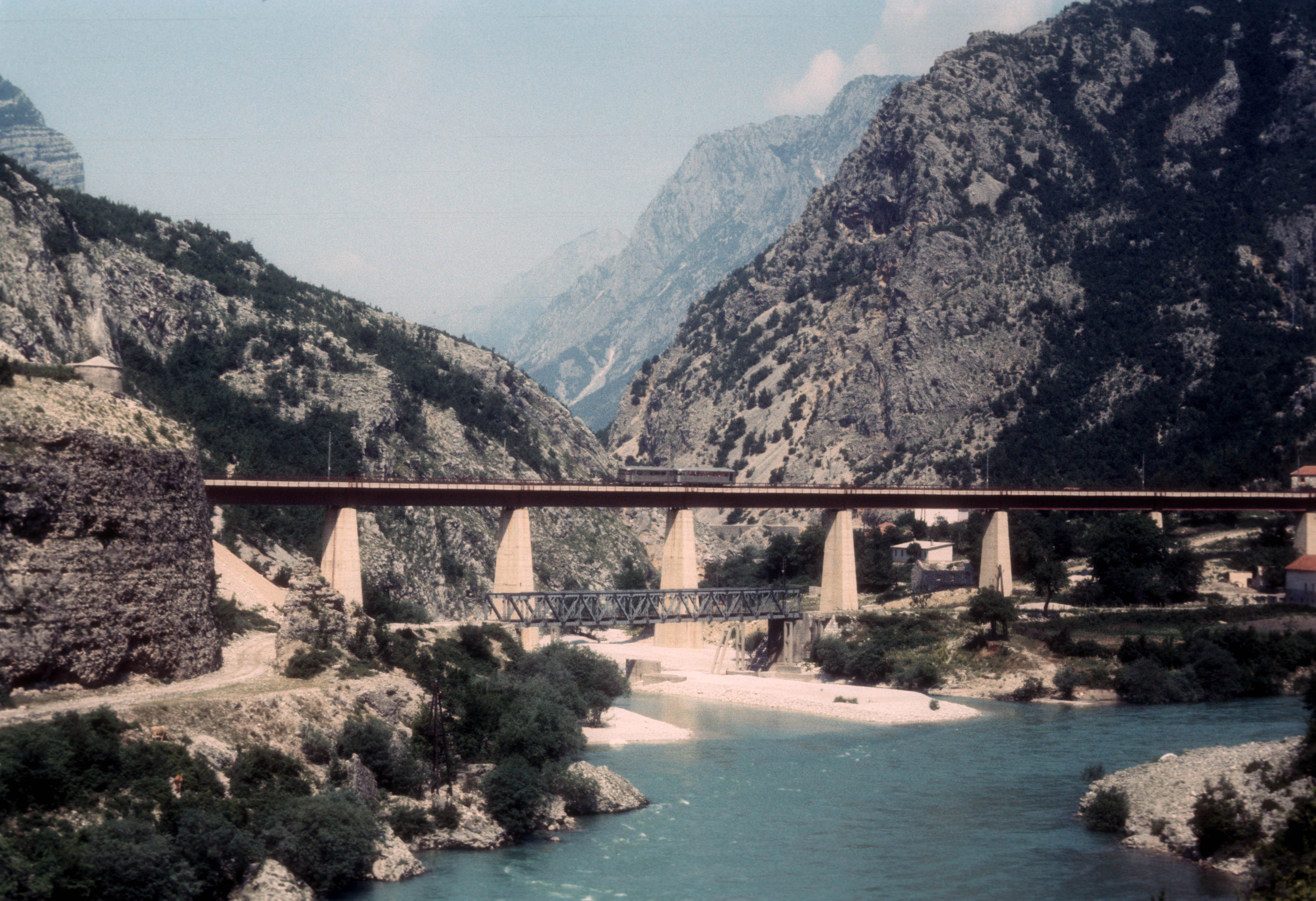
Drežanka estuary, before the construction of HPP Salakovac and a flooding with a Salakovac reservoir

=== Cultural landscape and the inscription of Mastan Bubanjić ===
The landscape of Drežanka Valley has a historical and cultural significance for country's heritage.

At the site reserved as a climbing area, known as the Kuk Cyclamen sector, there is an epigraphic monument - a medieval inscription of duke Mastan Bubanjić carved into the rock. This inscription roughly dates from the 14th century.

The landscape of Drežanka Valley, including the inscription of Mastan Bubanjić, is inscribed into the List of National Monuments of Bosnia and Herzegovina by KONS.

== Geography and geomorphology ==
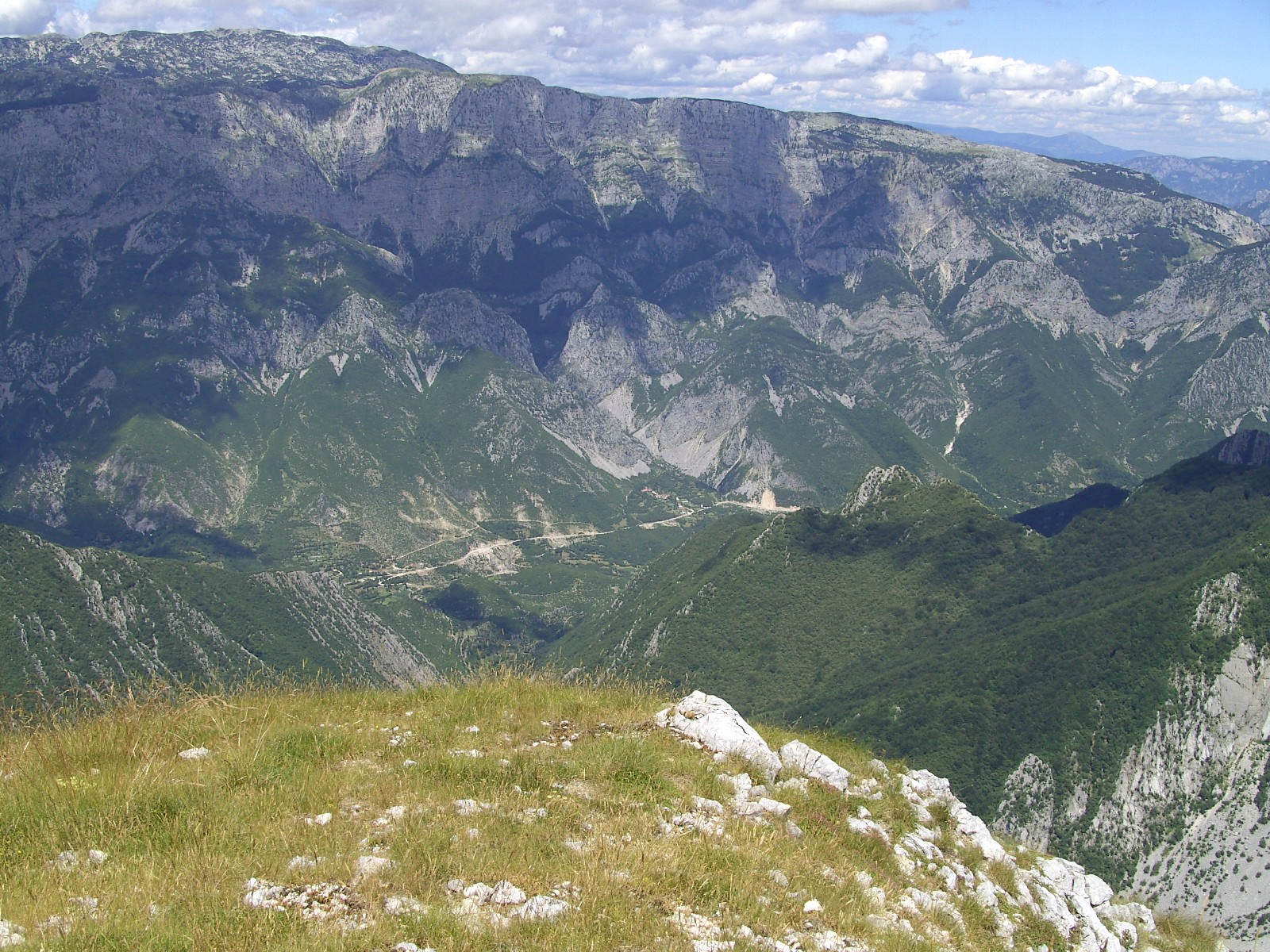
View on Čvrsnica from Čabulja, across the Drežanka valley

=== Hydrology ===
Drežanka springs at the foot of one of Bosnia and Herzegovina's largest mountain, Čvrsnica from strong karst spring called Mošćenica or Mošćenuša at an altitude of 485 m, and in its headwaters creates three waterfalls with a height of 10 to 12 meters.

=== Gorge ===
Drežanka Canyon or Canyon of Drežnica is 21 km long, and the catchment area is 146 km^{2}. The catchment area and the course of Drežanka are situated between Čvrsnica (2226 m) in the north and Čabulja (1776 m) in the south. The Drežanka valley stretches in the west–east direction. It flows into the Neretva in the immediate vicinity of Drežnica at an altitude of 112 m. The average drop of Drežanka is 17 ‰. With all its visible layers of rock, both at the bottom and at the top and above it, the Drežanka canyon is a considered by researchers an open-air paleontological museum, where it is possible to find fossils from the geological past spanning as much as 200 million years, from the Triassic, Jurassic, Cretaceous up to the upper Eocene. It undoubtedly represents one of the deepest real canyons in Europe and the world.

=== Movran waterfall ===
Somewhere halfway between Donja and Gornja Drežnica is the place where the Movran (also known as Veliki Movran) waterfall intermittently appears. The waterfall falls from the cliffs of Čvrsnica into the valley of Drežanka. The water appears occasionally, during heavy and prolonged rainfall, or snow melting season during spring. According to some data, the waterfall is 584 meters high, while according to others, its height is 385 meters. This makes it the highest waterfall in Bosnia and Herzegovina. Besides the main column of water, there are also smaller cascades and bends called Movrančići.

Movran is not a permanent waterfall. It is actually a cavity (siphon) in the mountain depths where water collects throughout the year, so that during heavy rains or snow melting season, when it is completely filled, it empties as a waterfall.

== Tourism ==
=== Alpinism and rock climbing ===
For more than 20 years, the Drežanka canyon has been an alpinist's climbing area and has more than 100 routes that are distributed in ten sectors of different orientations, which means that certain sectors are suitable for climbing at different times of the day. Drežnica rock of top quality provides climbing routes for both beginners and experienced climbers. Ratings are in the difficulty range from 4 to 8.

=== Hiking ===
The Drežanka source is about eight kilometers away from closest settlement and is a popular hiking trail approximately two-hour walk in length. Not far from the spring there are three waterfalls with a height of 10 to 12 meters.

=== Diving and river beaches ===
The favorite bathing place is called Stupina in Draga and until recently jumps were held there as a preparatory competition for jumps from the Old Bridge in Mostar. Crna Stupina in Striževo is also a favorite swimming spot.

== Blidinje Nature Park ==
Drežnica Valley is part of a protected area designated as the Blidinje Nature Park.

== Also see ==
- Diva Grabovica Valley
