= Movran =

Waterfall in Gornja Drežnica, Bosnia and Herzegovina

- Veliki Movran; Great Movran
- Location within Bosnia and Herzegovina
- Location: Gornja Drežnica
- Coordinates: 43°33′30″N 17°33′14″E
- Type: horsetail-plunge-punchbowl
- Total height: 584 m (1,916 ft)
- Number of drops: 1
- Average width: ≈3 m (9.8 ft)
- Watercourse: siphon

Veliki Movran (transl. Great Movran) or simply Movran, is a waterfall in Bosnia and Herzegovina. The waterfall falls from the cliffs of Čvrsnica into the Drežnica Valley, through which runs a small mountain river of Drežanka, a right tributary of the Neretva. It appears intermittently, in the late winter and during spring in the season of snow melting, or during heavy and prolonged rainfall, usually in late autumn, winter and early spring.

== Geography and hydrology ==
Veliki Movran is a waterfall on the southern slopes of Čvrsnica, between the settlements of Gornja Drežnica and Donja Drežnica, small settlements about 30 kilometers north of Mostar, Bosnia and Herzegovina. The settlements are located in the Drežnica Valley, between two large mountains, Čabulja and Čvrsnica, surrounding a small river, the right tributary of the Neretva, the Drežanka.

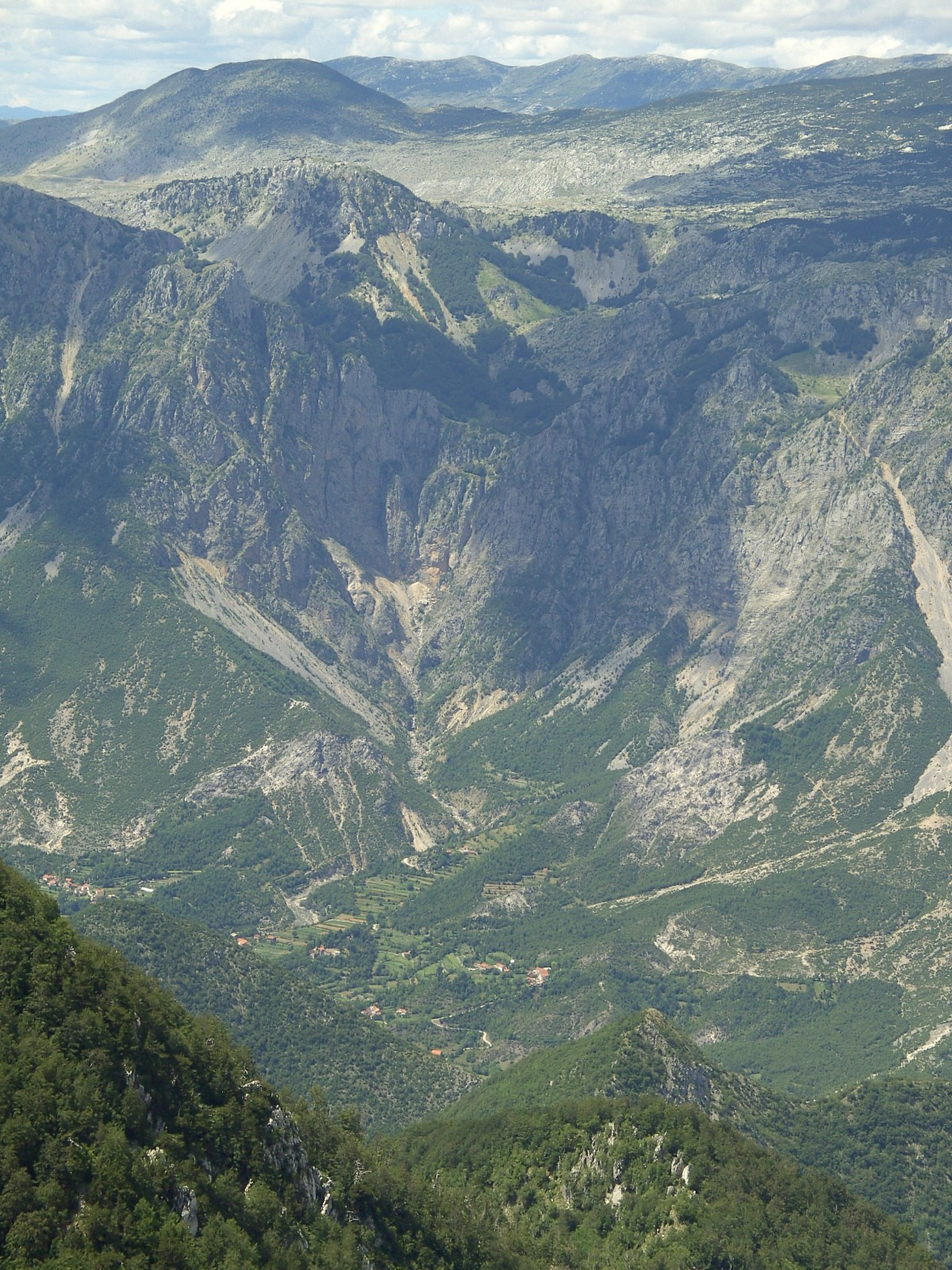
View of Čvrsnica across the Drežanka canyon from Čabulja.

It is certainly the highest waterfall in Bosnia and Herzegovina, and among the highest in Europe. According to one set of data, it is 584 meters high, its starting point is 1,383 meters above sea level, and the final point is 799 meters above sea level. Other sources state that the waterfall is 395 meters high, but it all depends on the method of measurement and the category in which this natural attraction is classified.

Movran is not a permanent waterfall. It appears seasonally once or twice a year, and disappears very quickly, after a day or two. It is a huge siphon in which water collects all year round, only to explode and empty itself during the heaviest rains, when the mountain siphon is completely filled.

In addition to the main column of water, there are also smaller cascades and bends called Movrančići. One such fall is quite large and it is named Mali Movran (Little Movran).

== See also ==
- Skakavac (Sarajevo)
- Skakavac Waterfall (Perućica)
