= North Herzegovina =

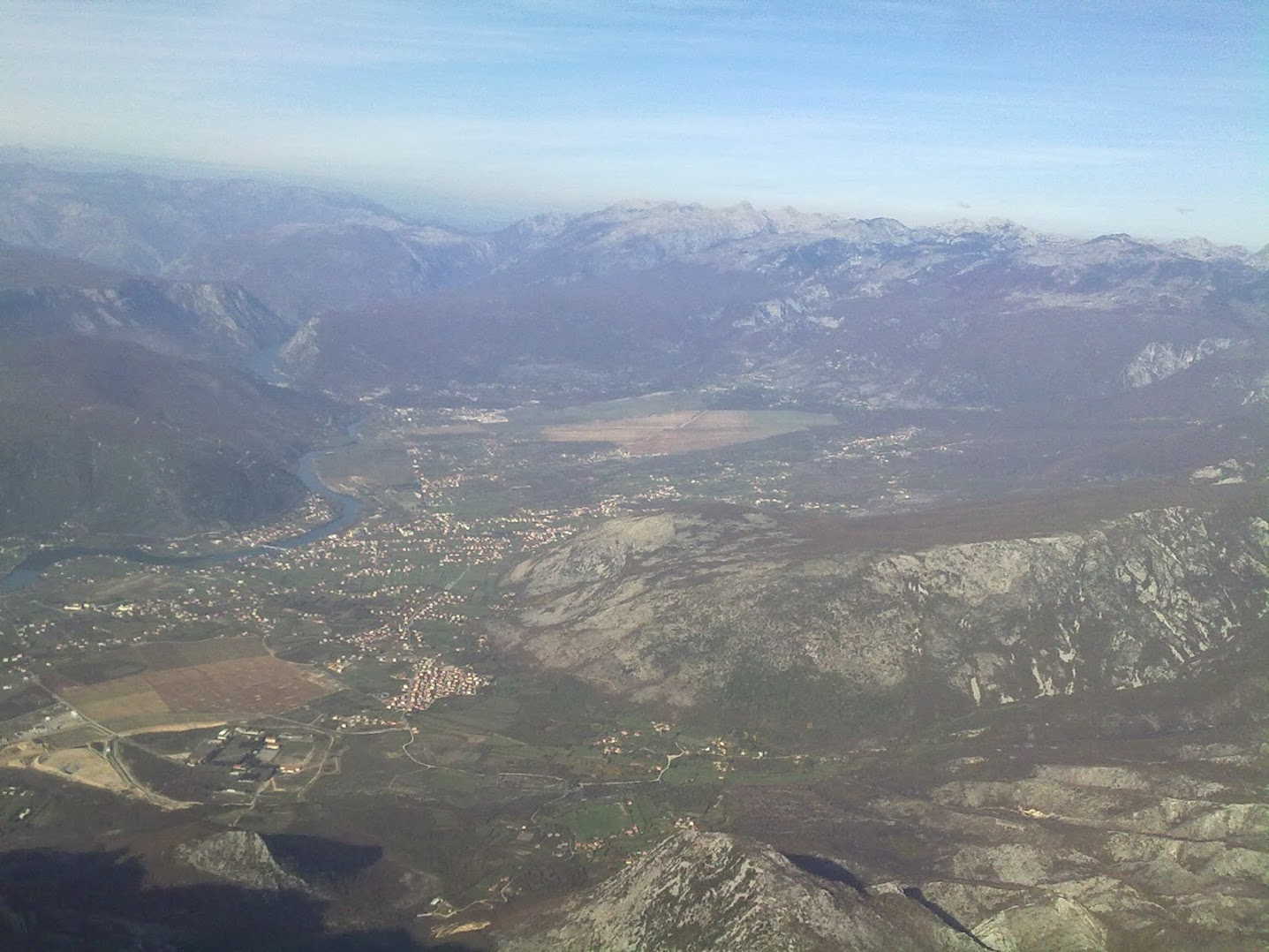
View from Velež mountain following the Neretva valley, upstream and northward looking at the central areal of High Herzegovina mountains, Čabulja, Čvrsnica, Prenj (Mostar just beyond the image's lower left corner).

North Herzegovina, also called High Herzegovinian, is a region of Herzegovina surrounding the Upper Neretva. It includes municipalities Jablanica, Konjic in Herzegovina-Neretva Canton, and in Republika Srpska, Ulog, Kalinovik, parts of Nevesinje and Gacko. It encompassing High Herzegovinian mountain region of the Dinaric Alps, with mountains Vran, Čabulja, Čvrsnica, Prenj, Raduša, Bitovnja, Bjelašnica, Visočica, Crvanj, Treskavica, Lelija, Zelengora, Maglić, Volujak, and high plateau of Blidinje, and micro-regions like Morine and Rudine above Gacko. and Glavatičevo on the Neretva.

The climate of North Herzegovina is different from the other parts of Herzegovina. The biggest town of North Herzegovina is Konjic, also known as the biggest municipality in Bosnia and Herzegovina.

North Herzegovina is known for high mountains, clear rivers, artificial reservoirs and natural mountain lakes. The longest river is Neretva and largest lake is artificial reservoir of Jablanica lake (Jablaničko jezero), while largest natural lakes are Boračko Lake and Uloško Lake. Other mountain lakes are scatered across the mountains, with Zelegora alone having nine.

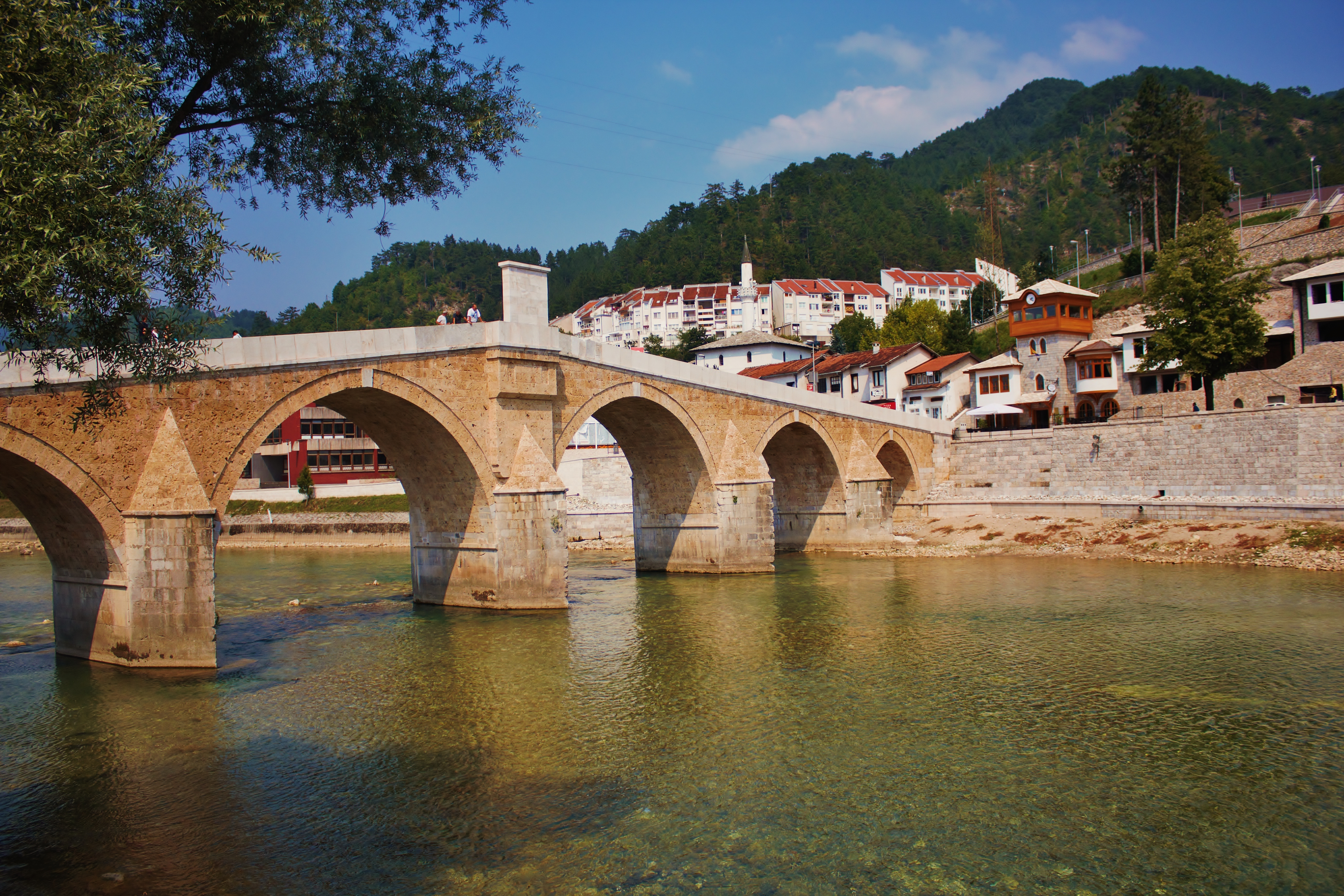
Konjic bridge
