= Blidinje plateau =

Tourism in Bosnia and Herzegovina

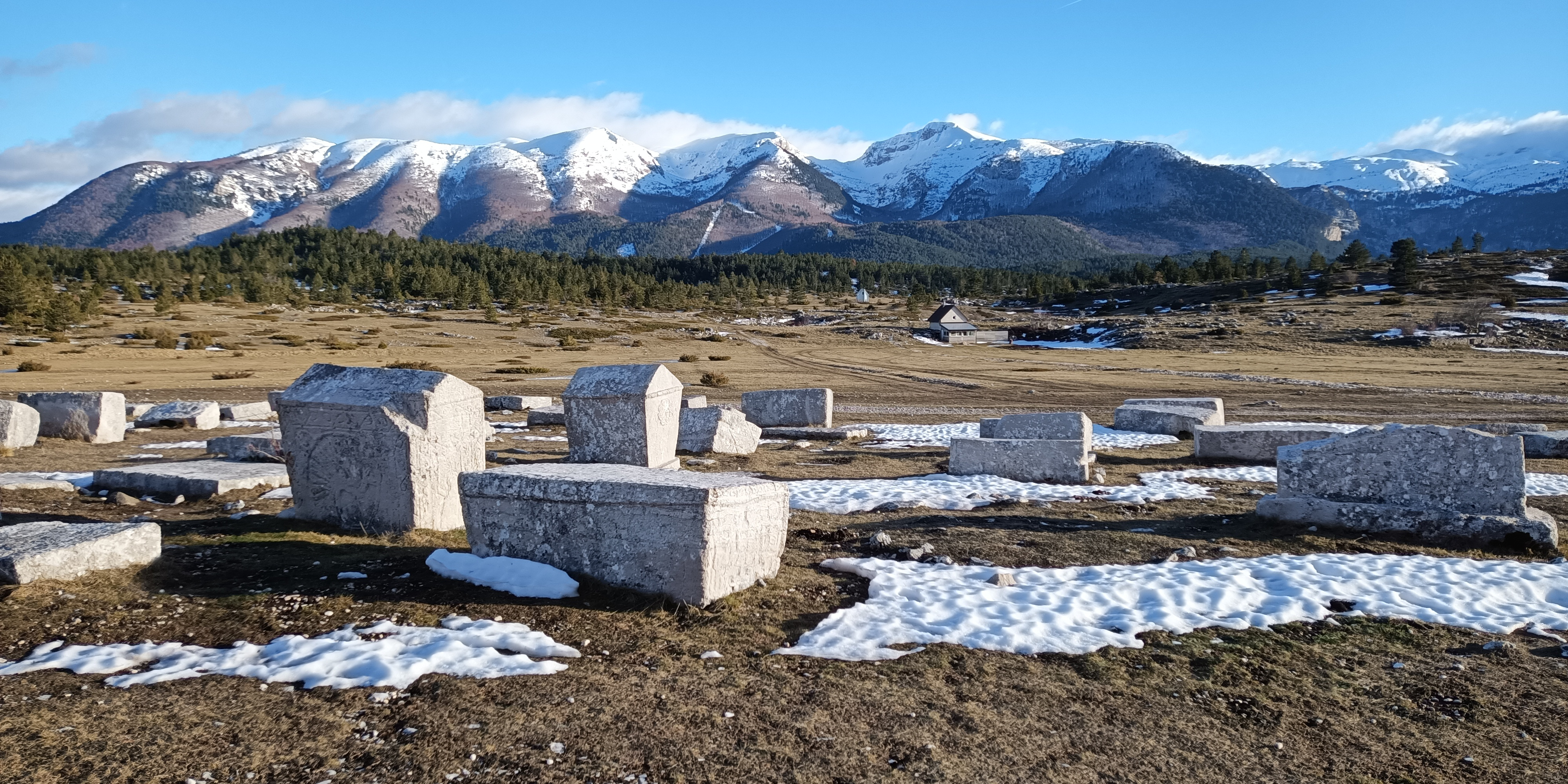

Highest point
- Elevation: 1,150–2,228 m (3,773–7,310 ft)
- Coordinates: 43.62°N 17.61°E

Dimensions
- Length: 22 km (14 mi) South-North
- Width: 17 km (11 mi) East-West
- Area: 513.45 km^{2} (198.24 sq mi)

Naming
- Nickname: Bosnianherzegovinian Tibet

Geography
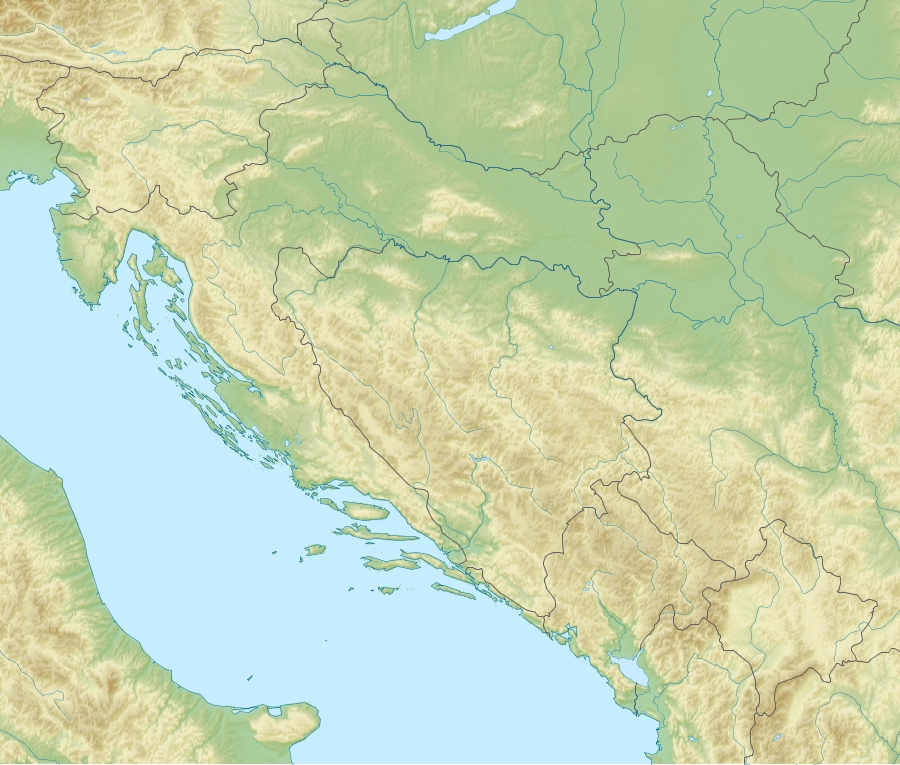
- Location within Bosnia and Herzegovina Location within Dinaric Alps
- State: Bosnia and Herzegovina
- Region: Herzegovina
- Canton: Herzegovina Neretva; West Herzegovina
- Municipality: Jablanica; Posušje; Tomislavgrad; Prozor-Rama; Mostar
- Town: Jablanica; Posušje
- Parent range: Dinaric Alps

Geology
- Formed by: Thrust faulting
- Orogeny: Alpine orogeny
- Rock age: Late Mesozoic-Cenozoic (Paleogene)
- Mountain type: sedimentation of limestone deposit
- Rock type: carbonate limestone

Blidinje plateau (Croatian: Blidinjska visoravan) is a karst plateau in Bosnia and Herzegovina, situated at the heart of Dinaric Alps, between major mountains of the range, Čvrsnica, Čabulja and Vran, with characteristic karstic features such as Dugo Polje field, Blidinje Lake, Grabovica and Drežnica valleys, and others. It represents important natural, hydrogeological reservation in karst of Bosnia and Herzegovina, with significant cultural and historical heritage, and Dinarides in general.

== Geography and hydrology ==
The melting glaciers from Čvrsnica during the two past ice ages created this open and barren valley. A spacious plateau, 15–25 km long, is situated at an elevation of 1.150-1.300 meters a.s.l., between Čvrsnica and Vran mountains with a total area of 513 km^{2}. Although geomorphologically one whole, plateau is divided in two geographically and topographic distinct features, first in lower southern part, areal around the lake Blidinje, and another in northern higher part of the plateau where a flat plain Dugopolje is situated, as well as administratively between four municipalities: Jablanica, Prozor-Rama, Posušje, Tomislavgrad, and Mostar. The closest town to the Blidinje Nature Park is Jablanica, which is 24.9 km away.

=== Doljani valley ===
Doljani valley is the longest valley and a northern border of the Čvrsnica-Vran-Čabulja complex, with the Doljanka river running through.

=== Dugo Polje ===
Going from the north and the Doljanka river, plateau opens with a flat plain of Dugo Polje at the higher end and lead toward south longitudinally between Vran at the north-northwestern side, with its highest peak on 2.074 meters a.s.l., and on the south-southeastern Čvrsnica mountain, with its highest peak Pločno at 2.228 meters a.s.l. On the opposite south-southeastern end of the plateau, beyond Blidinje lake, is Čabulja mountain with its highest peak at 1.786 meters a.s.l. further toward east beyond Čvrsnica is Grabovica valley that stretches all the way to the Neretva river and its canyon.

=== Grabovica valley ===
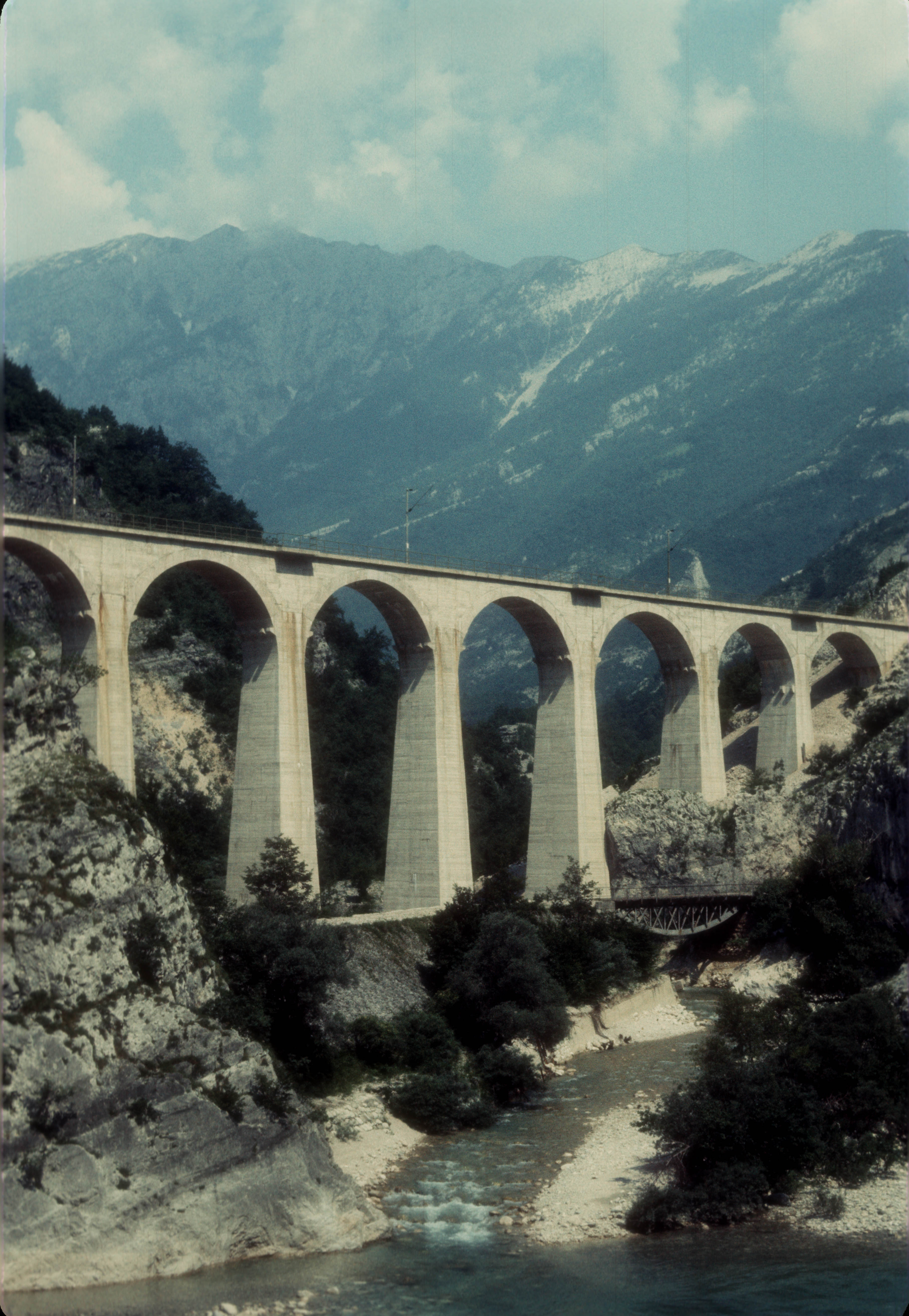
Railway bridge over the Grabovica fl. in the Neretva's middle section canyon, cca.1970, 10 yrs. prior formation of artificial lake

Grabovica valley with small Grabovica creek is a special reserve within park, squeezed deep into Čvrsnica, and form a deep canyon between steep and rugged cliffs of the mountain. Within the valley are two small villages Gornja Grabovica (Jablanica) and Donja Grabovica (Jablanica). The legend of Diva Grabovčeva tells the story about legendary daughter of a local shepherd who, as story goes, was killed by local nobleman whom she rejected, so that she would not marry another.

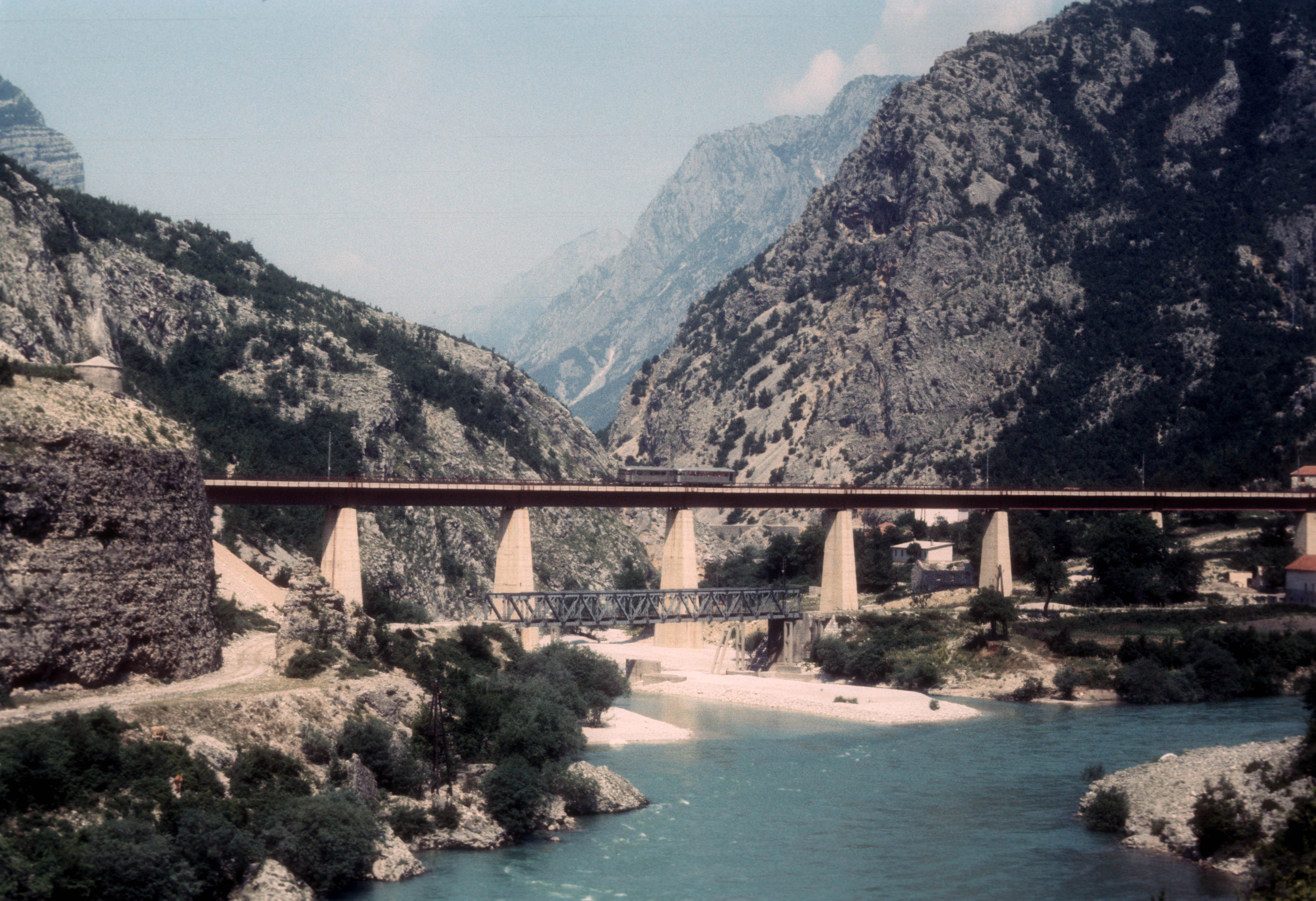
Railway bridge over the Drežanka fl. in the Neretva's middle section canyon, cca.1970, 10 yrs. prior formation of artificial lake

=== Drežnica valley ===
Further downstream much larger vale appears again, this time between Čvrsnica and Čabulja mountains, called Drežnica Valley. The stream of Drežanka runs between large and steep slopes of the valley, with two eponymous villages, Donja Drežnica (Lower Drežnica) and Gornja Drežnica (Upper Drežnica) being situated on its banks.

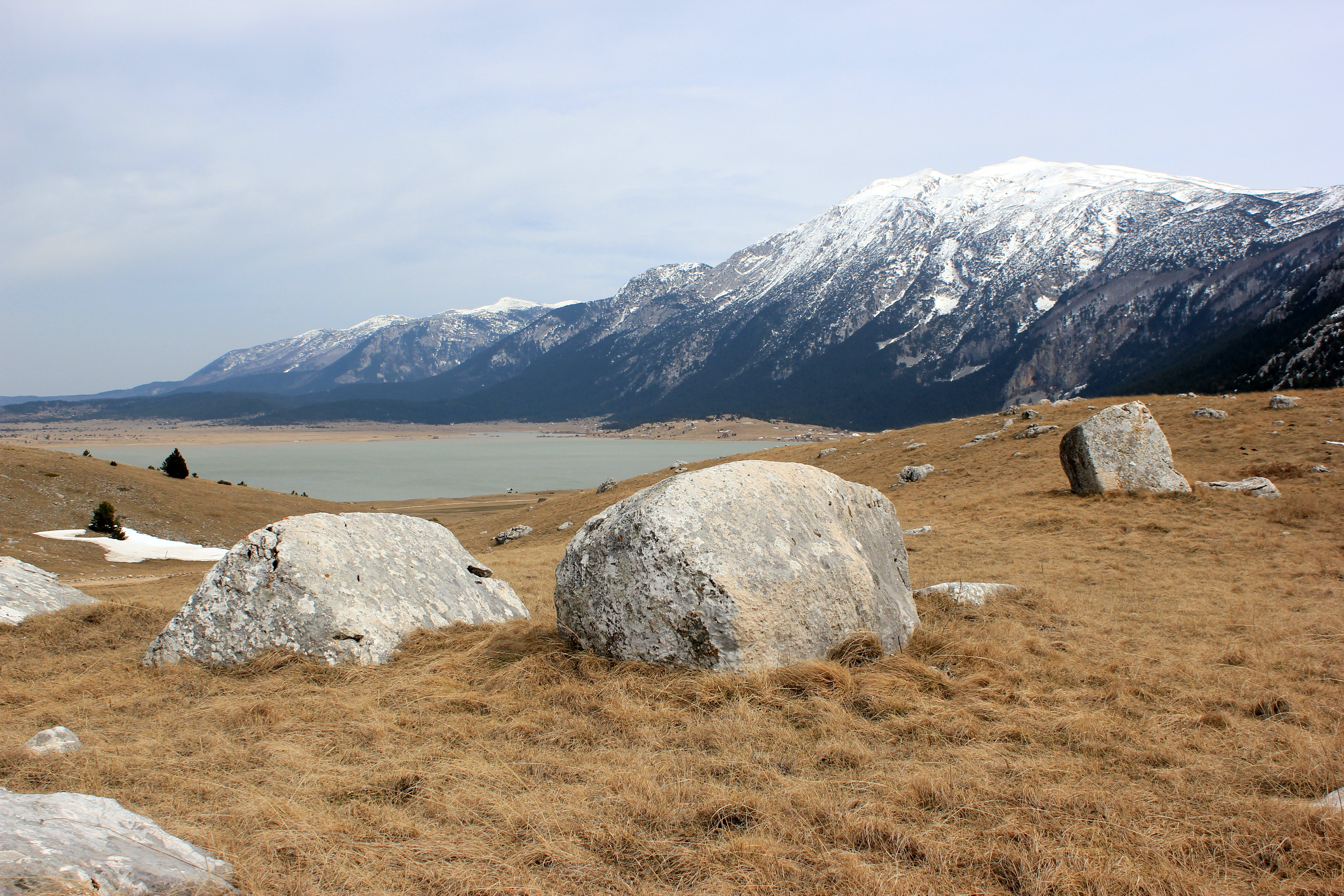
Blidinje Lake with stećak necropolis in the front and Čvrsnica slopes in the background.

=== Blidinje lake ===
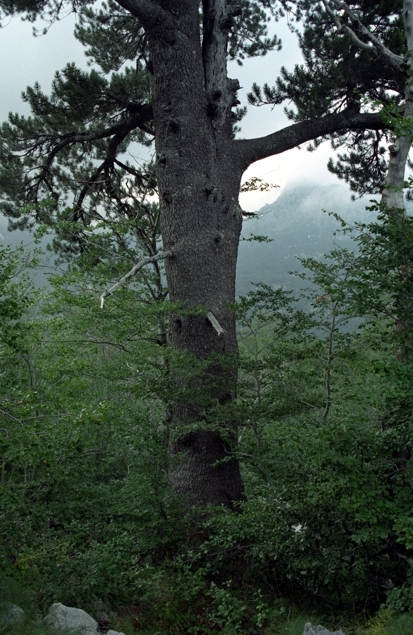
Pinus leucodermis

The most important hydrogeological phenomena in the park is alpine lake, Blidinje Lake, largest of its kind in Bosnia and Herzegovina.

Blidinje lake is the direct result of a glacial retreat, but according to the Poklečani Parishes office documents, lake is, also, a product of anthropogenic intervention and activities of human inhabitants. According to these documents, the lake is artificial and it was created at the end of the 19th century. In order to keep the water that is lost through the subterranean passage, local residents and cattle breeders sealed sinkholes with branches and clay, so that water could not find its way underground. Therefore, the lake was formed. Its surface area varies between 2,5 and 6 km^{2}, while its average depth is 1.9 m, with altitude of 1,184 m above sea level.

=== Other lakes and lokvas ===
Beside Blidinje, plateau hosts few other, smaller lakes and lokvas, such as Crepulja and Crvenjak. The Crvenjak Lake is a small glacial lake located in the Čvrsnica massive. The lake is oval-shaped, approximately 70 meters long and 50 meters wide. It has a depth of approximately 9 meters.

== Flora and fauna ==
Barren rocky slopes are interspersed with thick forests of pine, including the endemic white-bark pine at Masna Luka called Pinus heldreichii (Bosnian pine). Three types of wild thyme and dozens of wild flowers cover the valley and mountain sides in the spring and summer.

== History, heritage and culture ==
All around the valley is dotted with the Bosnia and Herzegovina trademark stećci from medieval ages. It is not clear how long human settlements have existed here but research began when Blidinje recently received Nature park status. Traces of Illyrian graves and Roman roads indicate that Blidinje has been settled for at least 2,500 years. The large necropolis at Dugo Polje indicates that the waves of Slavs that came in the 7th century also made this area their home.

=== Stećaks necropolis ===
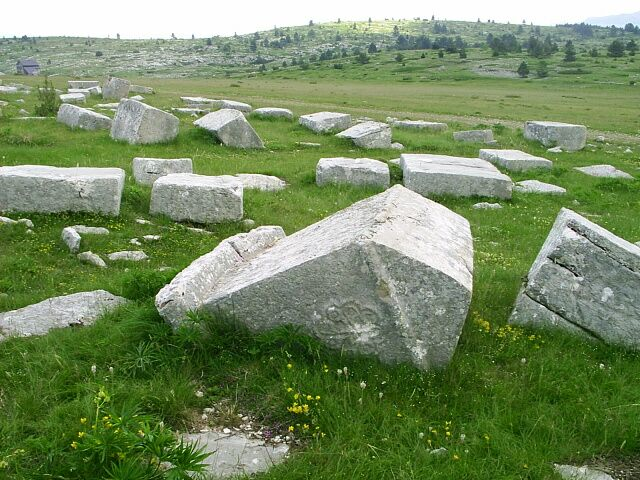
Dugo Polje stećak necropolis.

Ponor, Donje Bare, Jezero, Risovac, and Dugo Polje are five stećak medieval necropolises, named by their location. They are scattered throughout the Blidinje karst plateau, and the one at Dugo Polje polje is the largest. Necropolises are all protected by KONS, and one on Dugo Polje is given particular attention by being included into World Heritage by UNESCO.

The park itself is free of mines with well-marked trails.

=== Culture and traditional life style ===
There is also a Franciscan monastery that is located within the park and open to visitors. Houses here are traditional shepherd homes with straw roofs that are mainly used during the spring and summer seasons. Winter is harsh and cold in these parts.

==== Hajdučka Republika Mijata Tomića ====
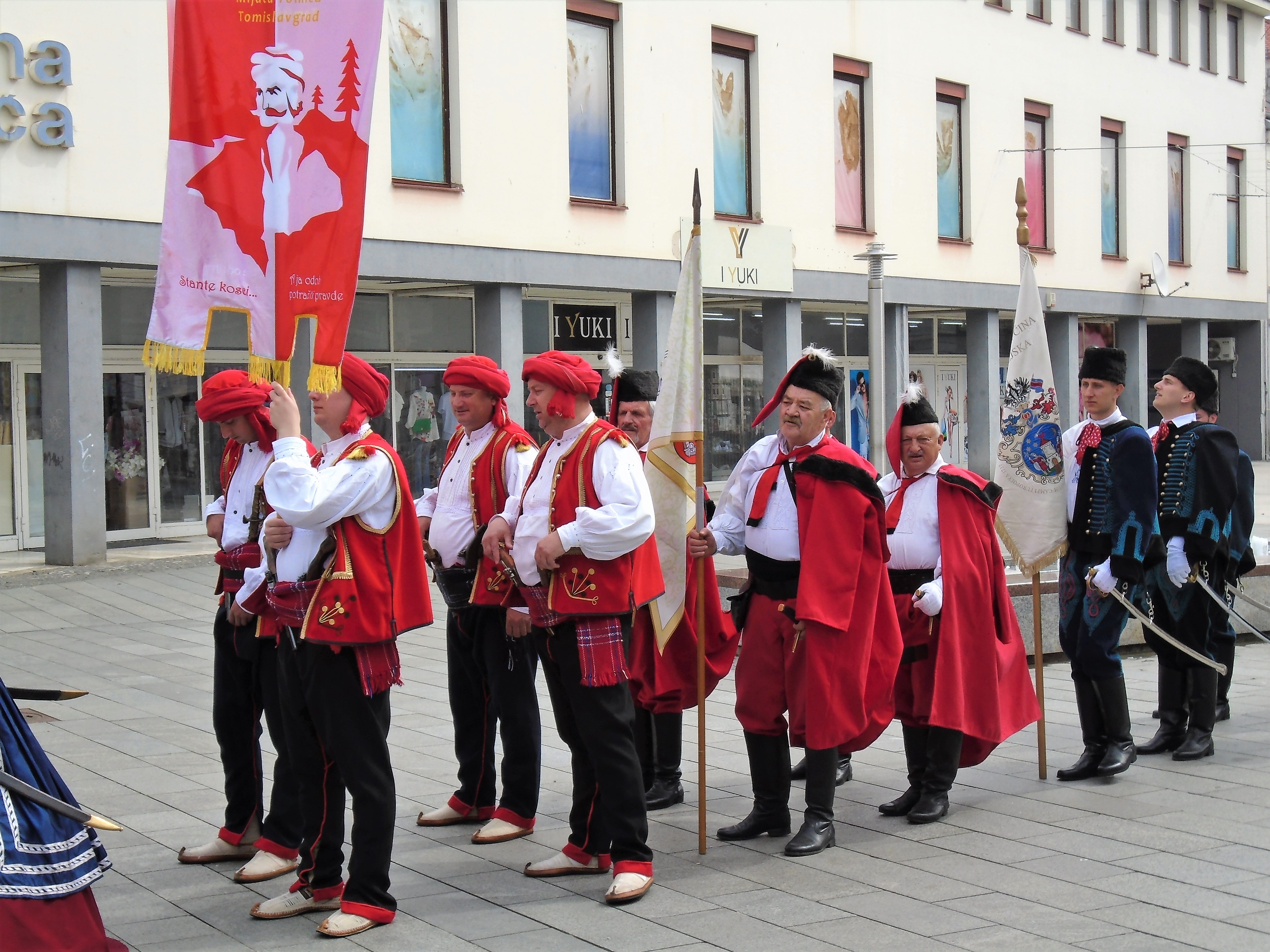
Four members (left side) of the "Mijat Tomić Hajduk Band", a military reenactment group from Tomislavgrad

Hajdučka Republika Mijata Tomića (lit. 'Hajduk [Rebel] Republic of Mijat Tomić') is a private property in the middle of Blidinje Nature Park. Property spreads over seven hectares (70,000 m^{2}; 17 acres) between the mountains of Vran and Čvrsnica and is a tourist destination as a fictional self-proclaimed micronation. It was born out of protest because of inefficiency of the state in solving a problem with the local electricity supply.

The satirical idea to proclaim a republic was conceived by the Vukoja-Lastvić family who built and owns a motel on the location (Hajdučke Vrleti), consisting of the late Vinko, a tourism entrepreneur and a humorist enthusiast, as head of the family; his wife Albina; and his daughter Marija – who is the current "President of the Republic" as of March 2019. The fictional republic was founded on the day of Diva Grabovčeva, 29 June in 2002, and is named after Mijat Tomić, who is unrelated to the owners' family, but was a historical person known as a hajduk (lit. 'rebel'), with his hiding place in the nearby caves.

When Vinko Vukoja wanted to solve a problem regarding the main power supply net, he encountered years of negligence by three bordering municipalities, Posušje, Tomislavgrad and Jablanica, who couldn't agree under which jurisdiction the area fell and shifted the responsibility to one another. For years, whenever the motel owner asked any of the municipalities to solve his electricity problem, they would reject him, saying it was not their problem, referring him to one of the other two. Finally, Vukoja solved that with his own money. On this alleged "no one's land", the Hajdučka Republika was proclaimed as a form of satirical defiance. On the day of the proclamation, SFOR was alarmed anonymously, but as soon as they realized the true nature of the idea, they left the very same day. The republic has no separatist ambitions.

Thanks to this satirical protest project, its motel became one of the most popular places in western Herzegovina. Every year, there is a celebration and amateur liars' contest (from which politicians are barred as professional liars), Triba slagat i ostat živ (lit. 'To lie and stay alive'). This project attracted the attention of Bosnian, Croatian and Serbian media, as well as some media outside the Balkans.

The republic has a consul and portparole, issuing its own passports; its purported currency is the "kubura" (lit. 'holster pistol'). The formation of political parties is strictly forbidden, as well as any dealing with politics, since "it is not good for human wellbeing". Its state flag has a white background, in the upper left corner is the state coat of arms, which is a chessboard, and in the middle is the picture of Mijat Tomić marked in blue. On 16 October 2009, President Vinko Vukoja died in a car accident. His daughter Marija inherited his position and the title "harambaša" (lit. 'chieftain'). The republic has its official webpage on the motel's website.

== Blidinje Nature Park ==
Blidinje Nature Park
- IUCN category III (natural monument or feature)
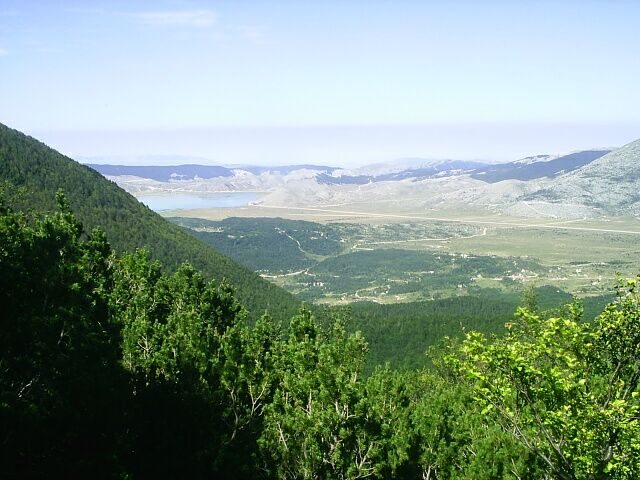
- Plateau and the lake
- Interactive map of Blidinje Nature Park
- Location: West Herzegovina Canton, Bosnia and Herzegovina
- Nearest city: Mostar
- Coordinates: 43.62°N 17.61°E
- Length: 3–5 km (1.9–3.1 mi)
- Area: 358.00 km^{2} (138.22 sq mi)
- Elevation: 1,150–1,300 m (3,770–4,270 ft)
- Established: 1995
- Named for: plateau
- Visitors: Open all year (in Open all year)
- Governing body: Federation of BiH
- Operator: Blidinje Nature Park Public Enterprise
- Website: Blidinje Nature Park

Blidinje Nature Park (Croatian: Park prirode Blidinje) is a nature park in Bosnia and Herzegovina, established on 30 April 1995. It is situated at the Blidinje plateau, and comprises the territory of the plateau including major mountains of the Dinaric range, Čvrsnica, Čabulja and Vran. Its main geological characteristic are karstic features such as Dugo Polje field, Blidinje Lake, Grabovica and Drežnica valleys, and others, with a total area of 364 km^{2}. It represents important geological and hydrogeological nature reserve in Dinaric karst of Bosnia and Herzegovina, with significant cultural and historical heritage.

=== Ski resort ===
The Risovac ski-resort is developed in the areal of Risovac village in the Jablanica municipality. In the last decade or so, after creation of a ski track on the slopes of Čvrsnica, a weekend village with cottages and several motels with various other complementary tourist facilities, such as ski-lift, has developed near the ski track.

== See also ==
- List of lakes in Bosnia and Herzegovina
- List of mountains in Bosnia and Herzegovina
- List of protected areas of Bosnia and Herzegovina
