= Drežanka (river) =

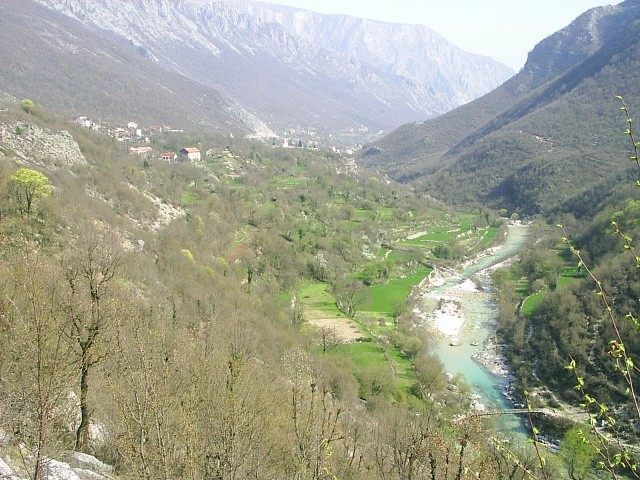
- Drežanka in the middle course

- Location within Bosnia and Herzegovina

Location
- Country: Bosnia and Herzegovina

Physical characteristics
- Source
  - location: Čvrsnica
  - elevation: 485 m
- Mouth
  - location: The Neretva river near village of Donja Drežnica
  - coordinates: 43.5189°N 17.7385°E
  - elevation: 112 m
- Length: 21 km (13 mi)
- Basin size: 146 km²

Basin features
- Progression: Neretva→ Adriatic Sea

Drežanka is a mountain stream and a right tributary of the Neretva. It flows through Drežnica Valley and the settlements of Gornja Drežnica and Donja Drežnica on the territory of the city of Mostar, in Bosnia and Herzegovina.

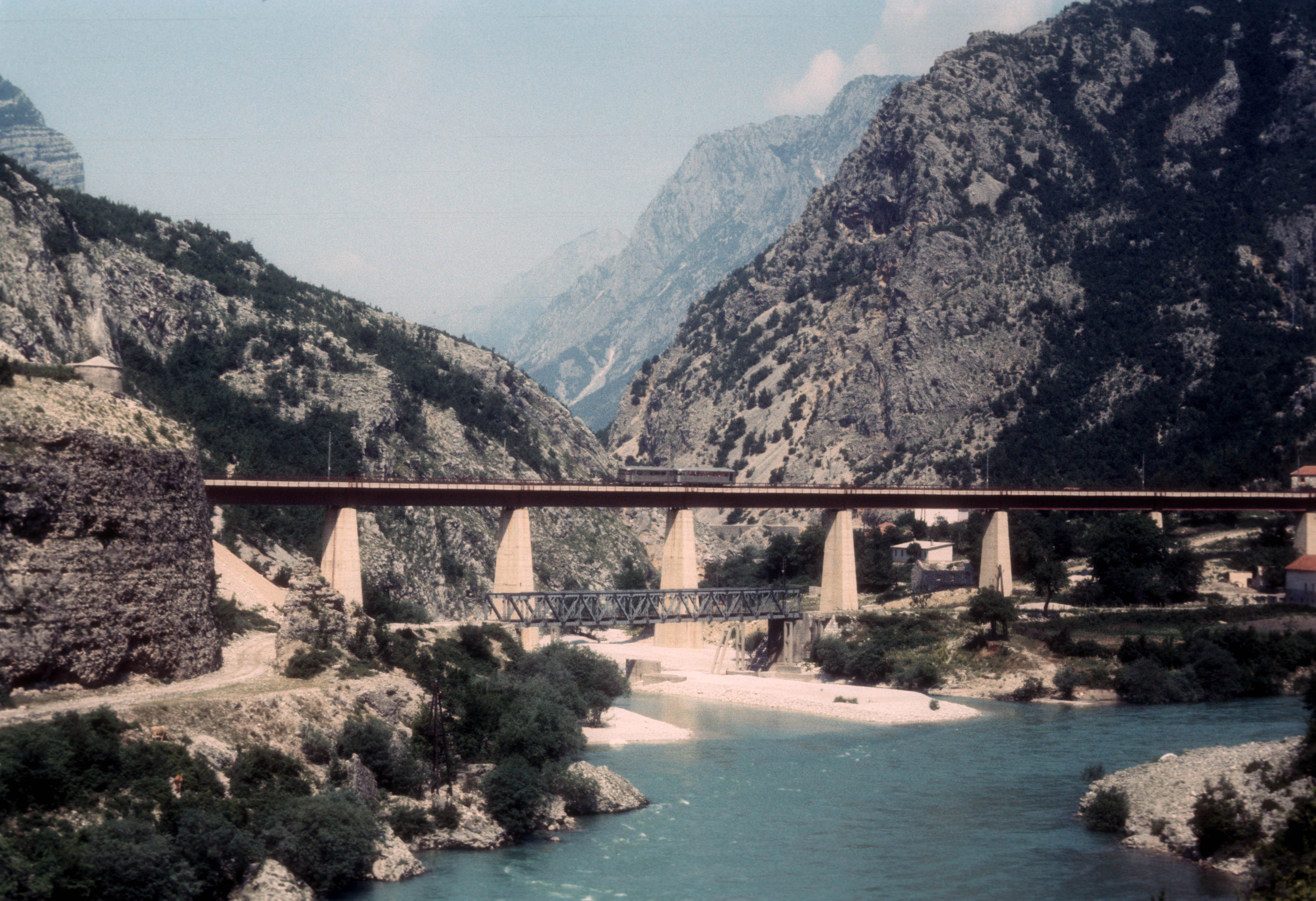
Drežanka estuary, before the construction of HPP Salakovac and a flooding with a Salakovac reservoir

== Geography and hydrology ==
Drežanka springs at the foot of one of Bosnia and Herzegovina's largest mountain, Čvrsnica. Its karst spring rich in water is called Mošćenica or Mošćenuša and is situated at an altitude of 485 m. Not far downstream from the spring there are three waterfalls with a height of 10 to 12 meters.

=== Drežanka Canyon ===
Drežanka Canyon or Canyon of Drežnica is 21 km long, and the catchment area is 146 km^{2}. The catchment area and the course of Drežanka are situated between Čvrsnica (2226 m) in the north and Čabulja (1776 m) in the south. The Drežanka valley stretches in the west–east direction. It flows into the Neretva in the immediate vicinity of Donja Drežnica at an altitude of 112 m. The average drop of Drežanka is 17 ‰. With all its visible layers of rock, both at the bottom and at the top and above it, the Drežanka canyon is a considered by researchers an open-air paleontological museum, where it is possible to find fossils from the geological past spanning as much as 200 million years, from the Triassic, Jurassic, Cretaceous up to the upper Eocene. It undoubtedly represents one of the deepest real canyons in Europe and the world.

== Tourism ==
The favorite bathing place is called Stupina in Draga and until recently jumps were held there as a preparatory competition for jumps from the Old Bridge in Mostar. Crna Stupina in Striževo is also a favorite swimming spot.

The Drežanka source is about eight kilometers away from closest settlement and is a popular hiking trail approximately two-hour walk in length. Not far from the spring there are three waterfalls with a height of 10 to 12 meters.

Also, waterfall Veliki Movran appears seasonally once or twice a year. It is a huge siphon in which water collects all year round, only to explode and empty itself during the heaviest rains, when the mountain siphon is completely filled.
