= Blidinje Lake =

Mountain lake in Bosnia and Herzegovina

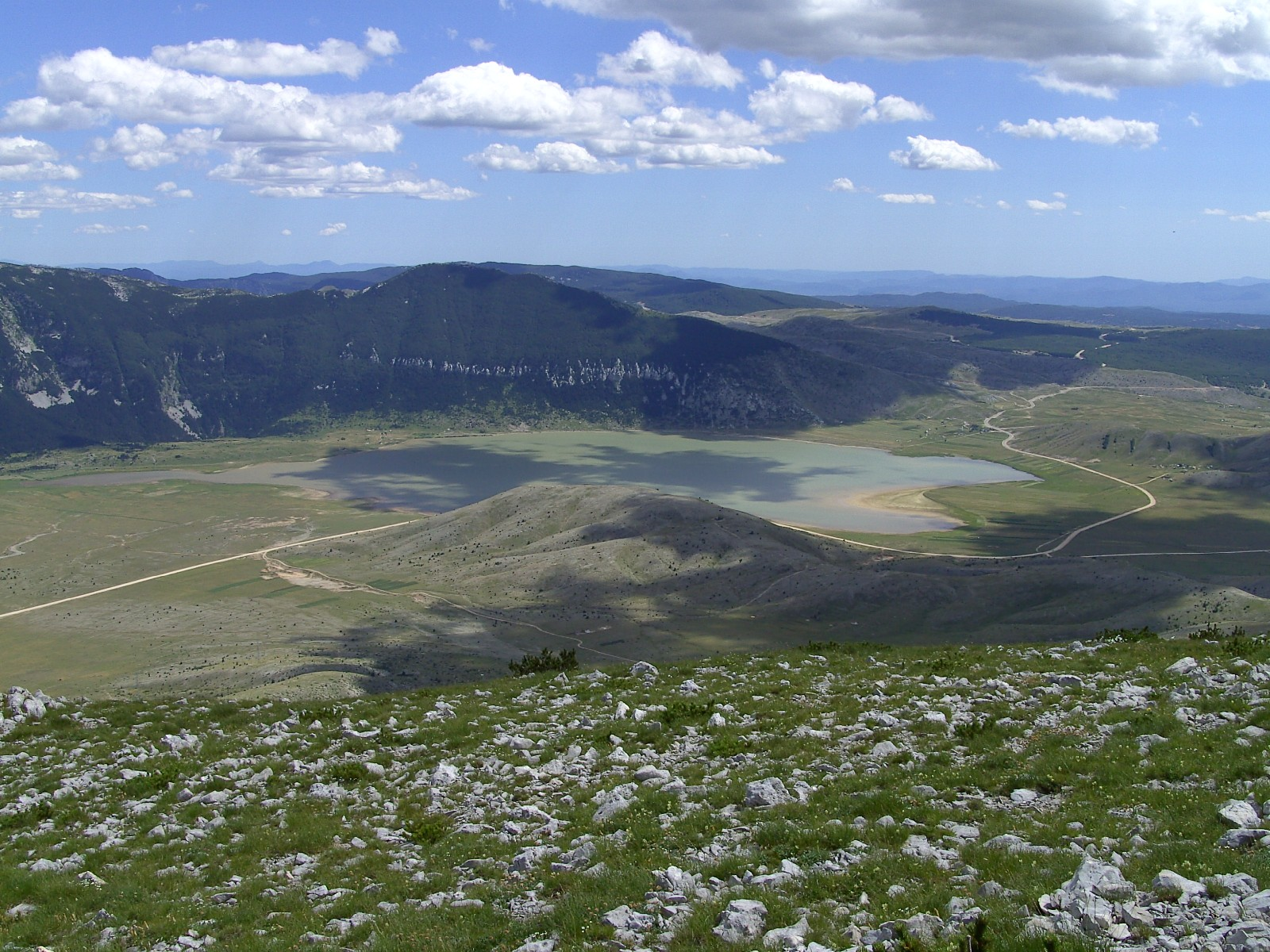
- View of Blidinje Lake from Vran

- Location within Bosnia and Herzegovina
- Interactive map of Blidinje Lake
- Location: Tomislavgrad/Posušje, Bosnia and Herzegovina
- Coordinates: 43°36′25″N 17°29′48″E
- Type: Endorheic
- Basin countries: Bosnia and Herzegovina
- Max. length: 2.5 km (1.6 mi)
- Max. width: 2.1 km (1.3 mi)
- Surface area: 5.25 km^{2} (2.03 sq mi)
- Average depth: 0.5 m (1 ft 8 in)
- Max. depth: 3.0 m (9.8 ft)
- Surface elevation: 1,185 m (3,888 ft)
- Frozen: In winter
- Settlements: Tomislavgrad, Posušje

Blidinje Lake (Croatian: Blidinje jezero), is an alpine lake located in Blidinje Nature Park, on karstic Blidinje plateau, Bosnia and Herzegovina, between Jablanica, Tomislavgrad and Posušje, and is largest of its kind in the country. The lake is most important hydrogeological feature of the park and indeed entire Dinaric Alps karst within Bosnia and Hezegovina.

== Characteristics ==
It is located at an elevation of 1,185 metres (3,888 ft) above sea level and is 2.5 kilometres (1.6 mi) long and 2.1 kilometres (1.3 mi) wide. Maximal depth of the lake is only 4.5 metres (15 ft), while average depth is around 1 metre (3.3 ft). The lake area varies from 2.5 to 6 km2, and the average depth is about 1.9 m.

Blidinje lake is direct result of a glacial retreat, however, according to the Poklečani parochial office documents and recent research into matter of karst hydrology of the plateau, the lake is, also, a product of anthropogenic intervention and activities of human inhabitants. According to these documents, the lake is artificial and it was created at the end of the 19th century. In order to keep the water that is lost through the subterranean passage, local residents and cattle breeders sealed sinkholes with branches and clay, so that water could not find its way underground. Therefore, the lake was formed. Its surface area varies between 2,5 and 6 km^{2}, while its average depth is 1,9 m, with altitude of 1.184 m a.s.l.

== See also ==
- List of lakes in Bosnia and Herzegovina
- List of mountains in Bosnia and Herzegovina
- List of protected areas of Bosnia and Herzegovina
