= Mijat Tomić =

Mijat Tomić (died 1656) was a hajduk who led brigands which fought against Ottoman Empire rule in present-day Bosnia and Herzegovina.

== Biography ==
He was born in the village of Brišnik near Tomislavgrad. Although his exact birth date is uncertain, Mijat is said to have lost his parents at a young age, and by 1640, was known to have had at least two brothers and two sisters.

As a child, Mijat was reputed to have been physically strong, a characteristic that was later proven in future battles. One legend states that he won while competing in some games popular with the local Muslim population. The defeat did not sit well with the Muslims and they decided that he should be killed. Mijat then fled to the mountain Vran, marking the beginning of his life as a hajduk.

Facts about the life of Mijat Tomić were published in the 18th century book Cvit razgovora naroda i jezika iliričkoga aliti rvackoga (1747) by Franciscan priest, Filip Grabovac. In reference to Tomić, Grabovac claimed that, following his death, "never existed a real hajduk like him nor will there ever be one".

Mijat Tomić died on or around 20 July 1656 (on the feast day of St. Elijah) in Doljani, a settlement near Jablanica in present-day Bosnia-Herzegovina. Many poems and legends are in the agreement that he was betrayed by his godfather, Ilija Bobovac. A Venetian source about Mijat's death states that there were more cheers in Sarajevo on the news of his death "than when news arrived about the capture of Baghdad" a few years earlier (1638).

== Trivia ==
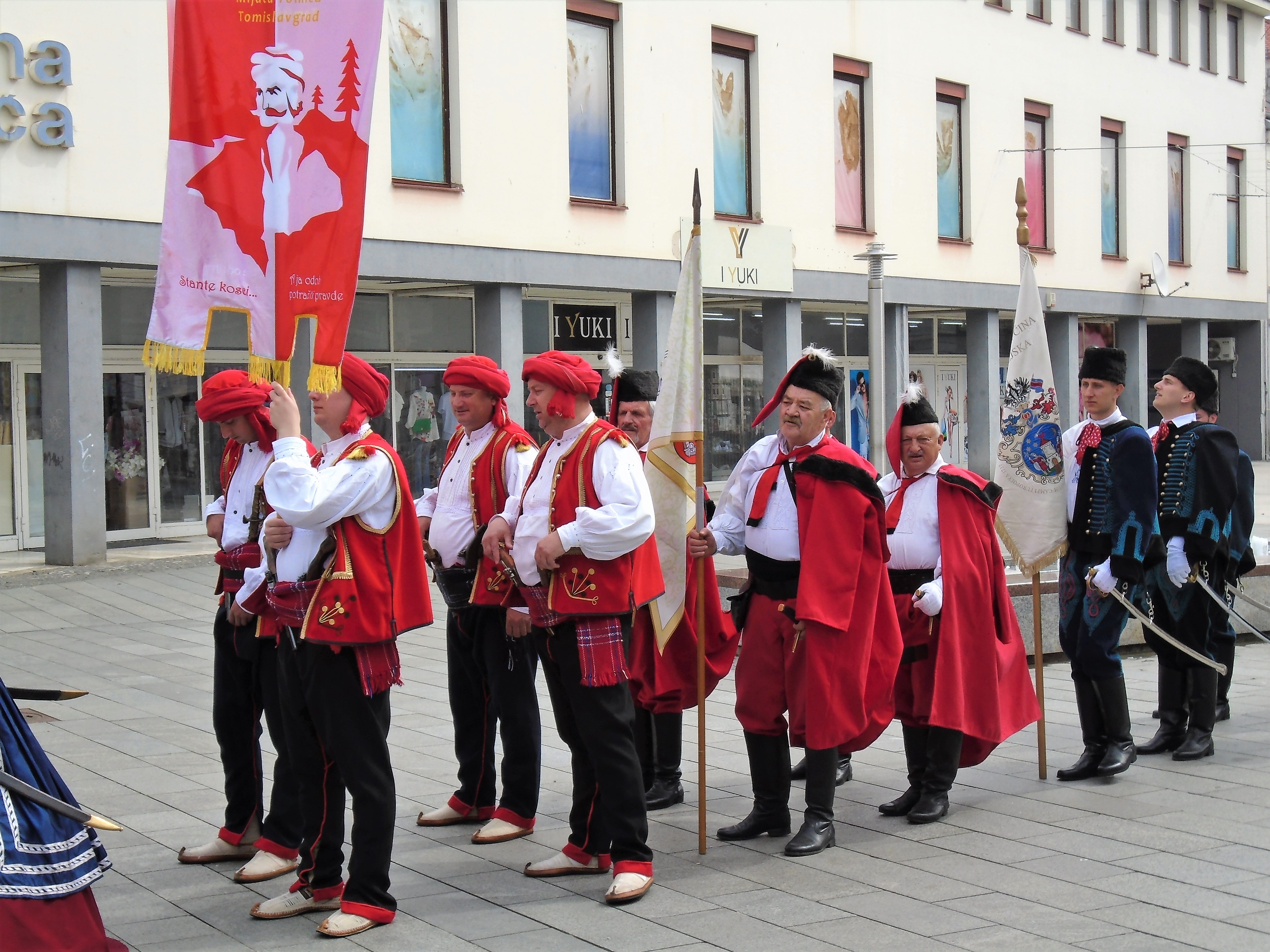
Four members (left side) of the "Mijat Tomić Hajduk Band", a military reenactment group from Tomislavgrad, Bosnia and Herzegovina, visiting Čakovec, Croatia (2023)

Hajdučka Republika Mijata Tomića, a self-proclaimed micronation in Bosnia-Herzegovina, is named after him, and his image is on their national flag.

== See also ==
- Hajduk Veljko

== Sources ==
- MARKO DRAGIĆ Poetika i Povijest Hrvatske Usmene Književnosti, ffst.hr; accessed 30 November 2015.(in Croatian)
