= Doljanka =

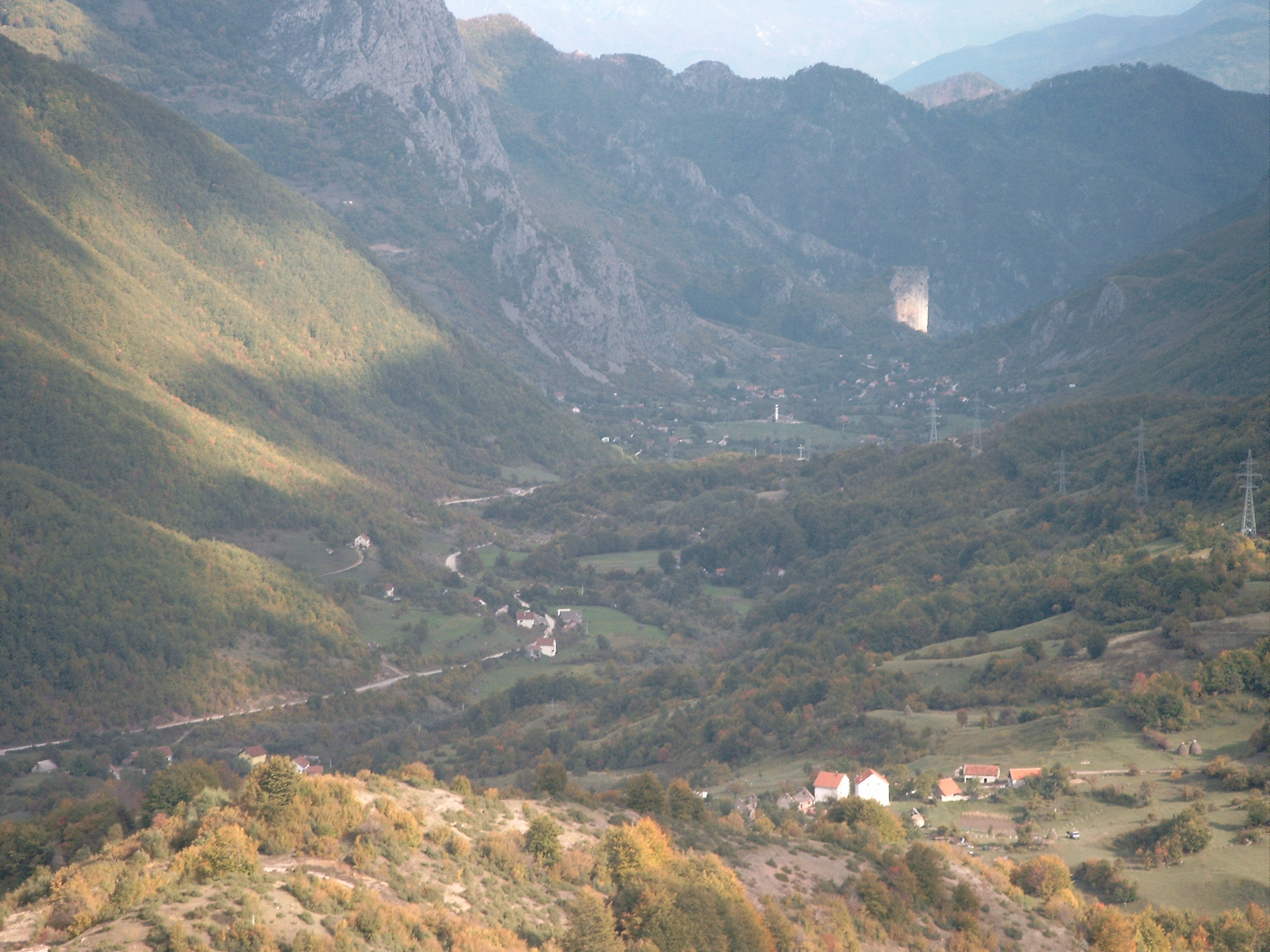
- Doljanka's canyon, and Doljani village

- Location within Bosnia and Herzegovina

Location
- Country: Bosnia and Herzegovina

Physical characteristics
- Mouth
  - location: Neretva
  - coordinates: 43°39′58″N 17°45′30″E

Basin features
- Progression: Neretva→ Adriatic Sea

The Doljanka River is a right tributary of the Neretva river in North Herzegovina, Bosnia and Herzegovina.

The length of Doljanka is around 18 km, and it descends about 400 meters in elevation. It rises from sources scattered under the far northeast slopes of Vran mountain at 1324 meters elevation. It runs through limestone canyon, which is up to 1,200 meters deep, and flows through the village of Doljani.

The Doljanka flows into the Neretva River between Jablanica and Mostar, at an elevation of 300 m. It is also the connection over which trout from the Neretva crossing in Doljanka during spawning. The watershed of the Doljanka encompasses the area between the mountains Baćine in the north and Čvrsnica in the south: it is 69 km^{2} in area. It receives a small number of tributaries (Bijeli potok, Trn, Loznik, and Cvitan), so that water mainly comes from underground karst water.

The water level of the river is slightly lower compared to other Neretva tributaries, because its riverbed is rocky and sandy, which allows brown trout and its natural food. The difference in water level in summer compared to winter is quite large.
