= Dulovo, Staroselskoye Rural Settlement, Vologodsky District, Vologda Oblast =

Dulovo Дулово
- Village
- Location within Vologda Oblast Location within Russia
- Coordinates: 59°18′N 39°12′E
- Country: Russia
- Region: Vologda Oblast
- District: Vologodsky District
- Time zone: UTC+3:00

Dulovo (Russian: Дулово) is a rural locality (a village) in Staroselskoye Rural SettlementVologodsky District, Vologda Oblast, Russia. The population was 12 as of 2002.

== Geography ==
The distance to Vologda is 64 km, to Striznevo is 13 km. Gorka, Yakovlevo, Isakovo are the nearest rural localities.
