= Diva Grabovica Valley =

- Diva Grabovica
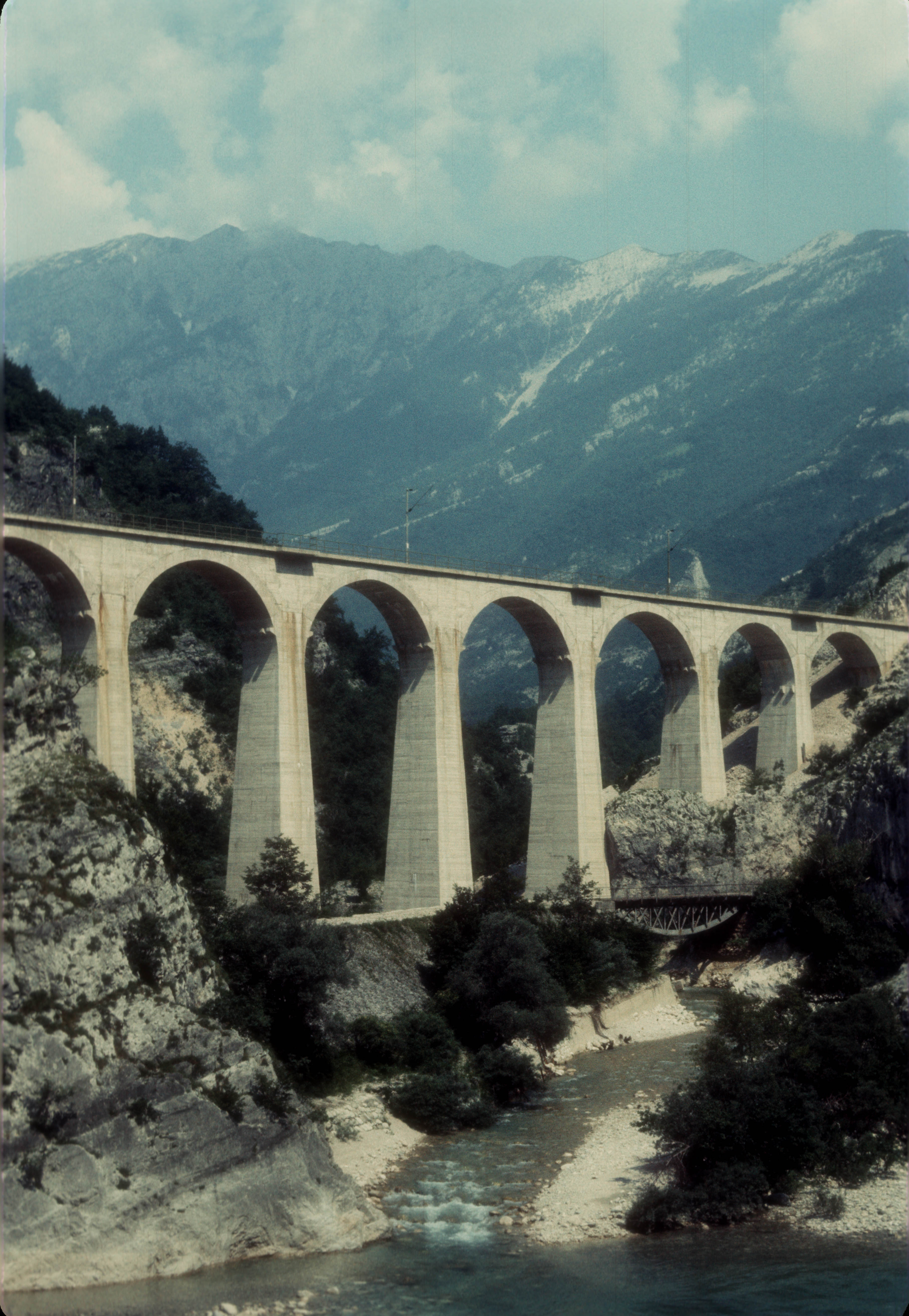
- Diva Grabovica Valley seen from the confluence of Diva Grabovica creek and the Neretva (now flooded by Grabovica reservoir).
- Interactive map of Diva Grabovica Valley
- Location: Bosnia and Herzegovina
- Nearest city: Jablanica
- Coordinates: 43.606051664495205°N 17.68825777993787°E
- Length: 6.2 km (3.9 mi)

Diva Grabovica Valley or Grabovica Valley or simply Diva Grabovica is a valley centered on Diva Grabovica settlement and surrounding an eponymous mountain creek which cuts through 1500 metres deep and some 6 km long gorge between steep mountain slopes of Čvrsnica. The creek is intermittent right tributary of the Neretva, and a valley follows its west–east axes perpendicular to the Neretva course. The main settlements Diva Grabovica consists of number of hamlets and is part of the territory of the city of Mostar, in Bosnia and Herzegovina. Valley is part of the Nature Park Blidinje.

== See also ==
- Drežnica Valley
