= Risovac, Jablanica =

Risovac
- Village
- Location within Bosnia and Herzegovina
- Country: Bosnia and Herzegovina
- Entity: Federation of Bosnia and Herzegovina
- Canton: Herzegovina-Neretva
- Municipality: Jablanica

Area
  - Total: 17.71 sq mi (45.87 km^{2})

Population (2013)
  - Total: 63
  - Density: 3.6/sq mi (1.4/km^{2})
- Time zone: UTC+1 (CET)
  - Summer (DST): UTC+2 (CEST)

Risovac is a village in the municipality of Jablanica, Bosnia and Herzegovina.

== Demographics ==
According to the 2013 census, its population was 63.

Ethnicity in 2013
Ethnicity	Number	Percentage
Croats	62	98.4%
other/undeclared	1	1.6%
Total	63	100%

== Economy and tourism ==
=== Ski resort Risovac ===
A leisure and recreational tourism flourished in the village since 2000's. Being situated at the Blidinje plateau under the slopes of Čvrsnica, a suitable weather and altitude characteristics for winter sports, primarily skiing, are used to develop a ski resort.
