= List of karst plateaus in Bosnia and Herzegovina =

The following list consists of Dinaric karst highland plateaus in Bosnia and Herzegovina:

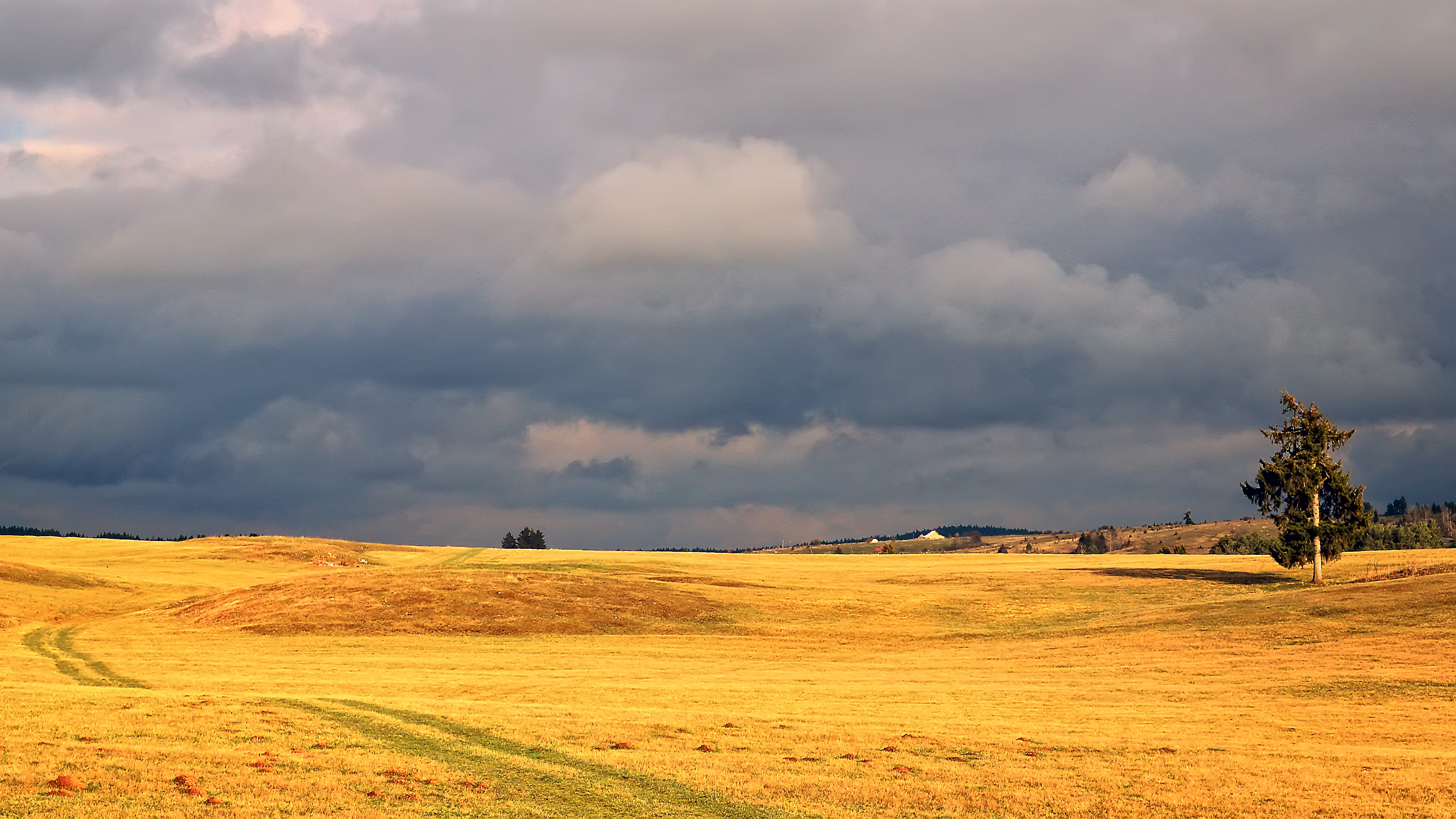
Plateau of Romanija, near Sarajevo, Bosnia and Herzegovina

== List of karst plateaus ==
- Romanija plateau
- Luburić plateau, Romanija
- Glasinac plateau, Romanija
- Grabež plateau, Bihać
- Grabovica plateau
- Nišići plateau & Bijambare
- Borci plateau, Konjic, Glavatičevo
- Vučevo plateau (Maglić)
- Zagorje plateau, Kalinovik (Lelija)
- Crna Gora plateau, Nevesinje, Glavatičevo (Prenj)
- Morine plateau, Ulog (Crvanj)
- Blace plateau, Blace (Bjelašnica)
- Blidinje plateau
