= Crvenjak Lake =

Glacial lake on Čvrsnica, Bosnia and Herzegovina

- Location within Bosnia and Herzegovina
- Interactive map of Crvenjak Lake
- Location: Bosnia and Herzegovina
- Coordinates: 43°37′33.0″N 17°38′56.0″E
- Type: glacial lake
- Primary inflows: rain and snow
- Catchment area: Čvrsnica massive
- Max. length: 7 metres (23 ft)
- Max. width: 5 metres (16 ft)
- Max. depth: 9 metres (30 ft)
- Frozen: winter

Crvenjak Lake (Bosnian: Crvenjakjezero) is a small glacial lake in Bosnia and Herzegovina. It is located on the Čvrsnica mountain, which is part of wider Blidinje plateau. The lake is oval-shaped, approximately 70 meters long and 50 meters wide. It has a depth of approximately 9 meters.

== See also ==
- List of lakes in Bosnia and Herzegovina
