= Gornja Grabovica, Jablanica =

Gornja Grabovica
- Village
- Location within Bosnia and Herzegovina
- Country: Bosnia and Herzegovina
- Entity: Federation of Bosnia and Herzegovina
- Canton: Herzegovina-Neretva
- Municipality: Jablanica
- Elevation: 1,503 ft (458 m)
- Time zone: UTC+1 (CET)
  - Summer (DST): UTC+2 (CEST)

Gornja Grabovica is a small village in the municipality of Jablanica, Bosnia and Herzegovina. It is situated on the eastern edge of the Blidinje Nature Park, approximately 26 kilometers from the city of Mostar and around 60 kilometers from Sarajevo, the capital of Bosnia and Herzegovina.
