= Drežnica oil shale deposit =

Location
- Location: Bujanovac, Pčinja District, Serbia

Production
- Products: Oil shale

The Drežnica oil shale deposit is an oil shale deposit located in Bujanovac, Pčinja District, Serbia. The deposit has oil shale reserves amounting to 65 million tonnes, one of the largest oil shale reserves in Serbia and Europe and has an organic content equivalent to 3.3 million tonnes of shale oil.
