= Poklečani =

- Village
- Location within Bosnia and Herzegovina
- Coordinates: 43°33′N 17°26′E
- Country: Bosnia and Herzegovina
- Entity: Federation of Bosnia and Herzegovina
- Canton: West Herzegovina Canton
- Municipality: Posušje

Area
  - Total: 25.37 km^{2} (9.80 sq mi)

Population (2013)
  - Total: 949
  - Density: 37.4/km^{2} (96.9/sq mi)
- Time zone: UTC+1 (CET)
  - Summer (DST): UTC+2 (CEST)

Poklečani is a village in the municipality of Posušje in West Herzegovina Canton, the Federation of Bosnia and Herzegovina, Bosnia and Herzegovina.

== Demographics ==
According to the 2013 census, its population was 949.

Ethnicity in 2013
Ethnicity	Number	Percentage
Croats	948	99.9%
other/undeclared	1	0.1%
Total	949	100%

== Bibliography ==
- Ethnicity/National Affiliation, Religion and Mother Tongue (PDF). Sarajevo: Agency for Statistics of Bosnia and Herzegovina. 2019.
