= Striževo =

- Village
- Location within Bosnia and Herzegovina
- Coordinates: 43.5674043°N 17.5353797°E
- Country: Bosnia and Herzegovina
- Entity: Federation of Bosnia and Herzegovina
- Canton: Herzegovina-Neretva
- Municipality: City of Mostar

Area
  - Total: 13.20 sq mi (34.18 km^{2})

Population (2013)
  - Total: 413
  - Density: 31.3/sq mi (12.1/km^{2})
- Time zone: UTC+1 (CET)
  - Summer (DST): UTC+2 (CEST)

Striževo is a village in the City of Mostar, Bosnia and Herzegovina.

== Demographics ==
According to the 2013 census, its population was 413.

Ethnicity in 2013
Ethnicity	Number	Percentage
Bosniaks	411	99.5%
Croats	1	0.2%
other/undeclared	1	0.2%
Total	413	100%
