= Vran =

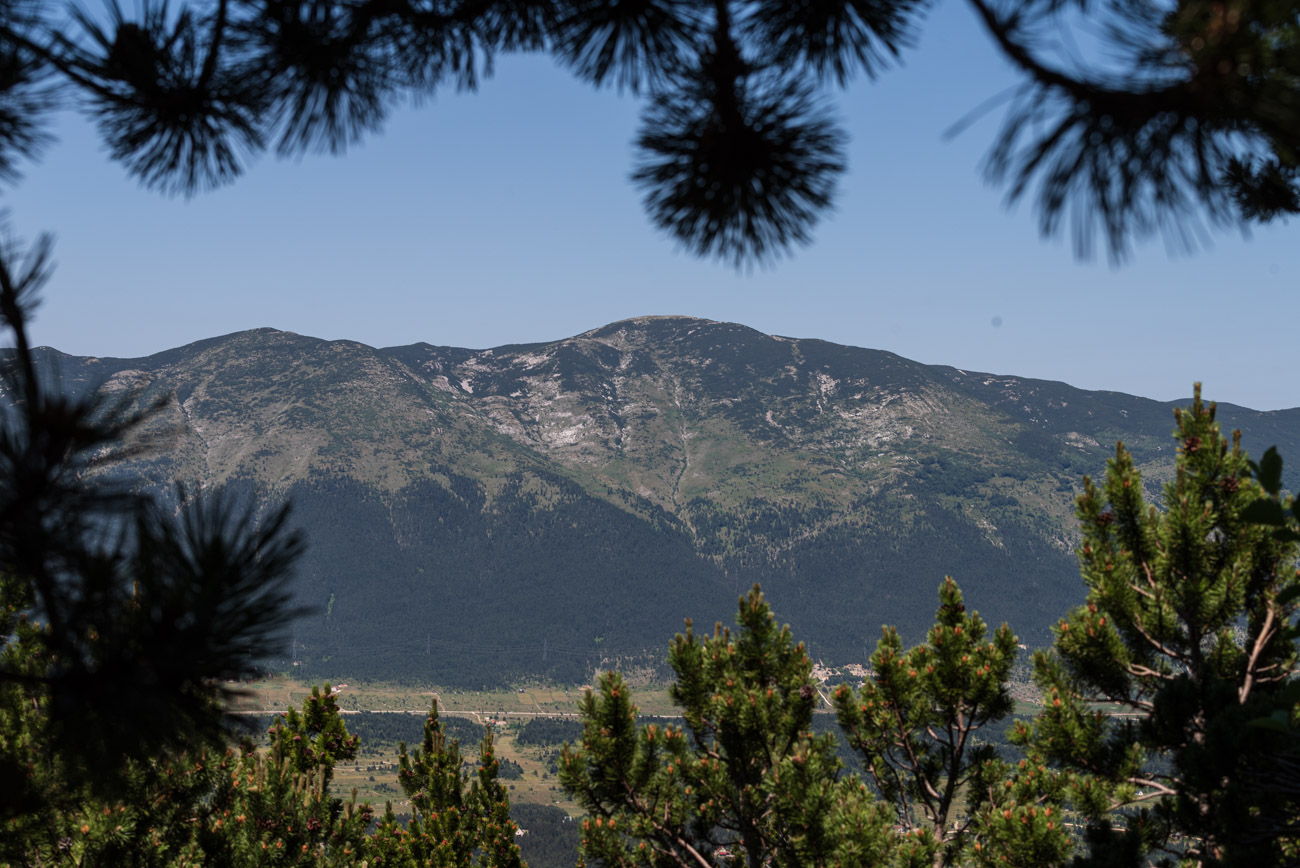
- Veliki Vran peak from Črvsnica mountain

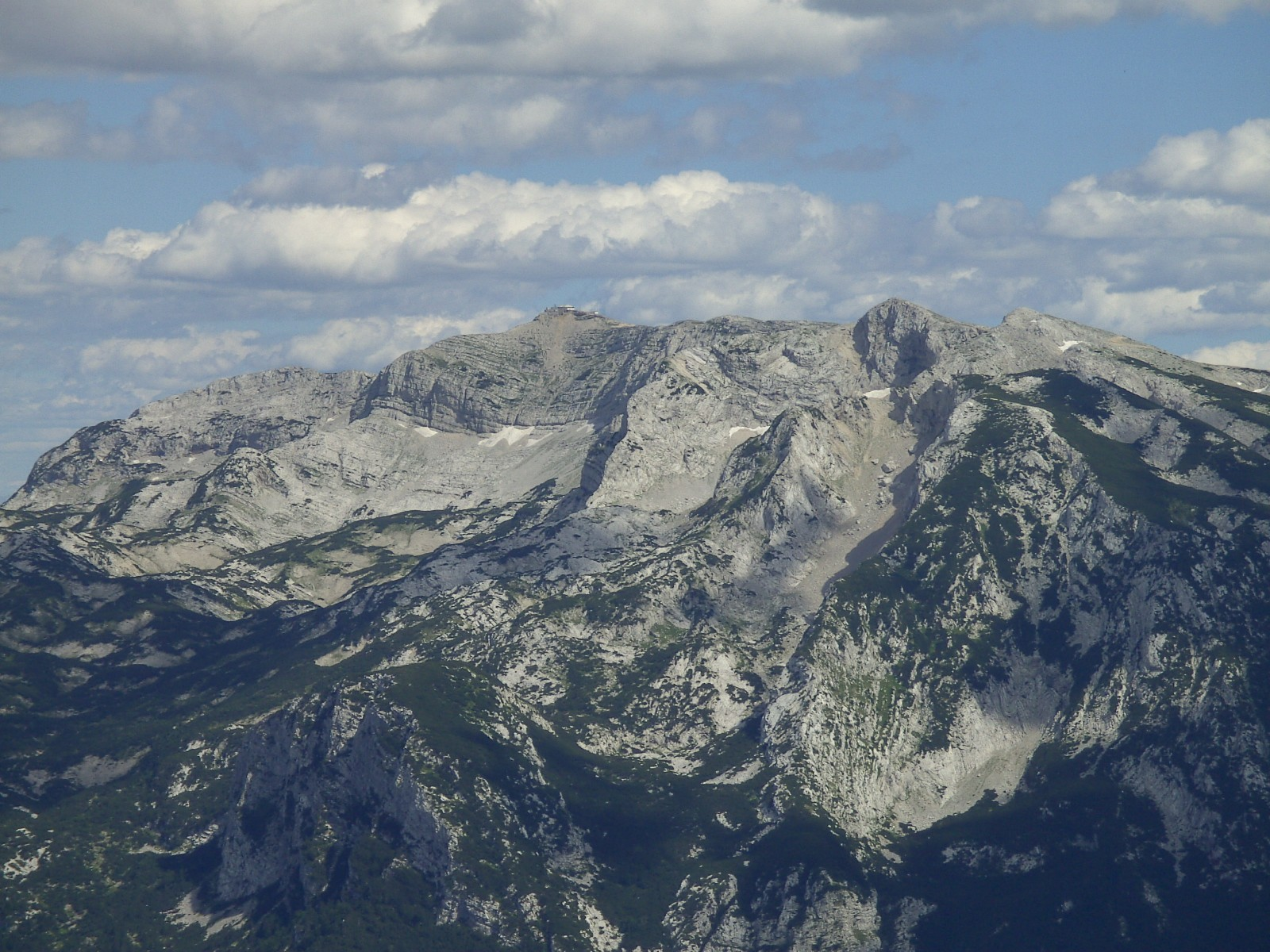

Highest point
- Elevation: 2,074 m (6,804 ft)
- Coordinates: 43°40′05″N 17°30′20″E

Geography
- Location within Bosnia and Herzegovina
- Location: Bosnia and Herzegovina
- Parent range: Dinaric Alps

Vran (Serbian Cyrillic: Вран) is a mountain in the municipality of Tomislavgrad, Bosnia and Herzegovina. It has an altitude of 2,074 metres (6,804 ft). Vran along the Čvrsnica, Dugo Polje, and other karstic features forms the Blidinje plateau.

== See also ==
- List of mountains in Bosnia and Herzegovina
