= Gornja Drežnica =

- Village
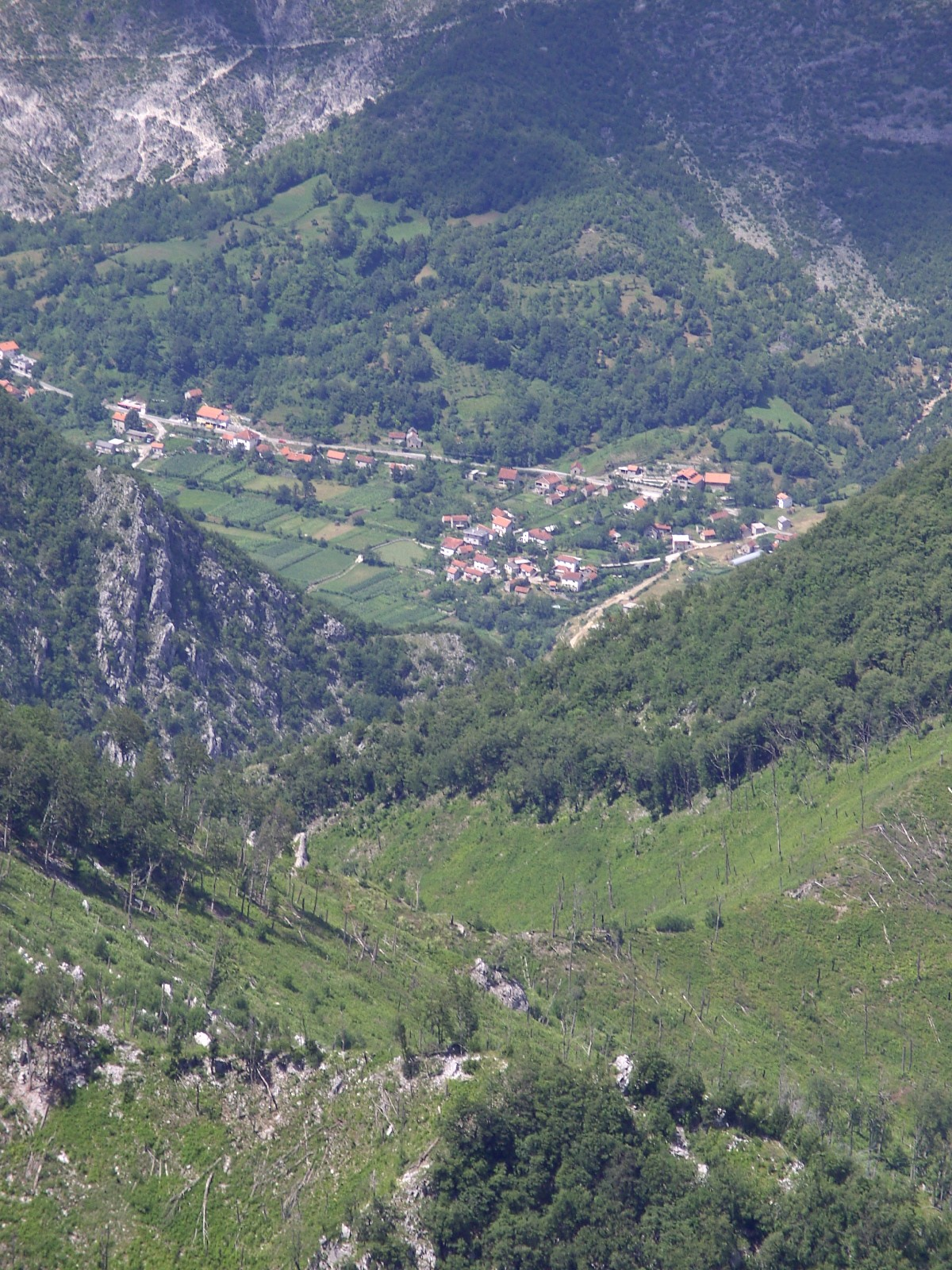
- Gornja Dreznica in the Čabulja mountains

- Location within Bosnia and Herzegovina
- Coordinates: 43.5727527°N 17.4821647°E
- Country: Bosnia and Herzegovina
- Entity: Federation of Bosnia and Herzegovina
- Canton: Herzegovina-Neretva
- Municipality: City of Mostar

Area
  - Total: 21.67 sq mi (56.12 km^{2})

Population (2013)
  - Total: 1,000
  - Density: 46/sq mi (18/km^{2})
- Time zone: UTC+1 (CET)
  - Summer (DST): UTC+2 (CEST)

Gornja Drežnica is a village in the City of Mostar, Bosnia and Herzegovina.

== Demographics ==
According to the 2013 census, its population was 1,000.

Ethnicity in 2013
Ethnicity	Number	Percentage
Bosniaks	977	97.7%
Croats	13	1.3%
other/undeclared	10	1.0%
Total	1,000	100%

== See also ==
- Donja Drežnica
