= Čvrsnica =

Mountain in Bosnia and Herzegovina

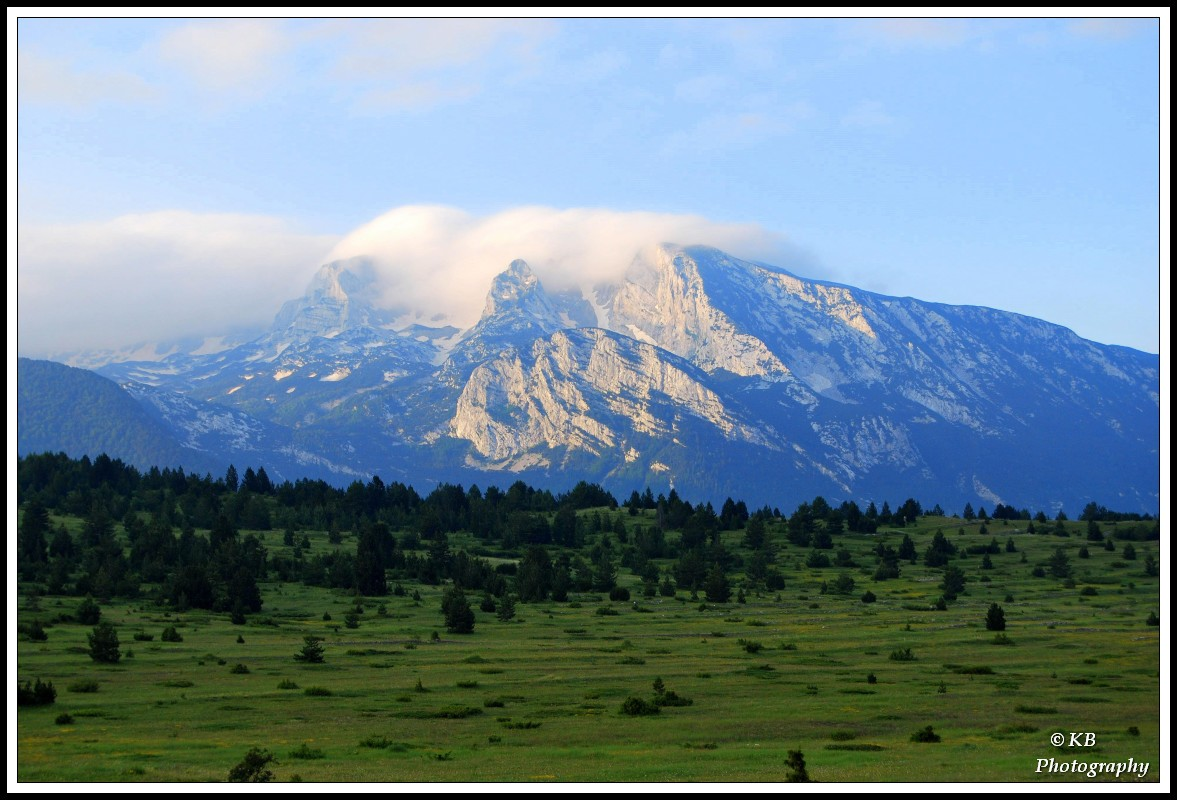

Highest point
- Elevation: 2,227.3 m (7,307 ft)
- Prominence: 1,350 m (4,430 ft)
- Listing: Ribu
- Coordinates: 43°35′56″N 17°33′52″E

Geography
- Location within Bosnia and Herzegovina
- Location: Bosnia and Herzegovina
- Parent range: Dinaric Alps

Čvrsnica (Serbian Cyrillic: Чврсница, pronounced [t͡ʃʋr̩snit͡sa]) is a mountain in the Dinarides of Bosnia and Herzegovina, located in northern Herzegovina. Most of the mountain is located in the Herzegovina-Neretva Canton municipalities of Mostar and Jablanica, while a small part of it, around 10%, is located in the municipality of Posušje. Pločno is the highest peak at 2,228 metres above sea level.

Čvrsnica is surrounded by the river Neretva (20 km) and Diva Grabovica canyon (6.2 km), which cuts into the mountain from the east, the Neretva tributaries Doljanka (18 km) from the north and Drežanka (19.8 km) from the south, and Dugo Polje karstic field (12 km) and Vran mountain from the west. There are more than ten summits above 2,000 m (Pločno 2,228 m, Veliki Jelinak 2,179 m, Veliki Vilinac 2,118 m, etc.), large vertical cliffs (Pesti Brdo, Mezica Stijene, Strmenica, etc.), and the mountain consists of several plateaus — Plasa and Muharnica on north, Mala Čvrsnica on south. Čvrsnica along with Vran, Dugo Polje, and other mentioned karstic features form the spacious Blidinje plateau, which also includes lakes of Blidinje, Crepulja and Crvenjak.

Bio-life is characteristic of its three climate areas: conifers above 1200 m, plateau with grass and junipers; numerous endemic species (like Munika Pine). Čvrsnica is well known as a home of chamois.

== Climate ==
The mountain exhibits three types of climate: Mediterranean at the base of the mountain, central European on hillsides and alpine on summits and plateaus. Six months have average temperatures below zero degrees Celsius. January and February have 15–23 days of snow precipitation. Snow layer thickness can be 2.5–3 m. Strong wind can make snowdrifts even 15 m thick. The upper plateau is under the snow from November until April — in hidden parts snow remains whole year.

=== Trivia ===
Hajdučka Republika Mijata Tomića, a self-proclaimed micronation, the parodical project, is located between this mountain and the mountain Vran.

== Bibliography ==
- Poljak, Željko (February 1959). "Čvrsnica". Kazalo za "Hrvatski planinar" i "Naše planine" 1898—1958 (PDF) (in Croatian). Vol. XI. p. 22. ISSN 0354-0650.
- Guber, Mihovil (1943). "Pustošenje planinarskih objekata u južnoj Hrvatskoj" [The Desolation of Mountain Objects in Southern Croatia] (PDF). Hrvatski planinar (in Croatian). Vol. 39, no. 6–7. pp. 85–93. ISSN 0354-0650.
