= Donja Drežnica =

- Village
- Location within Bosnia and Herzegovina
- Coordinates: 43.5362069°N 17.642841°E
- Country: Bosnia and Herzegovina
- Entity: Federation of Bosnia and Herzegovina
- Canton: Herzegovina-Neretva
- Municipality: City of Mostar

Area
  - Total: 22.44 sq mi (58.12 km^{2})

Population (2013)
  - Total: 717
  - Density: 32.0/sq mi (12.3/km^{2})
- Time zone: UTC+1 (CET)
  - Summer (DST): UTC+2 (CEST)

Donja Drežnica is a village in the City of Mostar, Bosnia and Herzegovina.

== Demographics ==
According to the 2013 census, its population was 717.

Ethnicity in 2013
Ethnicity	Number	Percentage
Bosniaks	697	97.2%
Croats	12	1.7%
Serbs	1	0.1%
other/undeclared	7	1.0%
Total	717	100%

== See also ==
- Gornja Drežnica
