= Čabulja =

- Чабуља
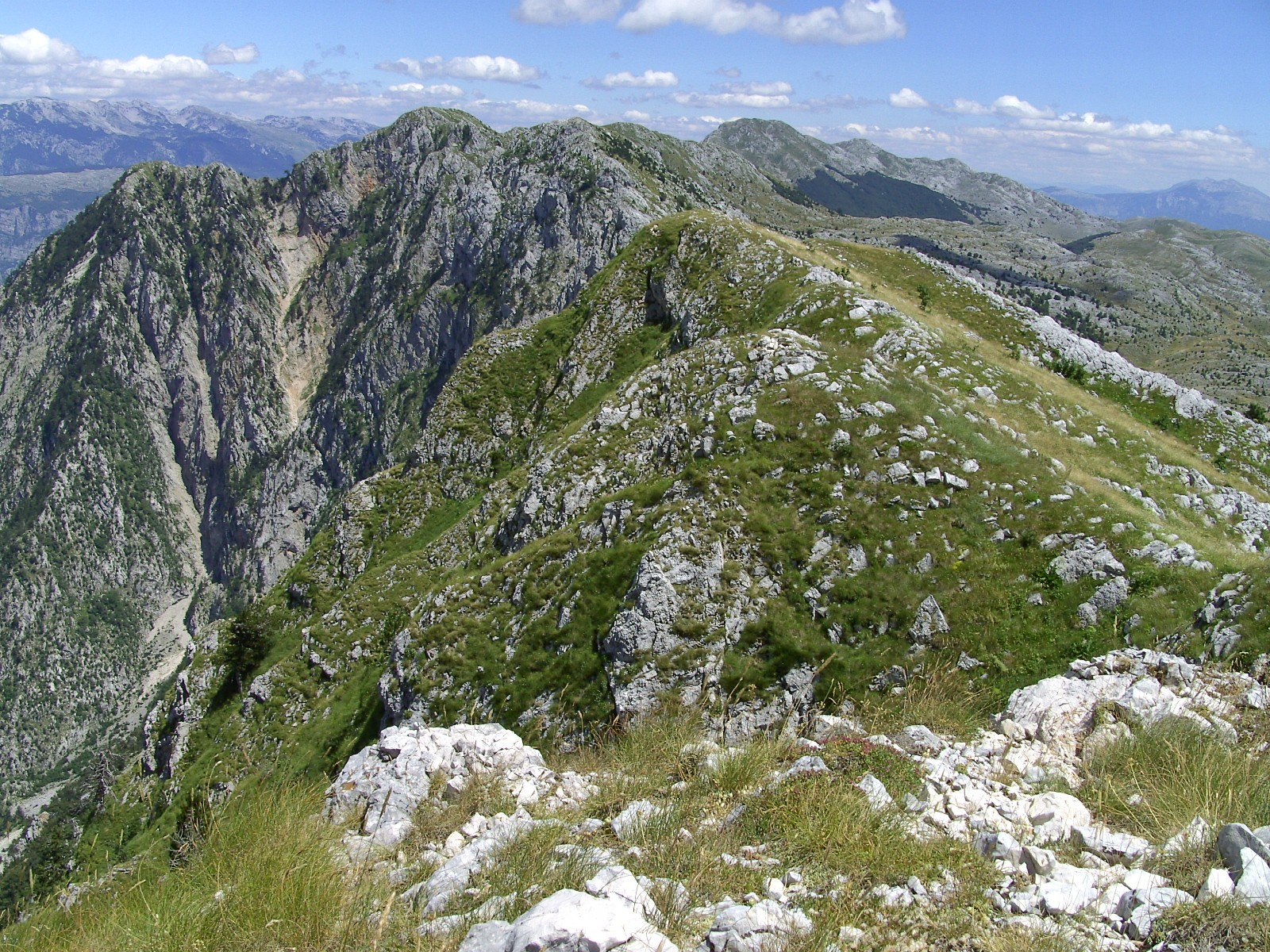

Highest point
- Elevation: 1,786 m (5,860 ft)
- Coordinates: 43°29′N 17°39′E

Geography
- Location within Bosnia and Herzegovina
- Location: Bosnia and Herzegovina
- Parent range: Dinaric Alps

Čabulja (Serbian Cyrillic: Чабуља) is a mountain in the Dinaric Alps in the municipality of Mostar, Bosnia and Herzegovina. The highest point Velika Vlajna has an altitude of 1,786 metres (5,860 ft).

== See also ==
- List of mountains in Bosnia and Herzegovina
