= NK Vir Posušje =

NK Vir
- Full name: Nogometni Klub Vir
- Founded: 1978
- Dissolved: 2013
- Ground: Malo polje, Vir (Posušje), Posušje
- Capacity: 1000
- League: Međužupanijska liga HBŽ i ZHŽ
- 2012–13: MŽNL, 5th
Home colours	Away colours

Nogometni Klub Vir (English: Football Club Vir) is a Croatian football club, which plays in the town of Vir near Posušje. They currently play in the Druga liga FBiH Jug. Season 2007/08. again finished second last on the 14th in the Second League South as the previous season, but unlike then, Vir was knocked out in the inter-county league. After four seasons with the inter-county league back to the Second League in the South, but before the start of the season, giving up on the competition because of financial problems.
