= Vinjani =

Vinjani may refer to:

- Vinjani, Bosnia and Herzegovina, a village near Posušje
- Donji Vinjani, a village near Imotski, Croatia
- Gornji Vinjani, a village near Imotski, Croatia
