= Ivan Franjo Jukić =

Bosnian writer and Franciscan friar (1818–1857)

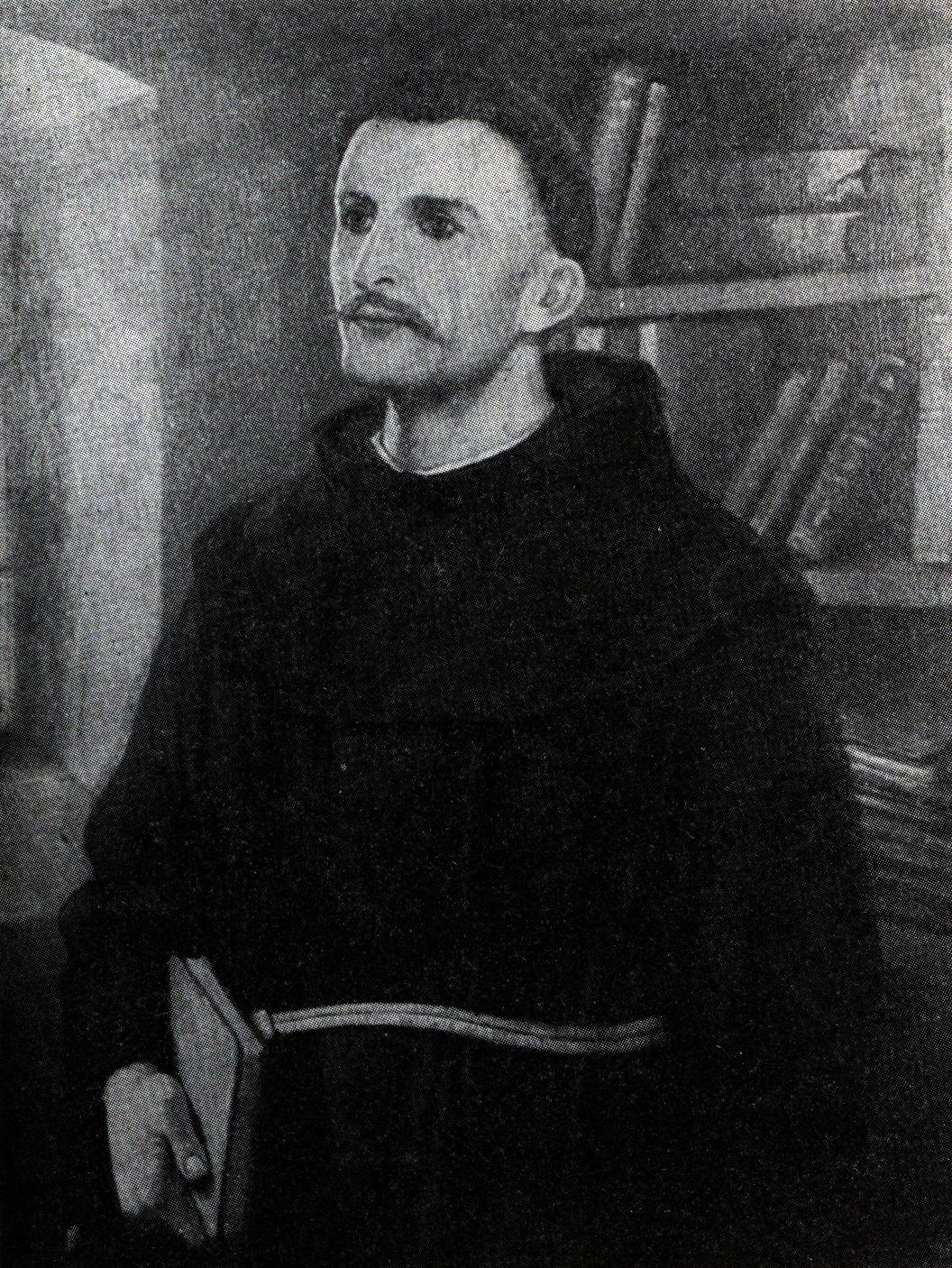
- Fra Ivan Frano Jukić
- Born: 8 July 1818; Banja Luka, Bosnia Eyalet, Ottoman Empire
- Died: 20 May 1857 (aged 38); Vienna, Austrian Empire
- Resting place: Vienna, Austria
- Citizenship: Ottoman Empire, Austro-Hungarian Empire
- Occupation: Friar
- Writing career
- Pen name: Slavoljub Bošnjak (lit. 'Slavophile Bosnian')
- Language: Serbo-Croatian
- Genres: Social science, poetry
- Subjects: History, politics, culture
- Notable work: Zemljopis i poviestnica Bosne
- Movement: Illyrian

Ivan Franjo Jukić (8 July 1818 – 20 May 1857) was a Bosnian Catholic writer and Franciscan friar from Bosnia and Herzegovina, whose life and cultural and political legacy have left an indelible mark on the cultural history of the country, where he is remembered as one of the founders of Bosnian modernism. He mainly wrote under the pseudonym Slavoljub Bošnjak (lit. 'Slavophile Bosnian').

== Biography ==
Ivan Jukić was born in Banja Luka, Ottoman Empire (in modern-day Bosnia and Herzegovina) to Jozo and Klara Jukić. His paternal grandfather settled there from Herzegovina.

In 1830, he was sent to the Fojnica friary and took the religious name Franjo. In 1835, he came to Zagreb, where he studied philosophy and met the protagonists of the Illyrian movement. As other Bosnian Franciscans educated in Zagreb, he propounded the Illyrian ideology. He started collaborating with Danica ilirska early on upon his arrival in Zagreb. In 1837, he went to Veszprém to study theology, and from there, he wrote his first songs and sent them to Ljudevit Gaj, whom he had previously met in Zagreb.

In Hungary, Jukić met a certain Bosnian trader called Jovanović, who convinced Jukić and three of his young friends that there was an uprising in the works to free Bosnia from the rule of the Ottoman Empire. The four returned to Bosnia in 1840 to aid the effort. Still, as soon as they arrived, they were met by fra Marijan Šunjić from Orašje who told them that this idea was hopeless at the time, and sent them off to the Fojnica monastery with a letter recommending that the Franciscan provincial find them a refuge outside Bosnia. They were sent to Dubrovnik, where they spent the next two years out of harm's way.

In Dubrovnik, Jukić met Božidar Petranović, the editor of the Serb-Dalmatian magazine (Srpsko-dalmatinski magazin), who published Jukić's first books. In 1842, Jukić returned to Bosnia and documented his trip, and made further trips around the country in 1843 and 1845, both to Bosnia and to Slavonia and Dalmatia. In 1846, he returned to the Fojnica monastery for another two years. He sent a letter to Ljudevit Gaj stating his intention to form a literary society aimed at enlightenment, but this never came to fruition.

In 1848, Jukić moved to Varcar-Vakuf (Mrkonjić Grad) to become a chaplain. In 1849/1850, he reported having 30 Catholic and 17 Orthodox children in his school, making that the first school without a religiously segregated student population in Bosnia. There, he also wrote Slavodobitnica together with fra Grga Martić, a song about the Bosnian governor Omar Pasha, whom he befriended.

However, in 1851, he published his proclamation Requests and pleas of the Christians in Bosnia and Herzegovina, and fell out of favour with Omar Pasha so much that he was banished to Istanbul and ordered never to return to his home country. Jukić then moved to Rome, then spent some time in Dalmatia, and then moved back to Rome, then to Ancona and Venice.

In 1854, he moved to Đakovo, where the bishop Strossmayer found him a chapel to tend to in Trnava and Drenje. However, as early as 1856, Jukić became gravely ill and had to move to Vienna for medical treatment. Jukić's life was cut short at 38 in 1857 when he died in Vienna, then a part of the Austrian Empire.

== Work and impact ==
Having lived during one of the most dramatic periods in Bosnia's history, which was marked by the insurgency of the Bosnian Muslim nobility (led by Husein Gradaščević) against the attempts of its Ottoman administrators to carry out modernizing reforms throughout their ailing empire, Jukić was fascinated by the idea of liberal civic order, equality and national freedom for South Slavs. In that, he followed the idealism and strong impulse for national independence of similar movements in Serbia and Croatia.

Together with Marijan Šunjić, Martin Nedić, Jako Baltić, Blaž Josić and fra Grgo Martić, Jukić's cultural and political orientation was based on the para-political tradition of Bosna Srebrena as a Franciscan province and the only officially recognized entity under the influence of the Catholic Church in the Ottoman Balkans at the time.

Founder and editor of the first literary magazine in Bosnia and Herzegovina, Bosanski prijatelj (Bosnian Friend), Jukić was an advocate of the religion-independent cultural identity which put into practice the idea of universal civic education not tied to religious affiliation. For him, as Ivan Lovrenović observed in his seminal work Bosanski Hrvati, ethnic and denominational borders of the Bosnian microcosm were neither absolute nor God-given. The magazine was a forerunner of the newspaper in Bosnia and Herzegovina, with many historians characterising it as the first newspaper. It was published, according to Jukić, who also entirely authored the first issue, "in pure Croatian language". The historical, cultural and ethnological subjects encompassed the Croatian corpus's historical events, people and customs. The first two issues were dedicated only to Catholic writers. The term "Bošnjak" used in the newspaper implied only Catholic and Eastern Orthodox populace, while the term for the Bosnian Muslims was "Bosnian Turks". For example, while advocating for the collection of funds for public schools, Jukić considered only the schools for Christians "of both denominations", excluding the Muslims.

Jukić's famous 1850 memorandum to the Ottoman government, titled Želje i molbe kristjanah u Bosni i Hercegovini, koje ponizno prikazuju njegovom veličanstvu sretnovladajućem sultanu Abdul-Medžidu, represents the first draft of a European-inspired civic constitution in the history of Bosnia and Herzegovina. In it, Jukić demands that the Catholic and Orthodox populations of Bosnia are no longer called raja but citizens of the Ottoman Empire, just like the ruling Muslim stratum of the Bosnian society at the time.

In 1851, Jukić published a history of Bosnia. In it, he wrote that the Bosnian Muslim aristocracy "sprang from the bad Christians who turned Muslim, because only thus could they protect their land.

However, Jukić's national belonging was always. It was primarily defined as Bosnian (he regularly wrote under the pseudonym of Slavoljub Bošnjak (Slavophile Bosnian), and in such a way to include all ethnic and denominational groups inhabiting this space. The only other cultural identity he recognised was Illyrian, as a cultural supra-identity of all South Slavs; however, he never saw the future or destiny of Bosnia as anything else but its national and organisational unity. Until his death, no other idea of the collective cultural identity of Bosnians and Herzegovinians had a more significant presence or a more significant advocate.

== See also ==
- Antun Knežević
