= Martin Nedić =

Bosnian poet

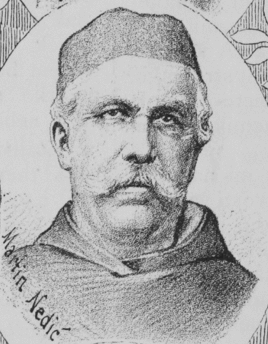
Martin Nedić

Martin Nedić (Tolisa 1 April 1810 – 26 April 1895) was a Bosnian poet. He wrote mostly under the pseudonym "Stari Ilir iz Bosne" (Old Illyrian from Bosnia) "Martin Nedić Bošnjak" and "fra Martin Nedić Bošnjačanin" (Martin Nedić the Bosnian).

Nedić attended school in Tolisa under fra Bono Benić Jr. He went on to gymnasium in Kraljeva Sutjeska and studied philosophy and theology in Subotica, Szolnok, Agrija, Gyöngyös and Vác.

As a student, he was drawn to the ideas of the Illyrian Movement which he soon adopted and incorporated into his writing. He wrote historical poems as well as commemorative, with eventful and sacramental contents. Together with Marijan Šunjić, Ivan Franjo Jukić, Jako Baltić, Blaž Josić and fra Grgo Martić, Nedić's cultural and political orientation was based on the para-political tradition of Bosna Srebrena as a Franciscan province and the only officially recognized entity under the influence of the Catholic Church in the Ottoman Balkans at the time. The group's national belonging was always and primarily defined as Bosnian, in such a way to include all ethnic and denominational groups inhabiting that space. Nedić also wrote memos from Bosnia, compiled reports about the state of Catholic schools in Bosnia, and collected and published historical materials and national treasures.

== Works ==
- Razgovor koga vile ilirkinje imadoše u pramalitje
- Pokret godine 1848. i 1849.
- Pjesma...Franji Josipu I (1852.)
- Regula et testamentum S.P. S. Francisci (1854.)
- Shematismus almae misionariae provinciae Bosnae Argentinae (1855.)
- Starine bosanske
- Kitica od devet u raznih zgodah ubranih cvjetova (1875.)
- Ratovanje slovinskoga naroda proti Turcima godine 1875. -1877. (1881.)
- Pjesma o ulazu cesarove vojske u Bosnu (1881.)
- Život fra Marijana Šunjića (1883.)
- Stanje redodržave Bosne Srebrene (1884.)
- Poraz baša a zavedenje nizama u Bosni (ep, 1844.)
- Razgovor vilah ilirkinjah u pramalitje godine 1841
- Glas redodržave Bosne Srebrene (ep)
- Pjesmotvorni spisi
- Zapamćenja (rukopisi)
