= Nedić =

Nedić (Cyrillic script: Недић) is a surname. It may refer to:

- Ljubomir Nedić (1858–1902), Serbian writer, philosopher, and critic
- Martin Nedić (1810–1895), Croatian poet
- Milan Nedić (1877–1946), Serbian general and politician
- Milutin Nedić (1882–1945), Yugoslav general
