= Stećak necropolis Ričina (Posušje) =

Medieval stećak necropolis, Posušje, Bosnia and Herzegovina

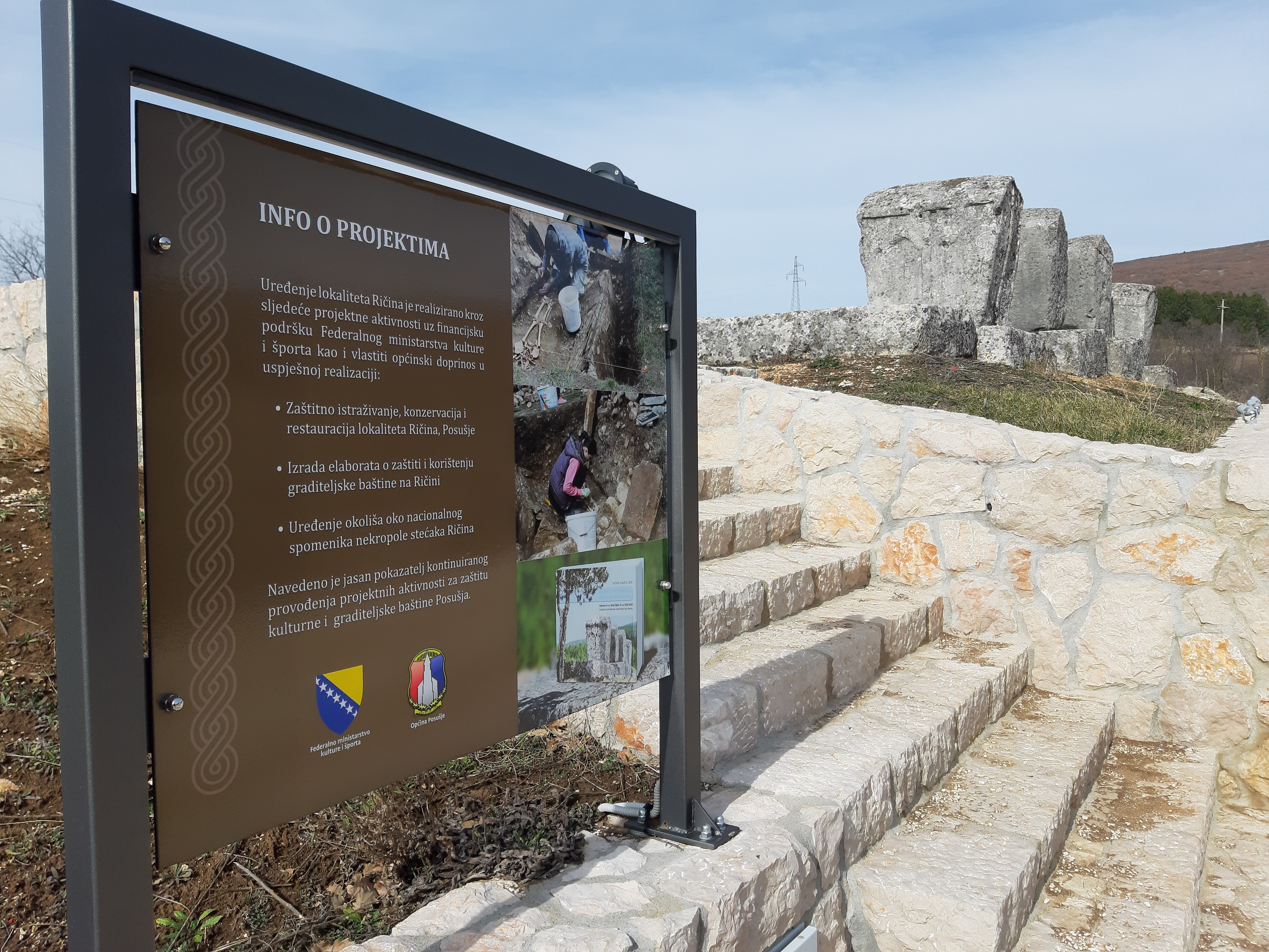
- Stećak necropolis Ričina with a visitor info panel by Commission to preserve monuments of Bosnia and Herzegovina

Details
- Established: 15th century
- Location: Posušje
- Country: Bosnia and Herzegovina
- Type: Medieval stećak necropolis
- Owned by: State
- No. of graves: 7
- Website: ?

KONS of Bosnia and Herzegovina
- Official name: Stećaks' necropolis near the Ričina stream
- Type: Category I cultural property
- Designated: 17 April 2019

The Stećak Necropolis Ričine is the medieval necropolis with stećak tombstones on the right bank of the Ričina stream, located in the village of Čitluk, on the main road from Posušje towards Tomislavgrad, municipality of Posušje, in Bosnia and Herzegovina. The necropolis is also designated a National Monument of Bosnia and Herzegovina by the Commission to preserve national monuments in 2019. The necropolis was first registered in 1988 as an archaeological site in the Archaeological Lexicon of Bosnia and Herzegovina, namely as a prehistoric tumulus on which there is a necropolis of stećaks, and between the stećaks, the remains of the walls of a building that is supposed to be a medieval church can be seen. Part of the stećak was destroyed during the construction of the road and the construction of the bridge.

On both sides of the Ričina stream, which dries up periodically, there are groups of stećaks, and between them a stone bridge from the 1930s. On the right side of the stream, there are two groups, the first is right next to the macadam road and has 7 tombstones (2 boxes and 5 gables), which stand out for their monumentality and decorations. These are monumental examples of tombstones, which are richly decorated with moon crescent and rosette motifs and have frames made of ordinary ribbon that extend over the middle of the sides. No inscriptions were observed. Considering the typological and stylistic characteristics of the monument, it is most likely that more distinguished people were buried there. The stećak necropolis is in relatively good condition. The stećaks were preserved and on that occasion two graves are examined, with human bones, some jewelry and small objects found in the burial grounds.

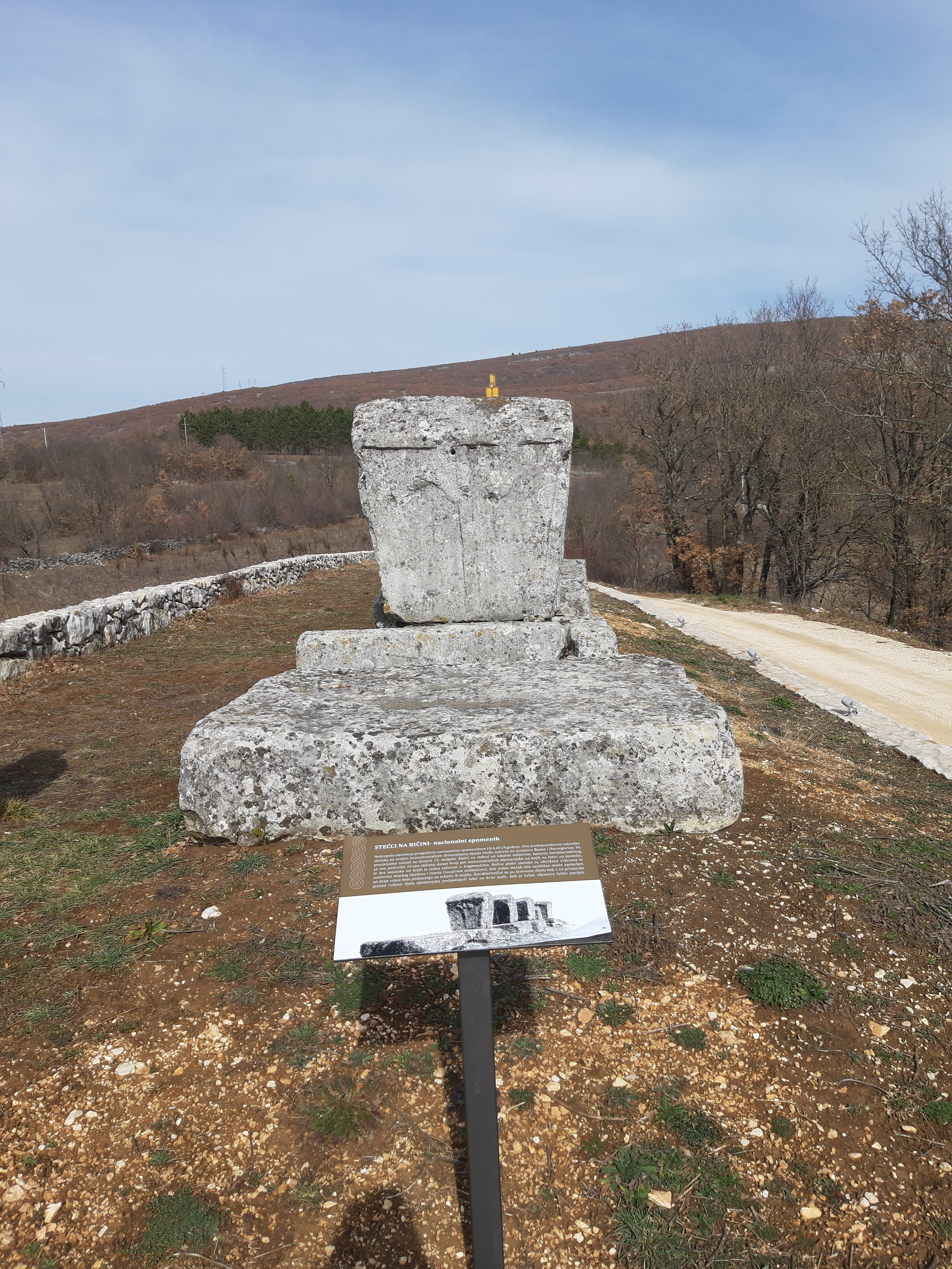
Stećci near the Ričina stream

The three stećaks, which are on the small ridge, are in the form of a plate, one of which is whole, and two are in fragments.

Near these two groups, there is a Roman Catholic cemetery where Šefik Bešlagić recorded 31 stećaks (29 chests and 2 sarcophagi), and now there are about a dozen of them. Most of them are in fragments, significantly damaged and sunken. Several stećaks were damaged during the construction of new tombs. When entering the cemetery by the road, there are three slab-shaped stećaks, one of which has sunk. Two stećaks were built into the fence wall of the cemetery, and three were placed outside it. Most of them are plate-shaped or undefined. Two sljemenjak tombstones (transl. gabled, also ridged or ridge-shaped tombstone), one of them with a pedestal, are the best preserved, and are located in the middle of the cemetery.

== Bibliography ==
- Šefik Bešlagić, Sarajevo: “Veselin Masleša“, 1982. STEĆCI – KULTURA I UMJETNOST
- Šefik Bešlagić, Sarajevo: Veselin Masleša, 1971. STEĆCI, KATALOŠKO-TOPOGRAFSKI PREGLED
- Marian Wenzel, Ukrasni motivi na stećcima, Sarajevo, 1965
