= Čitluk, Posušje =

Čitluk
- Village
- Location within Bosnia and Herzegovina
- Coordinates: 43°29′N 17°17′E
- Country: Bosnia and Herzegovina
- Entity: Federation of Bosnia and Herzegovina
- Canton: West Herzegovina Canton
- Municipality: Posušje

Area
  - Total: 10.38 km^{2} (4.01 sq mi)

Population (2013)
  - Total: 1,165
  - Density: 112.2/km^{2} (290.7/sq mi)
- Time zone: UTC+1 (CET)
  - Summer (DST): UTC+2 (CEST)

Čitluk is a village in the municipality of Posušje in West Herzegovina Canton, the Federation of Bosnia and Herzegovina, Bosnia and Herzegovina.

== Demographics ==
According to the 2013 census, its population was 1,165.

Ethnicity in 2013
| Ethnicity | Number | Percentage |
|---|---|---|
| Croats | 1,163 | 99.8% |
| other/undeclared | 2 | 0.2% |
| Total | 1,165 | 100% |

== Bibliography ==
- Ethnicity/National Affiliation, Religion and Mother Tongue (PDF). Sarajevo: Agency for Statistics of Bosnia and Herzegovina. 2019.
