= Bučići =

- Village
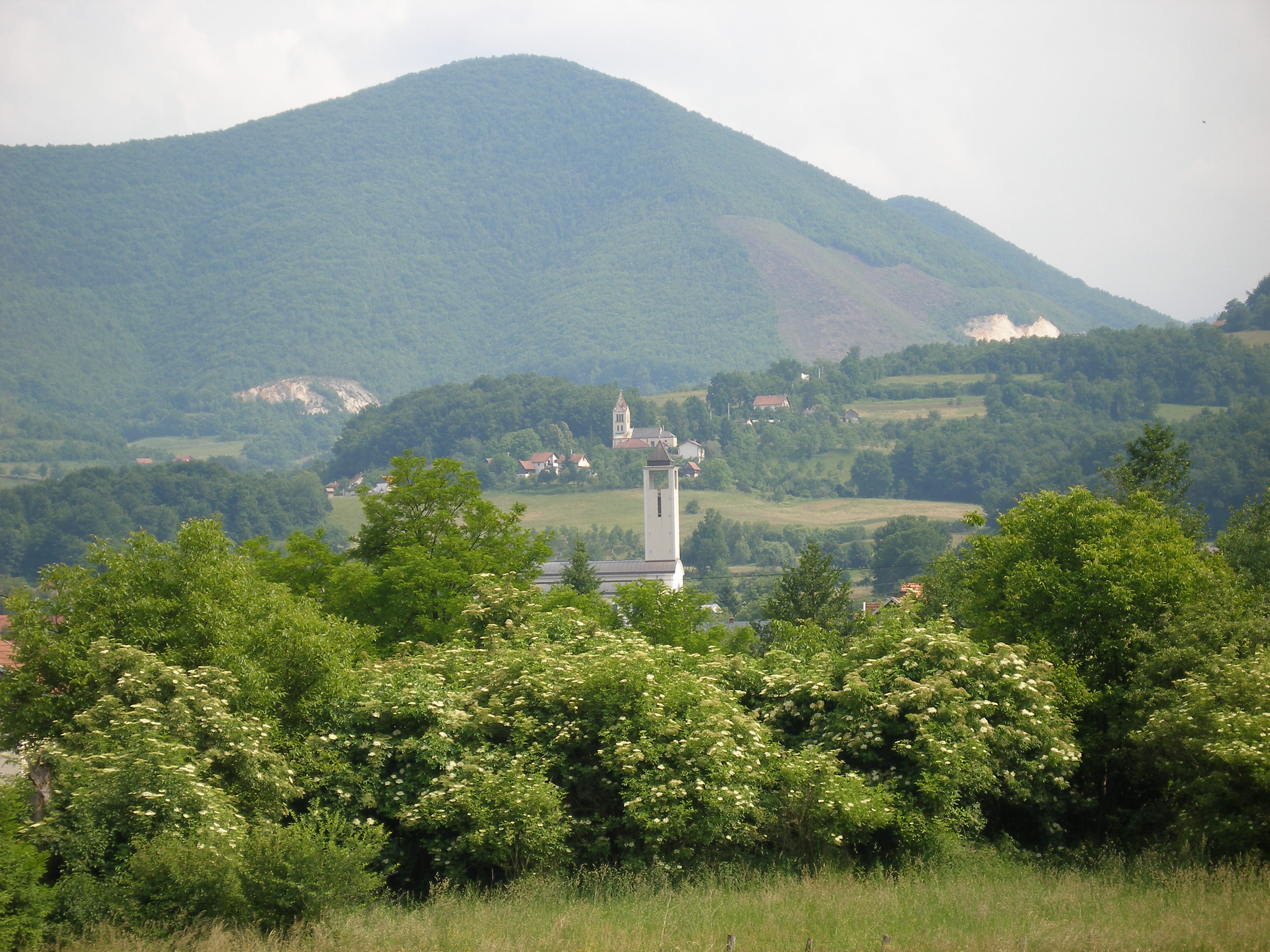
- A View of the new and the old Bučići church

- Location within Bosnia and Herzegovina
- Coordinates: 44°11′16″N 17°42′18″E
- Country: Bosnia and Herzegovina
- Entity: Federation of Bosnia and Herzegovina
- Canton: Central Bosnia
- Municipality: Novi Travnik

Area
  - Total: 0.48 sq mi (1.25 km^{2})

Population (2013)
  - Total: 437
  - Density: 905/sq mi (350/km^{2})
- Time zone: UTC+1 (CET)
  - Summer (DST): UTC+2 (CEST)

Bučići is a village in the vicinity of Novi Travnik, Bosnia and Herzegovina. Its population was around 1,600 in 2007, 99% of whom were Croat, with the remainder belonging to unspecified ethnic groups. Most of the residents are Roman Catholic.

== Demographics ==
According to the 2013 census, its population was 437.

Ethnicity in 2013
| Ethnicity | Number | Percentage |
|---|---|---|
| Croats | 434 | 99.3% |
| Serbs | 2 | 0.5% |
| other/undeclared | 1 | 0.2% |
| Total | 437 | 100% |

== Notable people from Bučići ==
- Marijan Šunjić
- Frano Zubić
