= Grgo Martić =

Bosnian friar and writer (1822 - 1905)

Fra Grgo Martić
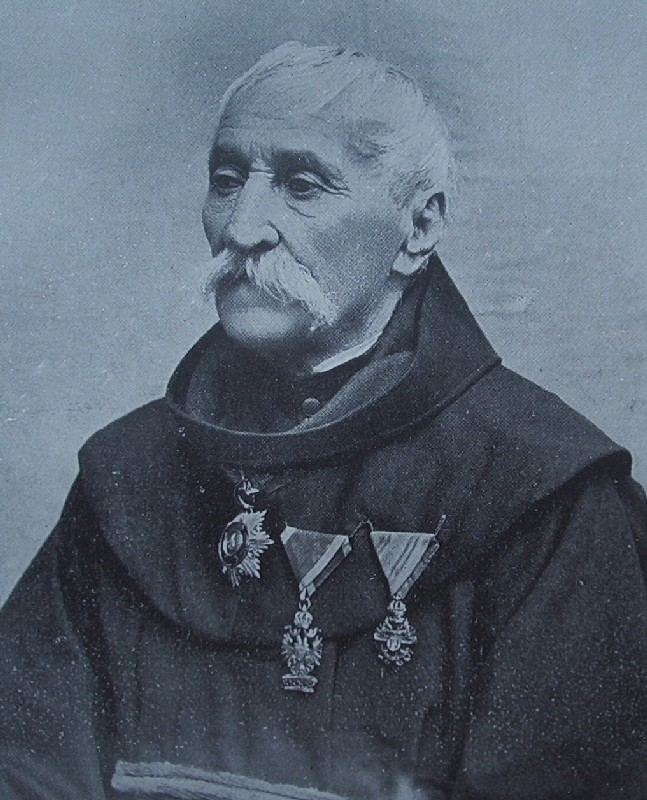

Personal life
- Born: Ljubomir Martić; 24 January 1822 Rastovača, Eyalet of Bosnia, Ottoman Empire (now Rastovača, Bosnia and Herzegovina)
- Died: 30 August 1905 (aged 83) Kreševo, Condominium of Bosnia and Herzegovina, Austria-Hungary (now Kreševo, Bosnia and Herzegovina)

Religious life
- Religion: Roman Catholic
- Order: Franciscan
- Ordination: 1845

Grgo Martić (24 January 1822 – 30 August 1905), also known as Grga or Mato Martić, was a Bosnian friar, writer, and translator in the Franciscan Province of Bosna Srebrena. During his lifetime, Martić earned a nickname Bosnian Homer.

== Biography ==
He was born as Ljubomir Martić in the village of Rastovača, near Posušje, in the Eyalet of Bosnia, then a part of the Ottoman Empire. He studied philosophy in Zagreb before completing his theology degree in Stolni Biograd (now Székesfehérvár, Hungary). He was ordained in 1845 in Travnik.

He served for three years in Kreševo and Osova.

From 1851 to 1878, he served as a parish priest in Sarajevo before settling at the Franciscan monastery St. Catharine in Kreševo. As a friar of the Franciscan Province of Bosna Srebrena, Martić served the majority of his life, and carried out most of his work while at the monastery.

In his youth, he was a supporter of Illyrian movement as a nationalist and romanticist, before switching to a more moderate view.

Martić worked as a writer and translator, translating works of Homer, Tolstoy, and Goethe into the peoples vernacular language (narodni jezik). At the time of the Austro-Hungarian occupation of Bosnia and Herzegovina, he was politically active on behalf of the Catholics of Bosnia and Herzegovina.

== Influences and legacy ==
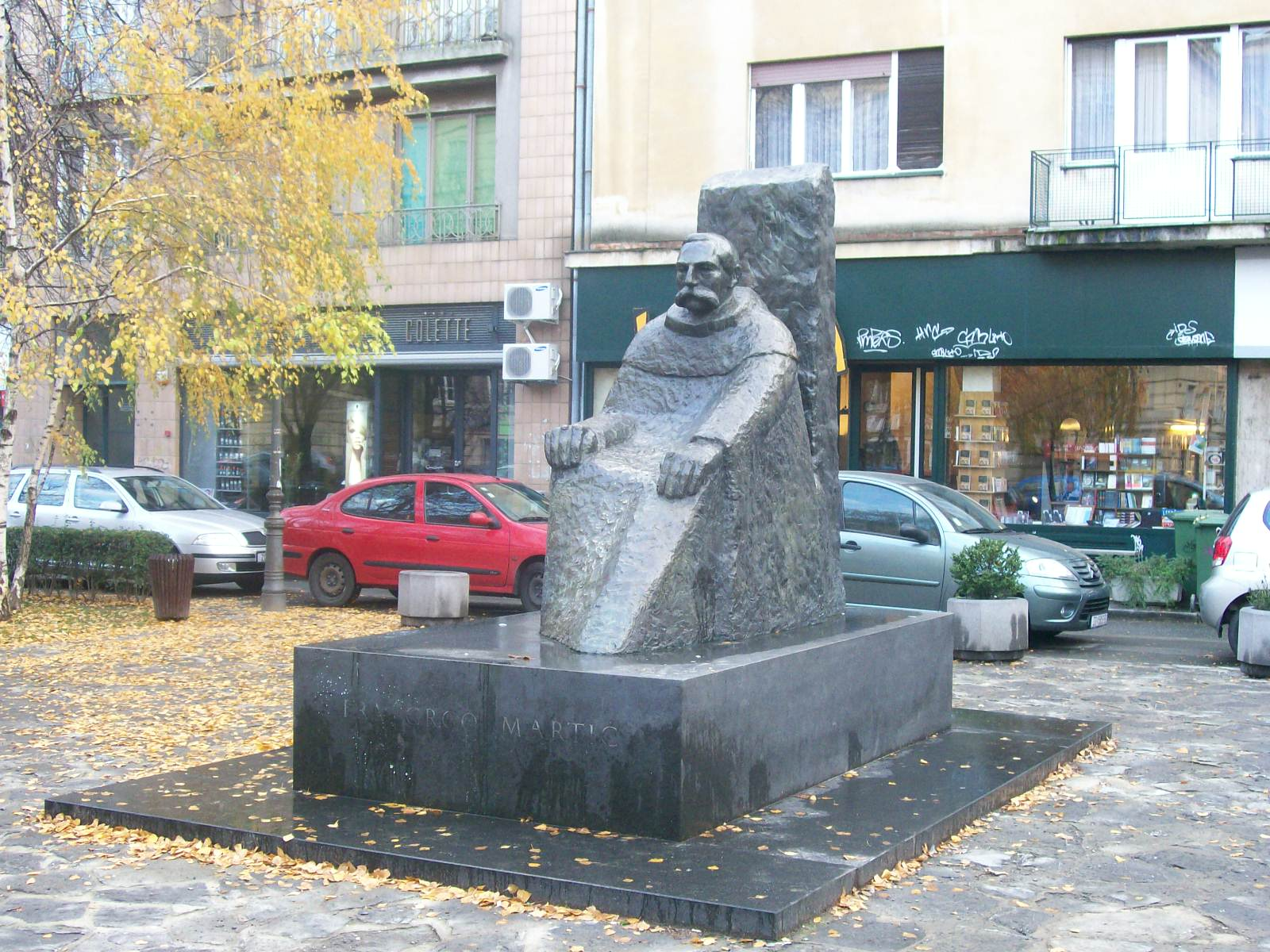
Monument in Zagreb

He opened a school in Kreševo in 1847 and a gymnasium in Sarajevo. His best-known literary work was Avengers (Serbo-Croatian: Osvetnici), an epic about the struggle against Ottoman rule. Martić made contributions to Albanian culture as well, influencing young Albanian writer Gjergj Fishta who attended Franciscan schools in Kreševo where he met Martić and Croatian writer Silvije Strahimir Kranjčević, who at that time also lived in Bosnia. Martić's work is included into both Bosnian-Herzegovinian and Croatian literary anthologies.

- His life has also been commemorated with a postage stamp from Bosnia and Herzegovina.
- Central place in Old Town of Sarajevo, in front of the Sarajevo Cathedral, bears the name of fra Grgo Martić.
- A monument in his honor is erected in front of a church in Posušje, while another is also erected in Zagreb. Also, two monuments were erected to Grgo Martić in Kreševo.
- A commemorative stone cross with a plaque stands in the village Rastovača noting his birthplace, his life and his work.

== Literary works ==
- Slavodobitnica svijetlomu gospodaru Omer-paši (epic poem, 1852)
- Narodne pjesme bosanske i hercegovačke (with Ivan Frano Jukić), I (1858)
- Osvetnici, I-III (ep, 1861/65.), IV (1878.), V (1881.), VI (1881.), VII (1883)
- Početni zemljopis za katoličke učionice u Bosni (epic poem, 1884)
- Narodne pjesme o boju na Kosovu godine 1389. (1886)
- Obrana Biograda godine 1456. (ep, 1887)
- Pjesnička djela fra Grge Martića, 1-7 (1888)
- Pjesnička djela fra Grge Martića, I (1893)
- Zapamćenja/1829–1878, po kazivanju autorovu zabilježio janko Koharić (1906.)
- Izabrani spisi (1956)
