= Frano Zubić =

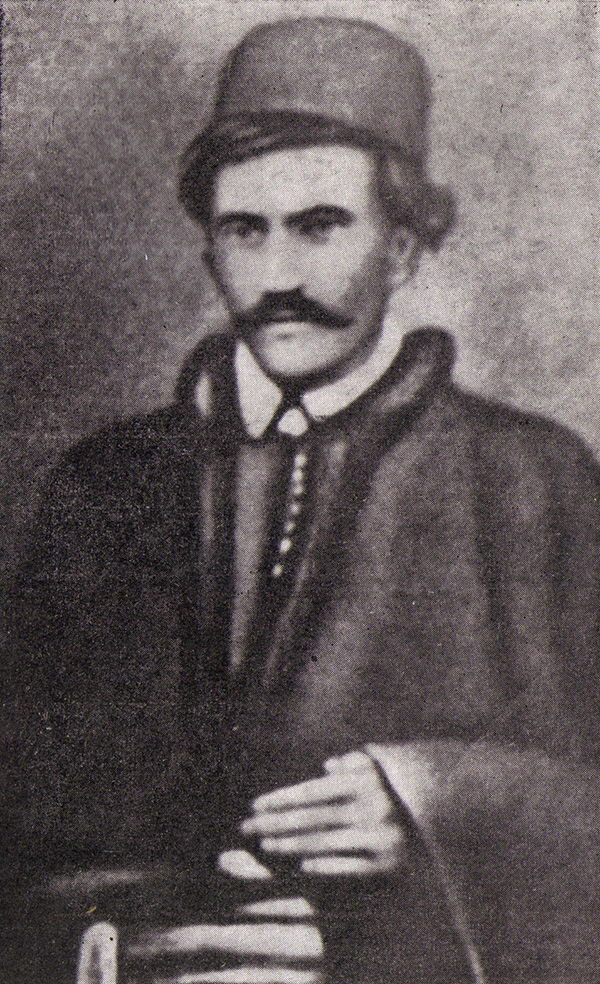
As parish priest of Turska Gradiška in 1855.

Frano Zubić (Travnik, 1822 – Bučići, 1871), a Bosnian Franciscan, who lived and worked in the Ottoman Bosnia in the 19th century.

== Life and work ==
He finished basic education in the Fojnica monastery of the Franciscan Province of Bosna Srebrena, entered the novitiate on November 4, 1839, took his first vows on the same day next year. After studying philosophy and theology for five years, he was ordained priest and became a parish vicar in the parish of Sokoline. There he was imprisoned by Turkish authorities and suffered a great deal.

He also served as parish vicar in the parishes of Ivanjska (near Banja Luka), Bosanska Gradiška, and Dolac. He also served as parish priest in Dobretići, where, together with the parish faithful, he built a church consecrated to St. Anthony of Padua. He was very beloved among people, not only Catholics but also Muslims and the Orthodox, for his humility, simplicity, and compassion for the common man.

During his ministry as the parish priest of Bučići, he encouraged his parishioners to build a church. He died of encephalitis in 1871, after laying the foundation stone for the new church at the age of 49. In memory of him, once a month, on the Tuesday that comes after a New Moon, a Mass is celebrated on the Komarda Cemetery in Bučići where he was buried. The people think of him as a saint, and often come to pray at his tomb.

== See also ==
- Bosna Srebrena
