= Marijan Šunjić (bishop) =

Bosnian Catholic Franciscan and bishop (1798–1860)

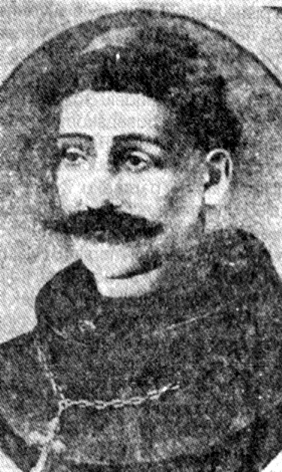
Bishop Marijan Šunjić

Marijan Šunjić (Croatian pronunciation: [mârijaːn ʃǔːɲitɕ]; 7 January 1798 – 28 September 1860) was a Bosnian Franciscan, Catholic bishop, Apostolic Vicar in Bosnia, writer, linguist; scientific, cultural and political worker.

== Life ==
Fr. Marijan Šunjić was born in the village of Bučići near Travnik, Ottoman Bosnia at the end of the 18th century. At baptism he was named Ivo (in Bosnian short for Ivan, i.e. John) by his parents. He learned the basics of literacy from them, and continued his education in the Franciscan monastery of Guča Gora and the Franciscan monastery in Fojnica. He spent his novitiate year in Fojnica (1813–1814), and then started his studies of philosophy and theology in Zagreb and Mohács (1814–1821). Afterwards he studied oriental languages (Arabic, Turkish, and Persian) in Zagreb and Vienna. He spent eight months with the renowned polyglot cardinal Mezzofanti in Bologna, where he deepened and expanded his knowledge of the languages. Šunjić hence became well known for his knowledge of numerous languages, including oriental ones. In addition to the above-mentioned languages, he also spoke Italian, German, French, Classical Greek and Latin, and quite a few Slavic languages. If we take into account his education, his broad views, scientific and cultural work, we can say with certainty that he was one of the most prominent figures in the history of the Franciscan Province of Bosna Srebrena, and not only in his lifetime.

When he returned to Bosnia, he was at first engaged in pastoral work as a parish vicar in Kupres and Mokronoge near Duvno (1831), afterwards in Orašje near Travnik (1832). In addition to pastoral work, he performed the function of Province secretary (1832), Provincial custodian (1835) and Provincial Minister (1845–1851). The last five years of his life he spent as bishop and the Apostolic Vicar in Bosnia (1855–1860).

He was twice imprisoned by the Ottoman authorities (in 1827 and 1834), because he fought for the rights of the Catholic people and his Franciscan Province. During the conflict with Bishop Rafo Barišić, in 1843 he was, along with many other prominent Franciscans, sentenced to be expelled to Italy, but that decision, due to changed circumstances, was never realized. During that long-lasting conflict, he travelled twice to Rome (in 1834 and 1840) and once to Constantinople (in 1846, together with some other friars), fighting for the rights of the Province. In 1851 he submitted a plea to the Austrian Emperor Francis Joseph I, urging him to take concrete action for the improvement of the hard situation Bosnian Catholics and Franciscans were in.

He was very active and successful in raising new churches and monasteries, as well as in opening public schools. He was the first one to suggest the idea of abstinent societies. In October 1854, Pope Pius IX named him the titular bishop of Panadena and Apostolic Vicar in Bosnia. He performed the duty until death.

Šunjić was considered a exemplary Franciscan, priest, and bishop, and known as an expert in classical, European, and oriental languages. In conversation with the Pope, bishops, priests, the Emperor, the Sultan, the Vizier, or ordinary people he was always elegant and dignified, mild and pleasant, simple and humble. Bishop Josip Juraj Strossmayer said that Šunjić "had been the greatest and most famous man Bosnia in recent times had".

He died in Vienna, on 28 September 1860. He was buried in the church of the Guča Gora Monastery. His written legacy was burned in 1945, together with the monastery, for whose construction he was largely responsible. The esteem, respect, and love toward Bishop Šunjić were once again expressed when people in great numbers attended the funeral. Entire Bosnia shed their tears for him. On his tombstone was inscribed that "he was the crown and pride of his brethren, and an everlasting glory of his entire folk".
