= Zavelim =

- Village
- Location within Bosnia and Herzegovina
- Coordinates: 43°33′N 17°7′E
- Country: Bosnia and Herzegovina
- Entity: Federation of Bosnia and Herzegovina
- Canton: West Herzegovina Canton
- Municipality: Posušje

Area
  - Total: 13.28 km^{2} (5.13 sq mi)

Population (2013)
  - Total: 208
  - Density: 15.7/km^{2} (40.6/sq mi)
- Time zone: UTC+1 (CET)
  - Summer (DST): UTC+2 (CEST)

Zavelim is a village in the municipality of Posušje in West Herzegovina Canton, the Federation of Bosnia and Herzegovina, Bosnia and Herzegovina.

== Demographics ==
According to the 2013 census, its population was 208.

Ethnicity in 2013
Ethnicity	Number	Percentage
Croats	205	98.6%
other/undeclared	3	1.4%
Total	208	100%

== Bibliography ==
- Ethnicity/National Affiliation, Religion and Mother Tongue (PDF). Sarajevo: Agency for Statistics of Bosnia and Herzegovina. 2019. Archived from the original (PDF) on 2020-07-25.
