= Vir, Posušje =

Vir
- Village
- Location within Bosnia and Herzegovina
- Coordinates: 43°31′17″N 17°12′47″E
- Country: Bosnia and Herzegovina
- Entity: Federation of Bosnia and Herzegovina
- Canton: West Herzegovina Canton
- Municipality: Posušje

Area
  - Total: 30.46 km^{2} (11.76 sq mi)

Population (2013)
  - Total: 1,626
  - Density: 53.38/km^{2} (138.3/sq mi)
- Time zone: UTC+1 (CET)
  - Summer (DST): UTC+2 (CEST)

Vir is a village in the municipality of Posušje in West Herzegovina Canton, the Federation of Bosnia and Herzegovina, Bosnia and Herzegovina. Until 1945, it was part of the Kotar of Tomislavgrad.

== History ==
It has a rich history, starting from the time of the younger (Neolithic) Stone Age and from its older means the existing remains of man in the Žukoška cave in the neighbouring village of Zagorje, from Roman times to the present day. Illyrian mounds, remains of Roman fortifications, Roman money, stećak tombstones, etc. were found in the area of Vir. In the whole of Herzegovina, Vir was the last to fall under Turkish rule until 1513. During World War I and II, many people from Vir died, and many took part in the last Homeland War.

== Population ==
Vir
godina popisa	2013.	1991.	1981.	1971.
Hrvati	1.621 (99,7%)	1.658 (98,98%)	1.741 (99,08%)	1.860 (99,35%)
Srbi	0	0	9 (0,51%)	5 (0,26%)
Muslimani	0	0	1 (0,05%)	3 (0,16%)
Jugoslaveni	0	0	5 (0,28%)	0
ostali i nepoznato	5 (0,3%)	17 (1,01%)	1 (0,05%)	4 (0,21%)
ukupno	1.626	1.675	1.757	1.872

According to the 2013 census, its population was 1,626.

== Bibliography ==
- Ethnicity/National Affiliation, Religion and Mother Tongue (PDF). Sarajevo: Agency for Statistics of Bosnia and Herzegovina. 2019. Archived from the original (PDF) on 2020-07-25.
