= Rastovača, Bosnia and Herzegovina =

Rastovača
- Village
- Location within Bosnia and Herzegovina
- Coordinates: 43°28′N 17°21′E
- Country: Bosnia and Herzegovina
- Entity: Federation of Bosnia and Herzegovina
- Canton: West Herzegovina Canton
- Municipality: Posušje

Area
  - Total: 18.91 km^{2} (7.30 sq mi)

Population (2013)
  - Total: 2,605
  - Density: 137.8/km^{2} (356.8/sq mi)
- Time zone: UTC+1 (CET)
  - Summer (DST): UTC+2 (CEST)

Rastovača is a village in the municipality of Posušje in West Herzegovina Canton, the Federation of Bosnia and Herzegovina, Bosnia and Herzegovina.

== Demographics ==
According to the 2013 census, its population was 2,605.

Ethnicity in 2013
Ethnicity	Number	Percentage
Croats	2,600	99.8%
other/undeclared	5	0.2%
Total	2,605	100%

== Bibliography ==
- Ethnicity/National Affiliation, Religion and Mother Tongue (PDF). Sarajevo: Agency for Statistics of Bosnia and Herzegovina. 2019.
