= Tomislavgrad =

Tomislavgrad Duvno
- Town
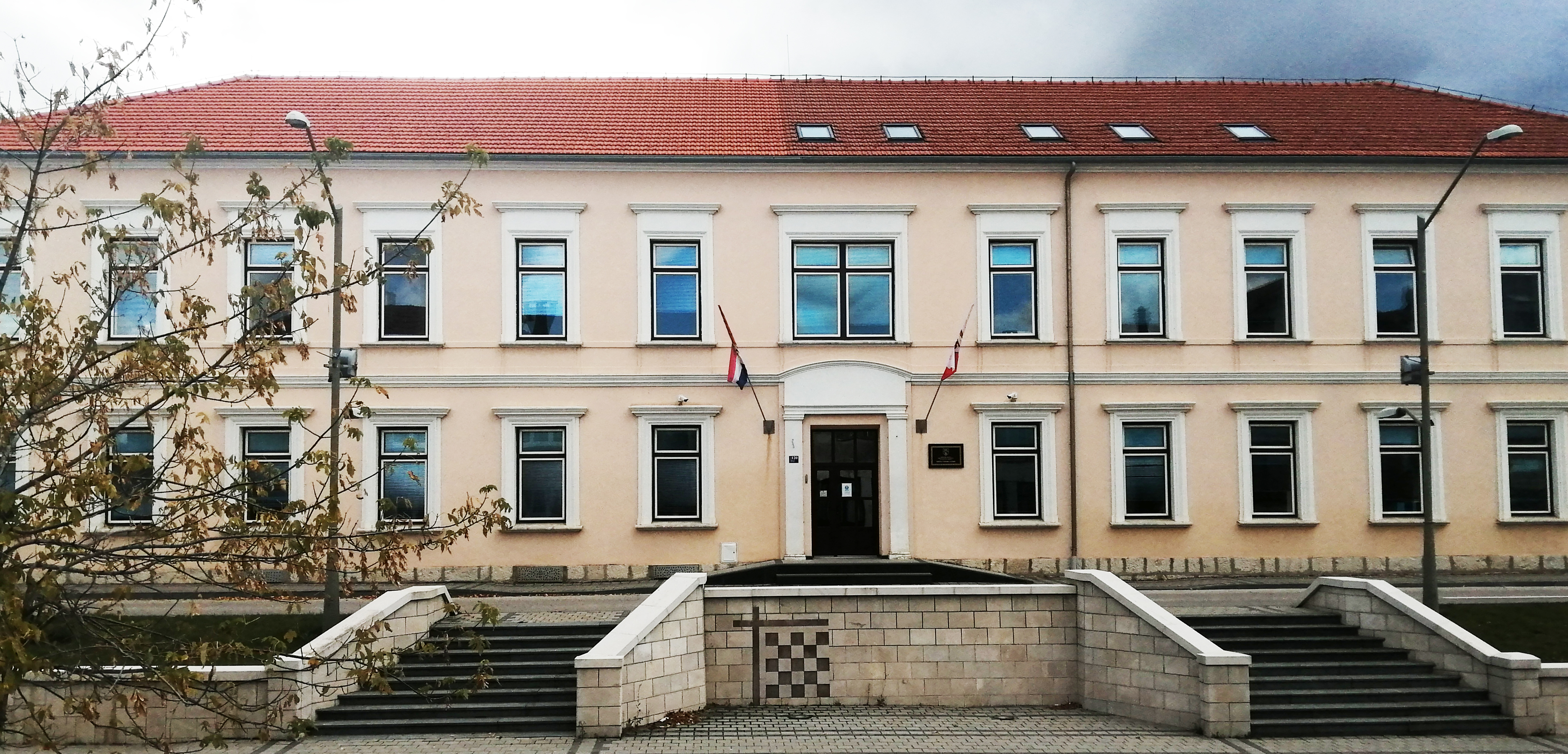
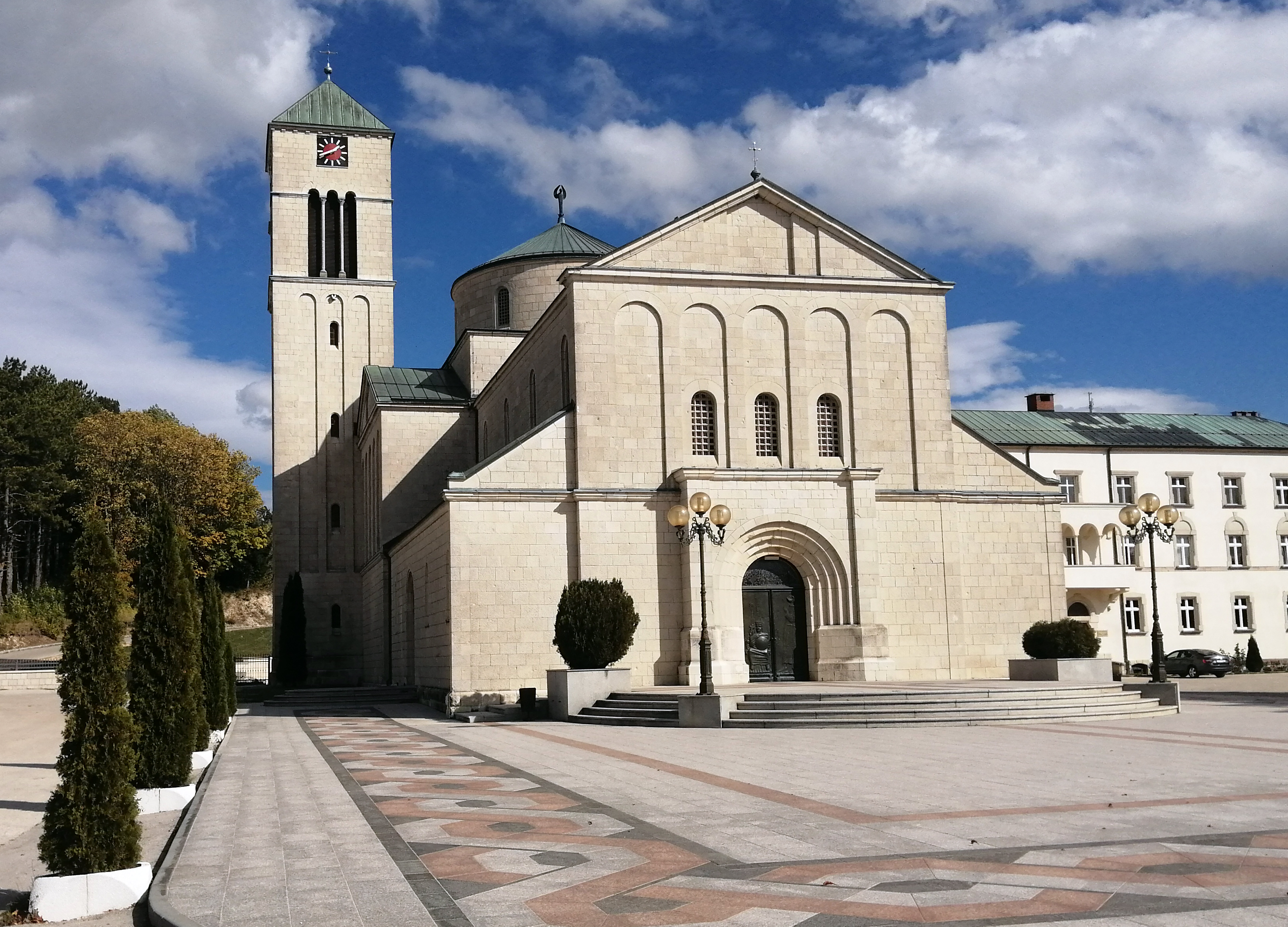
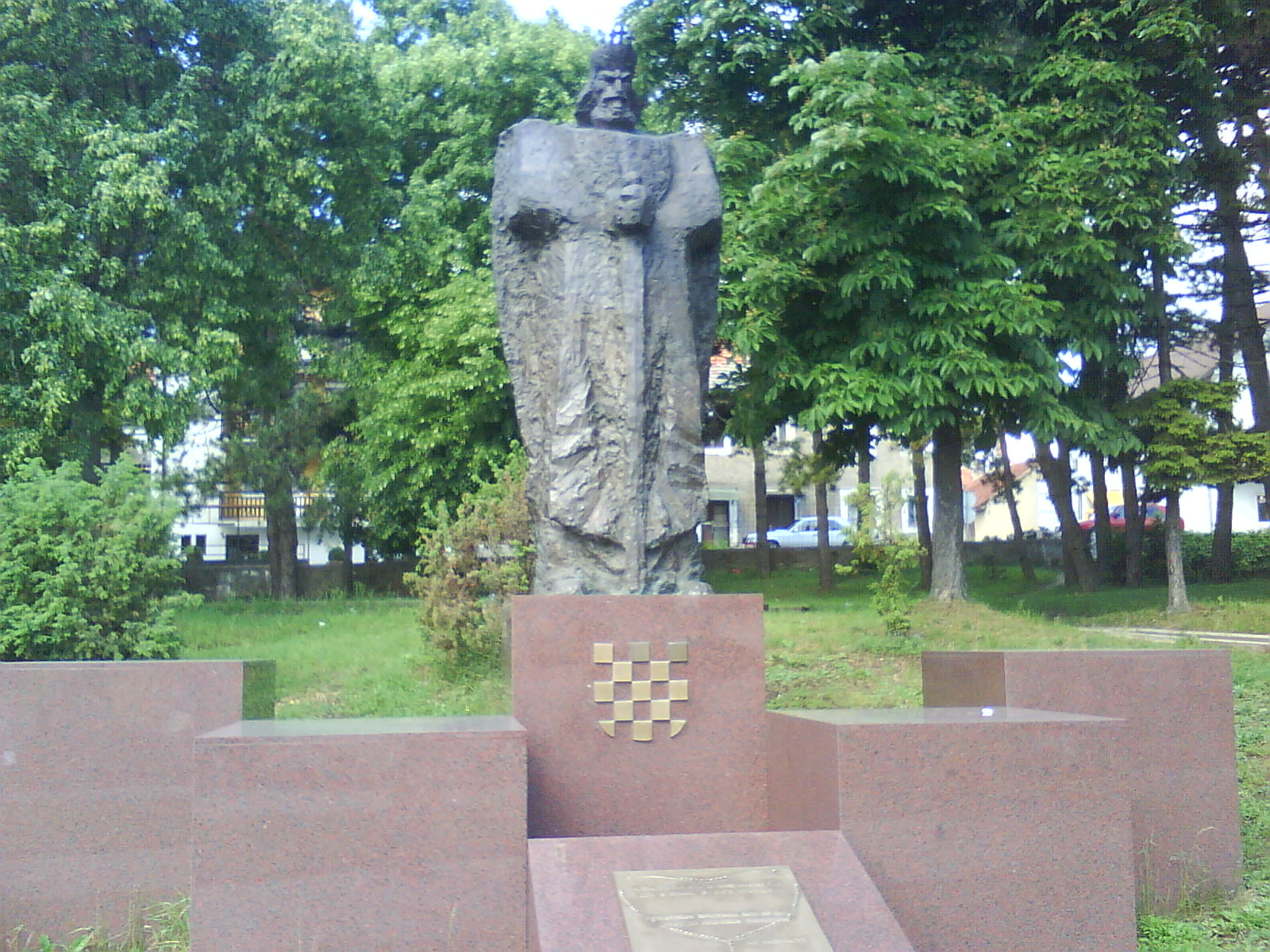
- Tomislavgrad

- Location within Bosnia and Herzegovina
- Coordinates: 43°43′N 17°14′E
- Country: Bosnia and Herzegovina
- Entity: Federation of Bosnia and Herzegovina
- Canton: Canton 10
- Municipality: Tomislavgrad
- Named for: Tomislav of Croatia

Government
  - Municipal mayor: Ivan Buntić (HNP)

Population (2013)
  - Total: 5,587
- Time zone: UTC+1 (CET)
  - Summer (DST): UTC+2
- Postal code: 80240
- Area code: +387 34

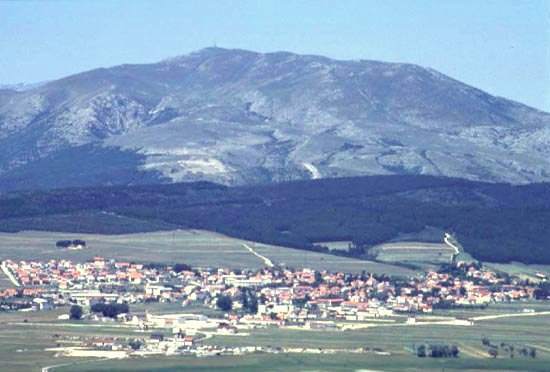
Tomislavgrad

Tomislavgrad (Serbian Cyrillic: Томиславград, pronounced [tǒmislaʋgrâːd]), also known by its former name Duvno (Cyrillic: Дувно, pronounced [dǔːʋno]), is a town and the seat of the Municipality of Tomislavgrad in Canton 10 of the Federation of Bosnia and Herzegovina, an entity of Bosnia and Herzegovina. As of 2013, it has a population of 5,587 inhabitants.

In the Roman times, it was known as Delminium. During the Middle Ages when it was part of Croatia and Bosnia, the town was known as Županjac. This name remained until 1928 when it was changed to Tomislavgrad. In 1946, communist authorities changed the name again to Duvno, and in 1990, the name was returned to Tomislavgrad.

== Name ==
The town name means "Tomislav town". The name was changed from Županjac to Tomislavgrad in 1928 by King Alexander I of Yugoslavia in tribute to his newborn son Prince Tomislav, and also Tomislav of Croatia, the first king of the Kingdom of Croatia, who was allegedly crowned in the area. The name was changed to Duvno after World War II by Yugoslav communist authorities. In 1990 the name was restored to Tomislavgrad. Still, among inhabitants of Bosnia and Herzegovina, the residents are often referred to as Duvnjaci (Croatian for 'Duvniaks') and the town is often called Duvno. Also, the town is sometimes referred to simply as "Tomislav". The Catholic diocese in that area is still called Mostar-Duvno. During the Roman Empire the town was called Delminium, from which the name Duvno stems from, and during the medieval period in the Kingdom of Croatia and Kingdom of Bosnia it was called Županjac. Under the Ottoman Empire, it was called Županj-potok; and under Austria-Hungary, Županjac again.

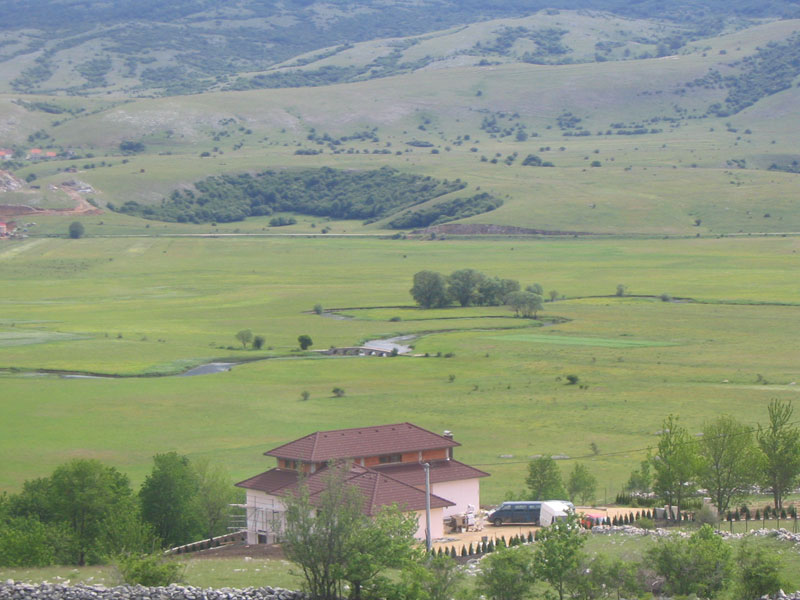
The Duvno field

== Location ==
Tomislavgrad is 38 kilometres (24 mi) from the canton seat Livno, 88 kilometres (55 mi) from Mostar, and 162 kilometres (101 mi) from Sarajevo.

== Demographics ==
Ethnic composition
| | 2013 | 1991 | 1981 | 1971 | 1961 |
| Total | 5,760 (100,0%) | 5,012 (100,0%) | 4,231 (100,0%) | 3,265 (100,0%) | 1,986 (100,0%) |
| Croats | 4,575 (81,89%) | 3,164 (63,13%) | 2,528 (59,75%) | 1,809 (55,41%) | 1,032 (51,96%) |
| Muslims/Bosniaks | 955 (17,09%) | 1,472 (29,37%) | 1,248 (29,50%) | 1,167 (35,74%) | 637 (32,07%) |
| Serbs | 16 (0,29%) | 219 (4,37%) | 214 (5,06%) | 241 (7,38%) | 246 (12,39%) |
| Others | 11 (0,197%) | | 25 (0,591%) | 4 (0,123%) | 4 (0,201%) |

== History ==
=== Ancient times ===
==== Illyrian time ====
The area of Tomislavgrad has been inhabited by Illyrian tribe of Dalmatae and Delminium was a town established by them near present-day Tomislavgrad. The area of Tomislavgrad has been populated from 4000 BC – 2400 BC, even before the Illyrians arrived, and from that time only polished stone axes remained as proof that someone was there.

As Romans conquered the territory of the Illyrian tribe Ardiaei, so, Delmataes and their tribal union was the last bastion of Illyrian freedom. The Dalmatae attacked Roman wards near Neretva, Greek merchant towns, and the Roman-friendly Illyrian tribe Daors. The Illyrians upgraded their settlements into strong forts and surrounded their capital with wreaths of smaller forts. It is assumed that, during that time, 5,000 Dalmatae lived in Delminium.

In 167 BC Illyrian forts could not stop Roman legions and Rome conquered the entire Adriatic coast south of Neretva; the state of the Ardieaei was also destroyed. The first conflict between the Dalmatae and Rome started in 156 BC. The consuls Gaius Marcius Figulus, then Publius Cornelius Scipio Nasica Corculum conquered and destroyed Delminium; the latter received a triumph in Rome for this victory. Reports of writers during that time say that Delminium was a "large city", almost inaccessible and impregnable. Romans shot lighted arrows at wooden houses, which then burned the city. After various rebellions led by Dalmatae and three wars with Rome, their land was lastly conquered for good in 9 AD.

==== Roman time ====
After the Roman conquest of Delminium, they started building roads and bridges. Roads that led to the mainland of the Balkans from the Adriatic coast in Salona (Solin) and Narona (Vid near Metković) crossed in Delminium (Tomislavgrad). Remains of those and other Roman roads are still in existence. Romans introduced their culture, language, legislation, and religion. For the next 400 years, Tomislavgrad was in peace.

After the Romans defeated Dalmatae, Delminium was almost abandoned. There was also, for some period, a military crew of Romans stationed there to keep Illyrians under control. Romans started to rebuild Delminium in 18 and 19 AD in the time of emperor Tiberius. During that time the centre of the city was built, a Roman forum. This forum was built on possession of present-day Nikola Tavelić basilica.

In 1896 Fra Anđeo Nuć discovered various sculptures of Roman pagan deities, fragments of pagan sarcophagi, and fragments of columns of medieval Christian churches. Of all those discoveries, the most prominent are two votive monuments and altars dedicated to goddess Diana, one altar dedicated to native Illyrian god Armatus and one votive plate dedicated to goddess Libera. Later, a relief of the goddess Diana was also found and one relief of Diana and Silvanus together. Also, new pagan altars, fragments of sarcophagi, clay pottery, parts of columns, and various other findings from the Roman and early medieval ages were found. This led to the conclusion that on the place of the present-day Catholic graveyard "Karaula" (which was previously an Ottoman military border post and guardhouse) was a Roman and Illyrian pagan sanctuary and graveyard.

=== Ottoman Empire ===
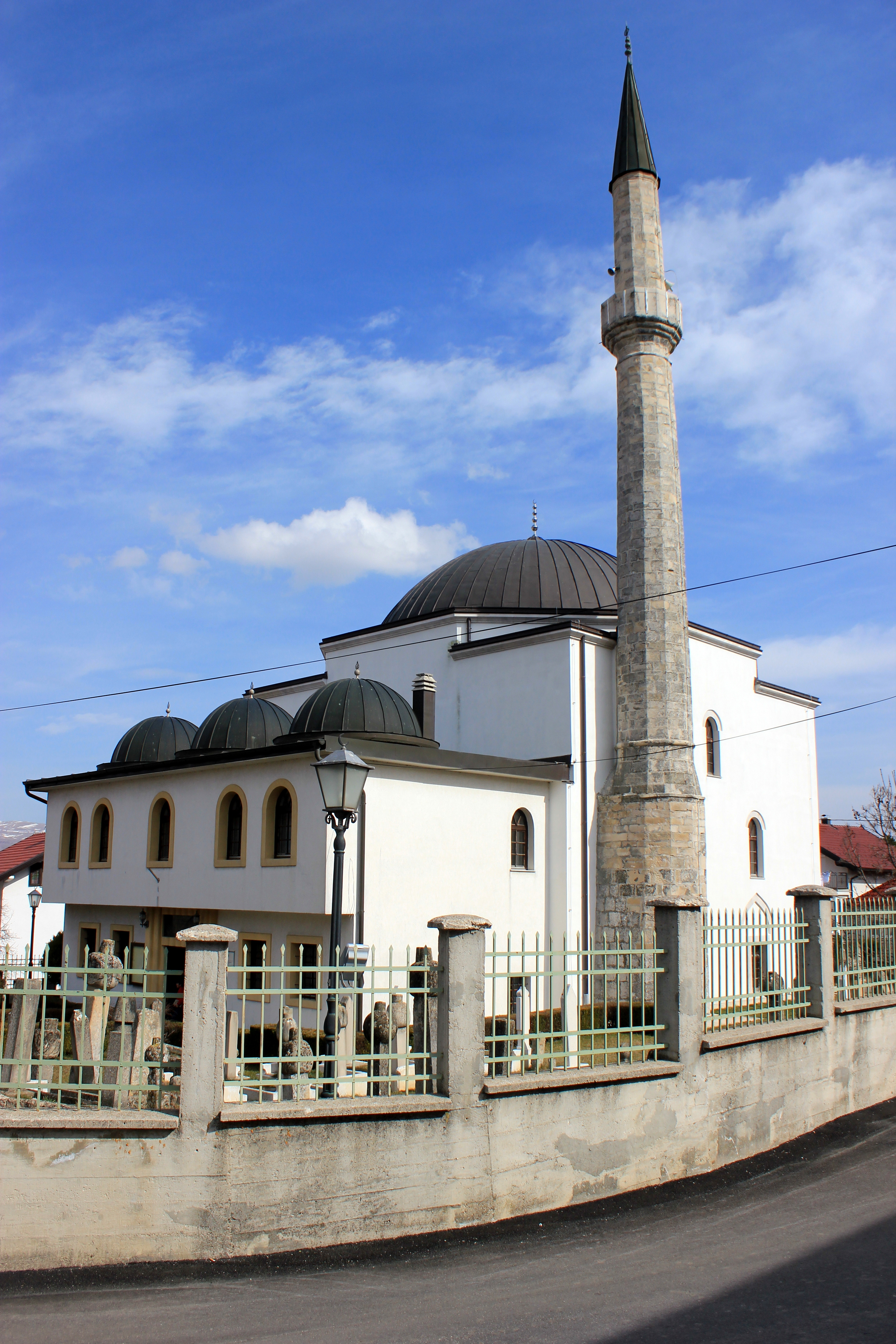
Džudža Džafer Mosque in Tomislavgrad

In the middle 16th century, the Ottomans founded a qasaba Županj-Potok. In 1576 Županj-Potok or Duvno became part of the Kadiluk of Imotski, and it became a kadiluk on its own before 1633. In the second half of the 17th century, Županj-Potok became a part of the Sanjak of Klis, however, it was soon returned to the Herzegovinian Sanjak.

On 8 May 1711, Županj-Potok became a captaincy. The seat of captaincy was Županj-Potok. The Captaincy of Duvno was located between the Captaincy of Livno at its north and the Captaincy of Ljubuški at its south; on its west was the Ottoman-Venetian border. Hasan Agha was named the first captain. In 1723, the Ottomans constructed a fort in Županj-Potok named it Sedidžedid (the new wall), and named the captaincy after it.

The population of Županj-Potok suffered heavily during the plagues of 1772, 1773, 1814, and 1815.

Hamdija Kreševljaković mentions a borough named Duvno at the end of the 17th century and also states that this borough became a kaza in the first years of the 18th century. In the middle of the 17th century Evliya Çelebi, a famous Turkish travel writer stated that Duvno "looks like a paradise garden, it is part of the Sanjak of Klis and has four hundred houses and one imposing mosque, many masjids, one inn, one hamam, and ten shops." Duvno remained under Ottoman rule until 1878 when Austria-Hungary occupied Bosnia and Herzegovina after the Berlin Congress.

=== Austria-Hungary ===
During the Austro-Hungarian rule in Bosnia and Herzegovina, Tomislavgrad was known as Županjac. It was a seat of the Kotar of Županjac, which didn't include the region of Šujica, but it encompassed the villages of Vir, Zavelim and Zagorje in the present-day Municipality of Posušje.

=== Kingdom of Yugoslavia ===
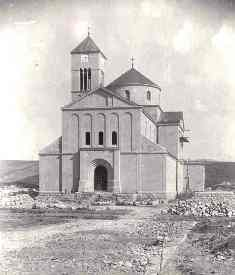
Nikola Tavelić basilica in the 1920s, when it was called Saint Cyril and Saint Methodius basilica

On 5 October 1918, the Croat, Slovene and Serb representatives in Austria-Hungary established the Nacional Council of the State of Slovenes, Croats and Serbs. The State of Slovenes, Croats and Serbs was united with the Kingdom of Serbia and the Kingdom of Montenegro on 1 December 1918 and formed the new state – Kingdom of Serbs, Croats and Slovenes. Županjac served as a seat of the Srez of Županjac, which was divided into four municipalities, Grabovica, Vir, Županjac, and Brišnik-Oplećani, the latter existing from 1937 to 1940 when it was abolished and incorporated into the Municipality of Županjac.

The provincial of the Herzegovinian Franciscans, David Nevistić, himself from Županjac, agitated for the Croatian People's Party (HPS), an anti-Yugoslav political party and called the priests to support it, while the local parish priest Mijo Čuić, also a Franciscan, opposed him and instead supported a non-ideological Croatian Farmers' Party (HTS). The HPS tried to establish its branches in the Srez of Županjac and agitated in its villages, Vir, Vinica, Grabovica, Roško Polje, Bukovica, Šujica (at the time part of the Srez of Livno) and the town of Županjac itself. The temporary president of the Srez of Županjac Luka Savić forbade them from organizing political meetings. According to the new law, the Srez of Županjac became a part of the electoral unit of the Okrug of Travnik. During the Constitutional Assembly election held on 28 November 1920, although the Srez of Županjac had 4,675 eligible voters, the HPS won only 194 votes. On the other hand, the HTS won 3,726 votes.

Several Croatian parties, including the Croatian Republican Peasant Party of Stjepan Radić and the HTS, formed a coalition Croatian Bloc, headed by Radić. The HTS held a political meeting in Županjac, while the speaker was a Franciscan from Livno, Jako Pašalić. Pašalić visited Županjac often for political reasons. However, the efforts were counter-productive as the local populace didn't support their politics being led by the Franciscans. In the 1923 parliamentary election, the HTS candidate won only 31 votes, while the HPS won 68 votes. The HRSS won 3,847 votes.

The next parliamentary election was held on 8 February 1925. The HRSS was once again the dominant party in the Srez of Županjac, winning 3,938 votes out of 4,737. The HPS won only 23 votes. Radić soon recognised the Vidovdan Constitution and the Karađorđević dynasty. This cost him some support from the Croat populace, however, he was still the favourite politician in the Srez of Županjac. In the autumn of 1926, he arrived in the Srez of Županjac and was first greeted in Šujica by some 2,000 people. Before entering the town of Županjac, he was greeted by the parish priest Šimun Ančić. The next day he held a public meeting which was attended by some 10,000 people.

In 1928, King Alexander had a third son and named him Tomislav after Tomislav of Croatia, to appease the Croats. At the beginning of February 1928, a delegation was sent from Županjac headed by Šimun Ančić who handed Alexander the resolution in which the population of the Srez of Županjac asked him to change the name of the srez to Tomislavgrad, in honour of his son and Tomislav of Croatia. Not long after, Alexander granted them their petition but dropped Tomislav of Croatia from his decree.

Political failure enabled Čuić to engage in cultural work. On 8 July 1924, with the help of the Brethren of the Croatian Dragon, he laid the foundation for the Catholic basilica. The architect was Stjepan Podhorsky. By 1926, the construction was still far from over, so the Central Committee of the People of Duvno was established in Zagreb, led by an industrialist Milan Prpić, to collect the funds for the construction of the basilica. The exterior was finished in 1932. On Podhorsky's initiative, the Club of the Cyril-Methodian Masons was established in Zagreb, which served as a branch of the Brethren of the Croatan Dragon. The purpose of the club was to collect the funds for the construction of the basilica. In the autumn of 1929, the Srez of Županjac was incorporated into the Littoral Banovina, at the time headed by Ivo Tartaglia. Tartaglia was unsympathetic to the basilica project. Although the construction of the basilica wasn't finished, it was consecrated on 29 September 1940, while the ceremony was attended by some 8,000 people. The consecrator was the Bishop of Mostar-Duvno Alojzije Mišić and was assisted by a Franciscan, Krešimir Pandžić.

In 1937, the Municipality of Brišnik-Oplećani was extracted from the Municipality of Tomislavgrad, so that the Yugoslav Radical Union (JRZ) could remain in power in the Srez of Tomislavgrad. After this decision, the Municipality of Tomislavgrad included only the town of Tomislavgrad, while the rest of the territory was incorporated into the newly established Municipality of Brišnik-Oplećani. After the Srez of Tomislavgrad became a part of the Banovina of Croatia in 1939, the Municipality of Brišnik-Oplećani was abolished in 1940 and incorporated into the Municipality of Tomislavgrad.

=== Independent State of Croatia ===
After the collapse of the Kingdom of Yugoslavia and the establishment of the German-Italian puppet the Independent State of Croatia (NDH) on 10 April 1941. The NDH was separated by the demarcation line, one zone controlled by the Italians and the other by the Germans. Tomislavgrad fell under the Italian demarcation zone.

The NDH was administratively divided into 22 grand counties. The Kotar of Tomislavgrad was part of the Grand County of Pliva-Rama. The Kotar of Tomislavgrad was further subdivided into several municipalities, including the urban centre – the Municipality of Tomislavgrad.

Šime Bančić from Split became the first district president. However, due to his opposition to the Ustaše government, he was quickly moved to Livno. Bančić was succeeded by Tomo Maleš from Sinj, who continued the policy of his predecessor. He was soon recalled to Zagreb and then sent to Sarajevo, where he was arrested and killed. In the summer of 1941, Tomislavgrad gained the third district president – Tripalo.

Alongside the civil authorities, the Ustaše established their authority. The head of the Ustaše for the District of Tomislavgrad was logornik Jozo Brstilo, while the Ustaše organisation on the municipality level was headed by tabornik Bajro Tanović, originally from Gacko. The head of the police in Tomislavgrad was Josip Antić from Ključ. The Italian occupation government disallowed their presence in Tomislavgrad, until the signing of the Treaty of Rome on 18 May 1941, when they were allowed to take control over Tomislavgrad.

Immediately after the establishment of the NDH, the Ustaše in Tomislavgrad, led by Brstilo and Tanović, organised the persecution of local Serbs. The Communist Party of Yugoslavia's (KPJ) local committee in Livno was in charge of the District of Tomislavgrad, and organised the first Partisan units. Fearing of the spread of the rebellion, the Italians once again occupied Tomislavgrad in September 1941 and took control of the political and military affairs until June 1942. While the NDH civil authorities remained active, the Ustaše organisation was expelled from Tomislavgrad.

When the German and Italian Zones of Influence were revised on 24 June 1942, Tomislavgrad fell in Zone II, administered civilly by Croatia but militarily by Italy.

During the second Italian occupation, the communists managed to expand the number of partisans and their activities. The KPJ Livno was part of the Communist Party of Croatia's branch for the region of Dalmatia. Thus, the Partisans of Tomislavgrad were directly subordinated to the communist leadership from Croatia. The territory of the Kotar of Tomislavgrad was part of the Fourth Operational Zone of Croatia.

== Contemporary ==
=== Name change ===
Referendum on changing the name of the town of Duvno to Tomislavgrad and the municipality of Duvno to the municipality of Tomislavgrad
- 12 August 1990
- Do you support changing the name of the town of Duvno to Tomislavgrad and the municipality of Duvno to the municipality of Tomislavgrad?
- Outcome: Passed

Results
| Choice | Votes | % |
|---|---|---|
| For | 17,105 | 98.91% |
| Against | 188 | 1.09% |
| Valid votes | 17,293 | 99.67% |
| Invalid or blank votes | 57 | 0.33% |
| Total votes | 17,350 | 100.00% |
| Registered voters/turnout | 21,098 | 82.24% |

During the January 1990 public gatherings, the citizens demanded that the name of the town and municipality be changed back to Tomislavgrad, a name used between 1928 and 1946. For this reason, the Municipal Committee of the Socialist Union of Working People of Duvno (OK SSRN) asked the Municipal Assembly of Duvno to start a referendum on the matter. However, the Assembly refused to proceed further on regarding the name change, requesting valid reasons for such a move. In April 1990, an anonymous initiator started a petition to change the name of the town to Tomislavgrad. The petition managed to collect 6,000 signatures. The Executive Council of the Assembly proposed the voting on the petition, and on 9 July 1990, the Assembly decided to hold a referendum, with 52 votes in favour and 6 against. The referendum was held on 12 August 1990, with 98.91% of the voters supporting the name change. The voting passed peacefully without incidents. Due to the summer pause, the Municipal Assembly met again only on 1 October 1990 and adopted the report of the electoral commission on the referendum and sent a proposal to the Assembly of the SR Bosnia and Herzegovina to enact the change of name for the town and the municipality of Duvno. On 30 October 1990, the Assembly of the SR BiH adopted the law on the name change. The traffic signs were changed in December 1990.

== Economy ==
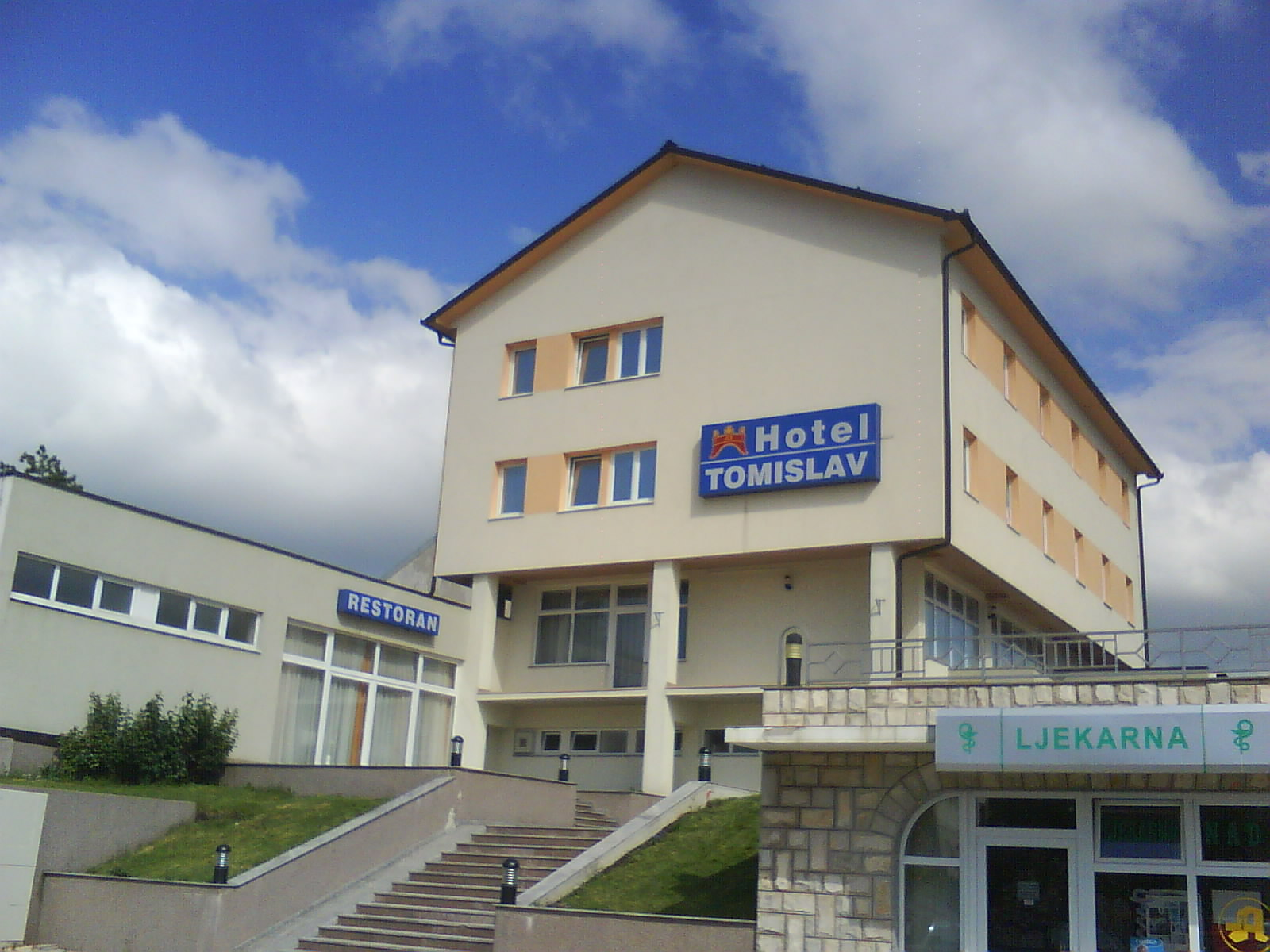
Hotel Tomislav in Tomislavgrad

Tomislavgrad today is in a very hard economic situation. Many people emigrated from it in the 1960s and 1970s, but mostly during war in the 1990s. Most went to Croatia (mostly Zagreb), Western Europe (mostly Germany), and Australia. Among the companies active in the city there are a couple big companies as "Kapis Tomislavgrad", "Kamensko d.o.o." and some transport and construction companies. The town is also home to the "Tomislav Farmer's Market" (Pijaca Tomislavgrad). There's also a Konzum market as well as multiple stores belonging to the retailer Baković as well as a construction supplier by the name of Brodomerkur.

== Monuments and culture ==
In downtown Tomislavgrad, there is a huge monument in tribute of King Tomislav made by sculptor Vinko Bagarić from Zagreb and installed in the 1990s after the Bosnian War.

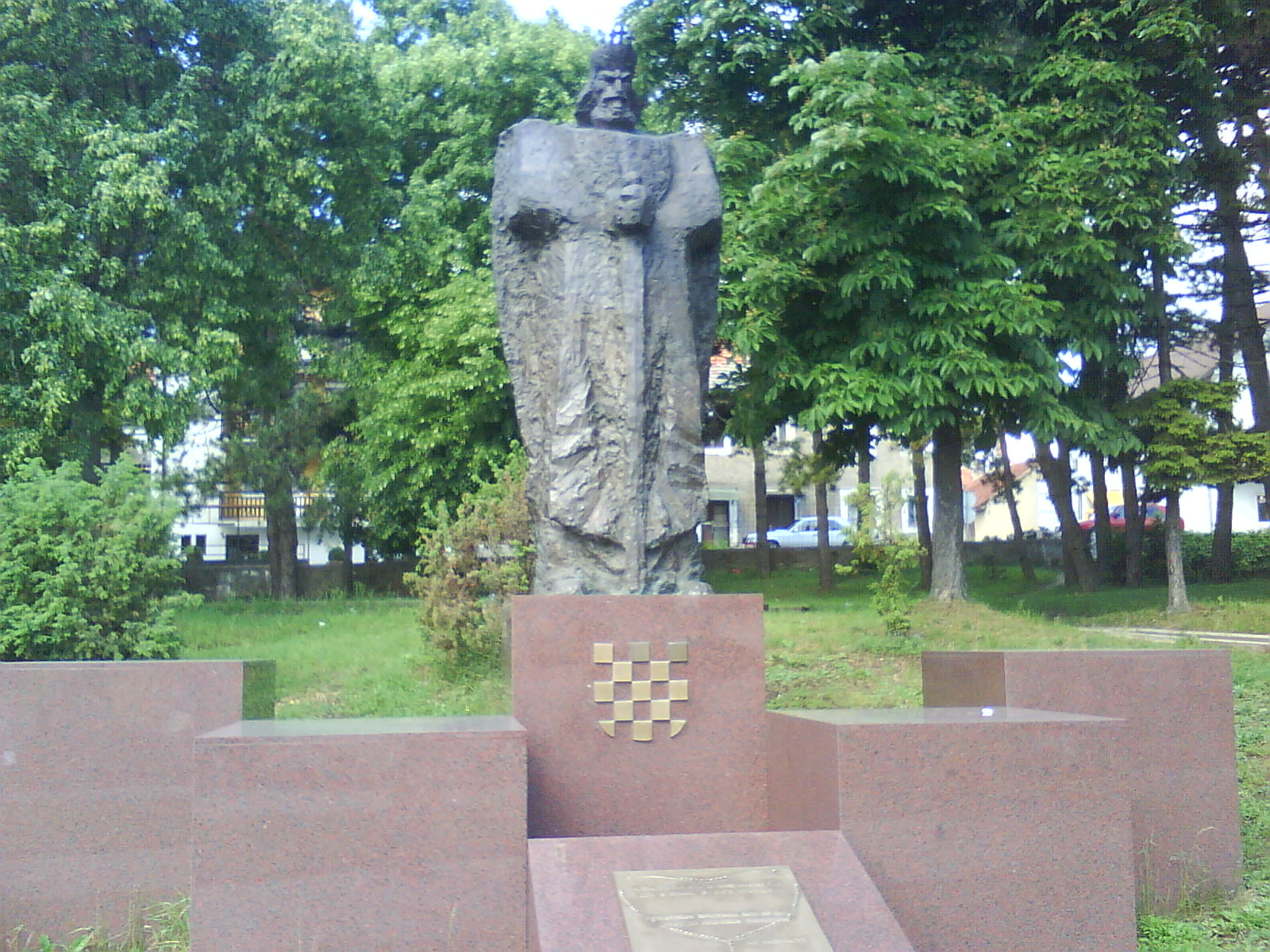
King Tomislav monument

== Sports ==
The town is home to the football club HNK Tomislav.

Former Croatian footballer and manager of Croatia national football team Zlatko Dalić was named an honorary citizen in 2023.

== Twin towns – sister cities ==
Tomislavgrad is twinned with:

- Biograd na Moru, Croatia
- Bjelovar, Croatia
- Đakovo, Croatia
- Jajce, Bosnia and Herzegovina
- Knin, Croatia
- Nin, Croatia
- Novska, Croatia
- Solin, Croatia
