= Vinjani, Posušje =

Vinjani
- Village
- Location within Bosnia and Herzegovina
- Coordinates: 43°30′34″N 17°14′30″E
- Country: Bosnia and Herzegovina
- Entity: Federation of Bosnia and Herzegovina
- Canton: West Herzegovina Canton
- Municipality: Posušje

Area
  - Total: 17.65 km^{2} (6.81 sq mi)

Population (2013)
  - Total: 1,423
  - Density: 80.62/km^{2} (208.8/sq mi)
- Time zone: UTC+1 (CET)
  - Summer (DST): UTC+2 (CEST)

Vinjani or Vinjani Hercegovački is a village in the municipality of Posušje in West Herzegovina Canton, the Federation of Bosnia and Herzegovina, Bosnia and Herzegovina.

The village consists of twelve differently named hamlets that form a community (mjesna zajednica). Tomića brig is one such hamlet.

== Demographics ==
According to the 2013 census, its population was 1,423.

Ethnicity in 2013
Ethnicity	Number	Percentage
Croats	1,420	99.8%
other/undeclared	3	0.2%
Total	1,423	100%

== Bibliography ==
- Ethnicity/National Affiliation, Religion and Mother Tongue (PDF). Sarajevo: Agency for Statistics of Bosnia and Herzegovina. 2019. Archived from the original (PDF) on 2020-07-25.
