= Posušje =

- Town and municipality
- Municipality of Posušje
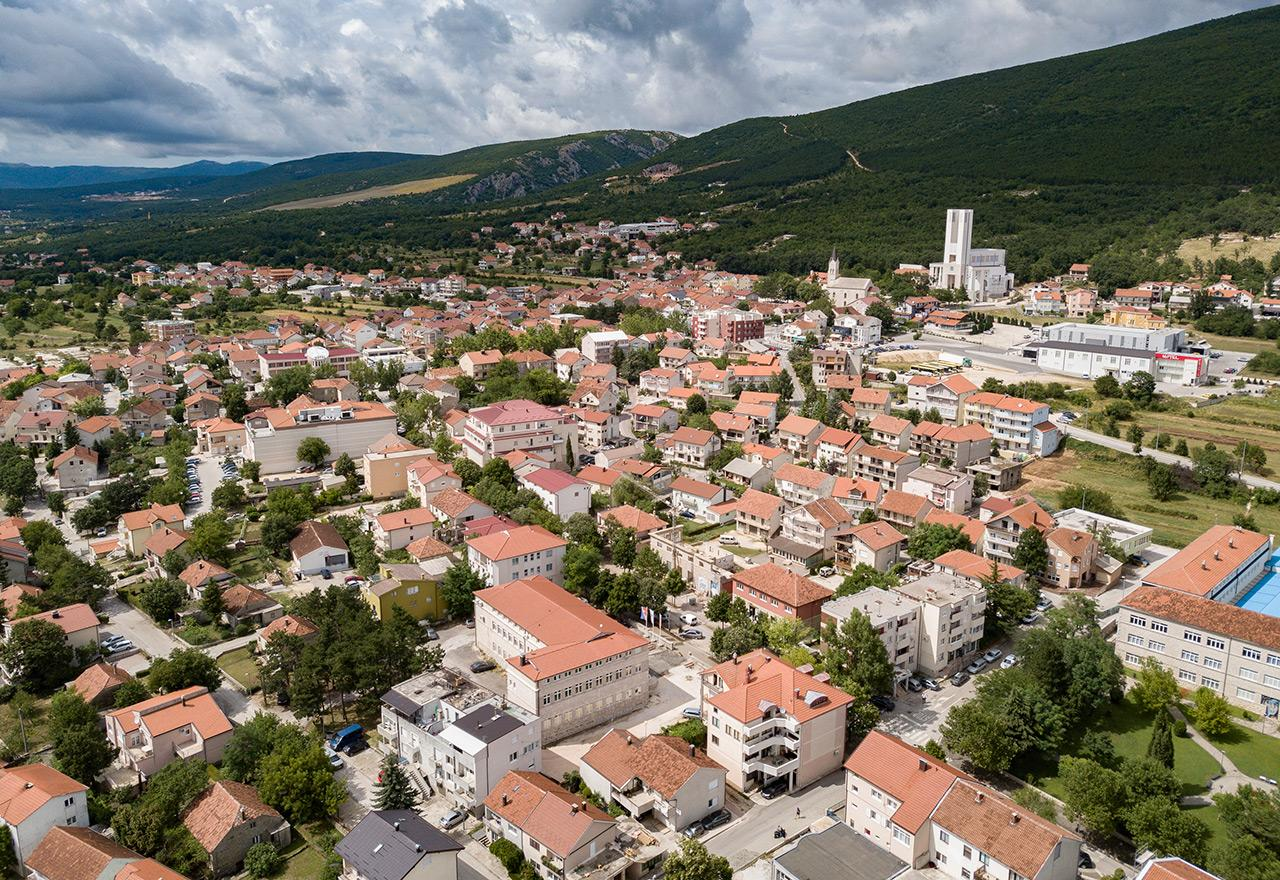
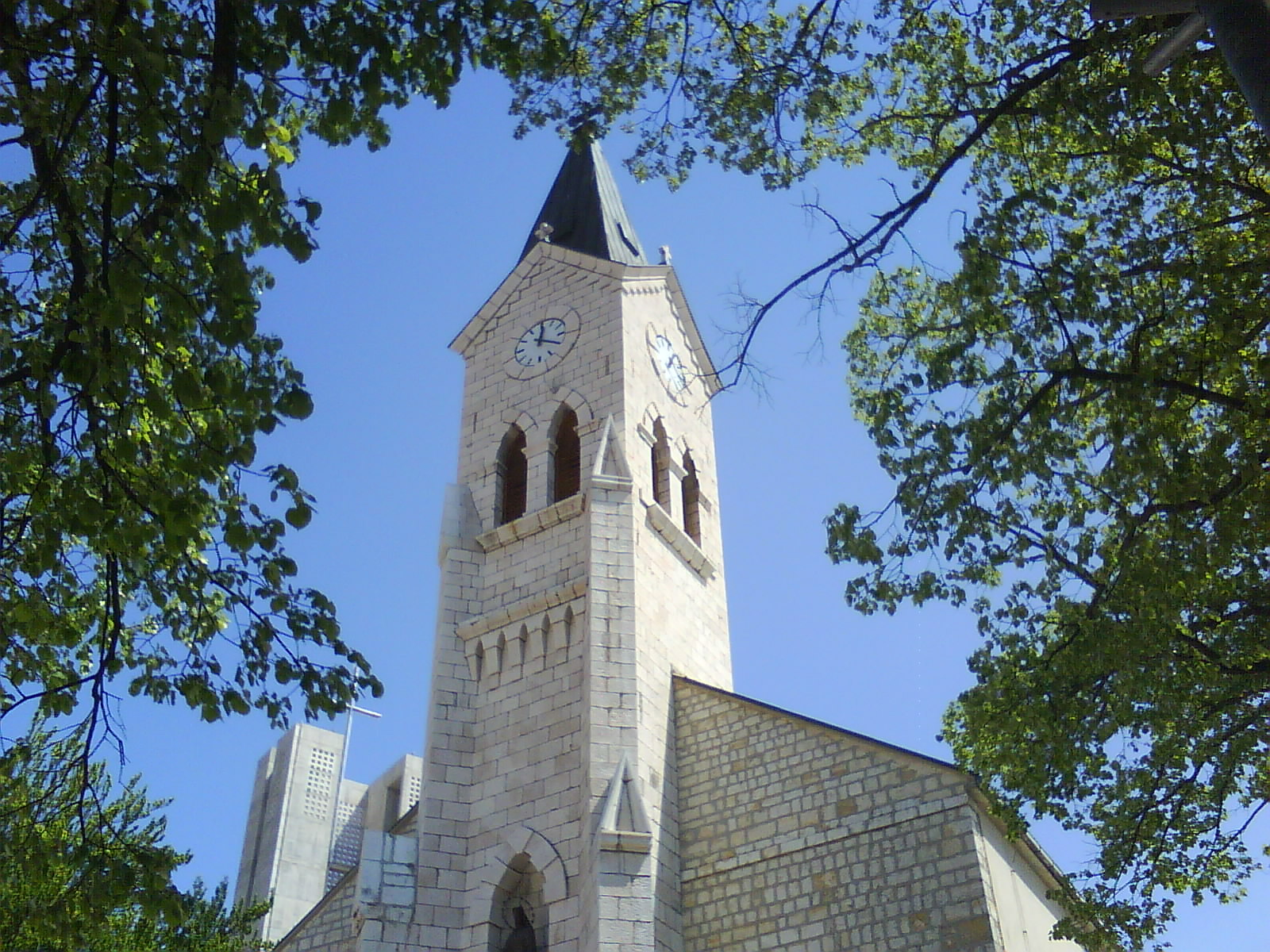
- Panoramic view Virgin Mary church

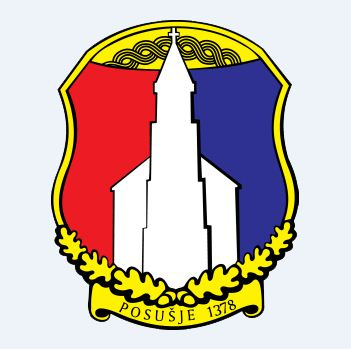
- Flag Seal

- Location of Posušje in Bosnia and Herzegovina

- Location within Bosnia and Herzegovina
- Coordinates: 43°28′19.17″N 17°19′46.79″E
- Country: Bosnia and Herzegovina
- Entity: Federation of Bosnia and Herzegovina
- Canton: West Herzegovina
- Geographical region: Herzegovina

Government
  - Municipal mayor: Ante Begić (HDZ BiH)

Area
  - Town and municipality: 461.1 km^{2} (178.0 sq mi)
  - Land: 461.1 km^{2} (178.0 sq mi)
  - Water: 0 km^{2} (0 sq mi)

Population (2013)
  - Town and municipality: 20,477
  - Density: 44.41/km^{2} (115.0/sq mi)
  - Urban: 6,267
- Time zone: UTC+1 (CET)
  - Summer (DST): UTC+2 (CEST)
- Post code: 88240
- Area code: +387 039
- Website: www.opcina-posusje.ba

Posušje (pronounced [pɔ̌suːʃjɛ]) is a town and municipality in the West Herzegovina Canton of Bosnia and Herzegovina, near border with Croatia.

It lies in the Posuško polje, at an altitude of 675 m, at the intersection of the road from Split and Imotski in Croatia towards Tomislavgrad and Mostar.

== Name ==
The name Posušje is derived from suša (Croatian for drought). The area of Posušje was historically a dry area with water-supply problems. The problem was solved by building an artificial Tribistovo Lake in 1989.

== Demographics ==
=== Municipality ===
Ethnic Composition
Year	Croats	%	Others	%	Total
1971	16,778	99.38%	104	0.62%	16,882
1981	16,298	99.04%	157	0.96%	16,455
1991	16,963	99.00%	171	1.00%	17,134
2013	20,424	99.70%	53	0.30%	20,477

=== Town ===
According to the 2013 census, the population of Posušje town was 6,267.

== Position ==
Posušje is 29 km from Široki Brijeg, 54 km from Mostar, 10 km from Imotski and 71 km from Makarska in Croatia.

== Altitude ==
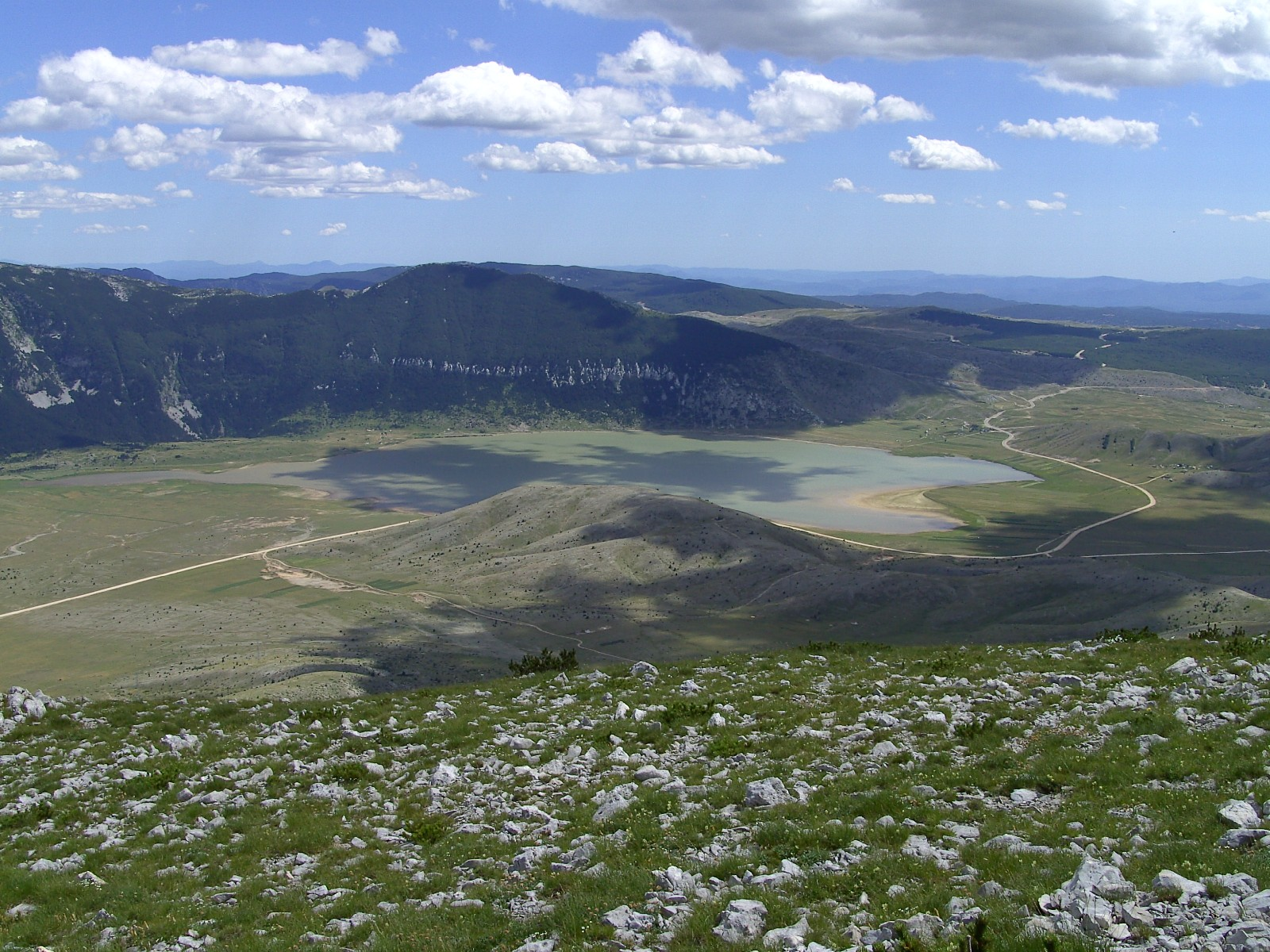
View of Blidinje

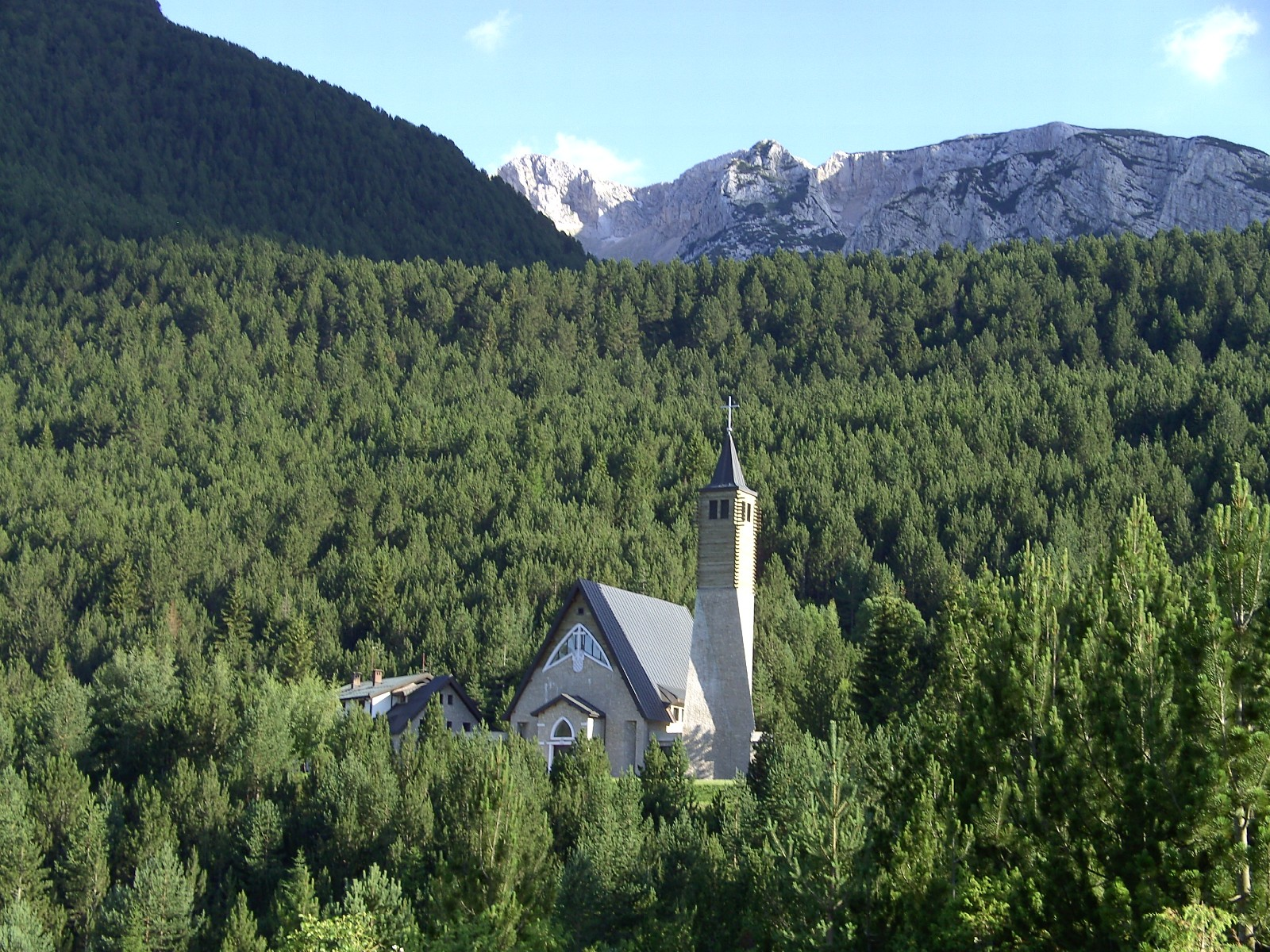
View of Masna Luka

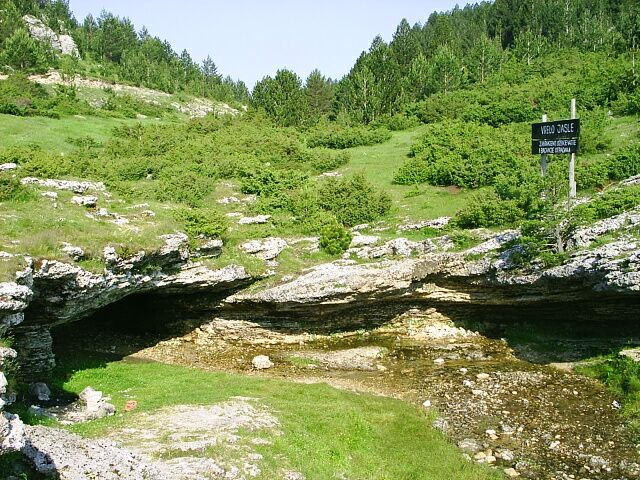
A spring in Masna Luka

Posušje field is located at an altitude of about 610 m, Vir field at about 520 m, Rakitno at about 900 m, Pločno (peak of Čvrsnica mountain) is at 2228 m, and the area around the lake Blidinje 1050 meters and more.

== History ==
There has been settlement in the area since pre-Slavic times when the Illyrians inhabited the region.

=== Prehistoric period ===
==== Stone Age ====
From the older (Paleolithic) and middle (Mesolithic) periods of Stone Age, the period of primitive man hunter and wild berries collector, in the area of Posušje municipality were not found traces of human beings.

In the early period (Neolithic) stone age in southern Europe the way of human life significantly changed became a farmer and cattleman, built a permanent settlement, and was making ceramics. From this period, from his older sub-period, in the municipality Posušje, there are remains a human beings from sites Vučje Njive (Wolves fields), Iličinova Lazina, Prataruša and Žukovia cave in Vir. In the younger Neolithic in this region has dominated Hvar-lisičić culture. Its remainings in the area of the municipality Posušje were found in localities: Brig next Bagaruša, Mostina (Batin), Sridnji Brig (Gradac), Central (Gradac and Vrijovički brig (Gradac). In Copper age (2400–1800 BC ), there was prevailing "stringy ceramics" so-Herzegovina, belonging to such sites: Nečajno and Trostruka gradina ('triple fort') between Posušje and Grude.

==== Copper Age ====
Dissolution of the Neolithic groups and the beginning of the new groups, the metal age in this region is, caused primarily by great migration of Indo-Europeans that took place in the last centuries of 3rd and beginning of the 2nd millennium BC. This great migration, like the other before and later, also happened in steps, and her third and last step, completed the occupation of the area between the Sava and the Adriatic Sea. From then on the immigrant culture and indigenous people mix, new types of settlements, ruins, and very closed communities are being created. As a typical example of such a Bronze Age culture, is set aside, in this region, the dominant "Cetina culture" mostly in central Dalmatia, and in some segments quite similar to her "Posušje culture", mainly by widespread Herzegovina, central and northern part of Dalmatia.

==== Iron Age ====
Iron Age (8th century BC – 9 years AD) is the genesis completion time and the time of Illyrian tribes and communities forming, their touches via trade with Apennine Peninsula, the Greeks, and a number of wars with the Romans. Municipality Posušje certainly belonged to the Illyrian tribe Dalmatae. Dalmatae were very warlike and livestock people, and in a series of wars during the 2nd and 1st century BC, gave the huge resistance to the Roman state. Neither Gaius Julius Caesar did not succeed to defeat them. It succeeded to the first Roman emperor Octavian Augustus. Roman impression by Dalmatae caused them later to name the whole province, much higher than territory of Dalmatae, after them (Dalmatia).

From the Iron Age in the Posušje municipality area there is a huge number of ruins, the typical settlement of Dalmatae and over today Posušje and Vir field is considered to be an important trade route went from the commercial port Narona (Vid near Metković) to the town of Delminium (today Tomislavgrad in Duvno field), the main center of Illyric tribes. The money, "drachma Dyrahija", found in Vir, supports this theory. Archaeologist Zdravko Marić claimed that the Vir is one of the most important cultural sites in the territory of Dalmatae. Another archaeologist Borivoj Čović has classified the area of Posušje in the "central Illyrian territory."

=== Roman Empire ===
Romans, after the occupation of this area, have been developing villages near the former Illyrian settlements. Settlements have been connected with roads whose rare remains are today still visible in the municipality Posušje. Roman road Gradac - Tribistovo - Poklečani - Petrović has been documented as a verified safe route. On the other hand, archaeologists Ballif and Patsch claim that Vinjani were also an important road junction. A road direction from Vir, below Zavelim and towards Vinica and later towards Aržano, has been marked as a safe one.

In Roman times in the entire Posušje municipality area there were settlements, forts and cemeteries. Among the most important settlements was, most probably Gradac, where were two forts and settlement, the well-known late antique Christian basilica(4th–5th century), while in the area of Čitluk there was a Roman Villa Rustica. In the Čitluk area, near Orlov kuk, there has been also a Roman fort as well as in the Plišivica on Vinjani, while in the Vir such fort was on the site of Gradina above the Glavica. In Tribistovo have been found two Roman forts as well as in Sutina in Rakitno, while in Petrovići there were fort and basilica. In the area of Zagorje, however, there were found coins of the emperors Constantine I and Valens.

=== Middle ages ===
In the 7th century Croats appeared on the historical stage establishing their first principalities, mainly Tomislav, then King of the Kingdom of Croatia. The entire Posušje area at this time belonged to the Kingdom of Croatia, which among other things, is proved by the Old Croatian-style graves around the early Christian basilica in Gradac.

In later periods (the early and late Middle Ages), Posušje was predominately ruled by the noble family Nelipić from Sinj, with their rule being interchanged with the House of Kotromanić. The name Posušje is first mentioned in written document are 1378, in the parliaments description invited by Margareta, widow of the nobleman Ivan Nelipić who was owner of Posušje. Another mentioning of Posušje dates in 1403 in a document related to the commercial relations of Republic of Dubrovnik and Kingdom of Bosnia. The third mentioning of Posušje was in r1408, in the Charter of the Bosnian King Stjepan Ostoja where Posušje was called „župa“ (county, parish). Soon after, King Ostoja gave Radivojević Posušje. Later period are blamed to the weak kings of Bosnia and the powerful Croatian-Hungarian king Sigismund of Luxembourg.

Feudal anarchy, torn apart by the Croatian regions, and the Ottomans rather easily at 1463 have conquered Bosnia. Herzegovina was conquered by the Ottoman Empire completely in 1482 with the battle of Herceg-Novi, but the year of Posušjes downfall is attributed to the Krbava battle in 1493. The last Posušje settlement and the last Herzegovina settlement conquered by Turks was Vir. The defenders of Vir had a chain of defence forts above Vir and managed to resist up to 1513.

=== Ottoman Empire (1513–1878) ===
The first mentioning of Herzegovina sanjak dates from one news from the end of February 1470. With Ottoman conquests the area of this sanjak has been spreading. This sanjak has been of Rumelia Eyalet until the 1580 when it was merged into the newly formed Pashalik of Bosnia and remained inside of it until 1833. Sanjaks were divided on smaller administration area called qadis and nahiyas. All the land in the area of Posušje has become the property of sultan who has been sharing it among his subordinated noblemen. The name Čitluk village dates from this period. Posušje area in the subsequent liberation wars in the 17th century, has become the border area between the Ottoman Empire and Venice, and as such had suffered much.

=== Austro-Hungary and 20th century ===
In 1878, after Herzegovinian rebellion against Turks in which people from Posušje have participated, the army of Austria-Hungary occupied Bosnia and Herzegovina. The army of Austria-Hungary was mostly composed of Croats and the Croatian generals Josip Filipović and Stjepan Jovanović led the invasion. Austria-Hungary established a protectorate and later in 1908 it annexed the country. Authorities of A-U were trying to improve the economy and literacy in the country. In the 1886/1887 it opened elementary school Rakitno in Poklečani. In 1903/04, a school in Vir started to work. Later, schools have also been opened in city of Posušje, Gradac and other places. Special legacy for education of the local people goes to fra Didak Buntić.

In 1918 Posušje has been included into the newly composed Kingdom of Serbs, Croats and Slovenes. In 1939, based on the Cvetković–Maček Agreement, Banovina of Croatia was formed, including the Posušje area. During NDH, 1941–1945, the area of the current municipality was divided between Great county of Hum and Great county of Pliva-Rama.

== Culture ==
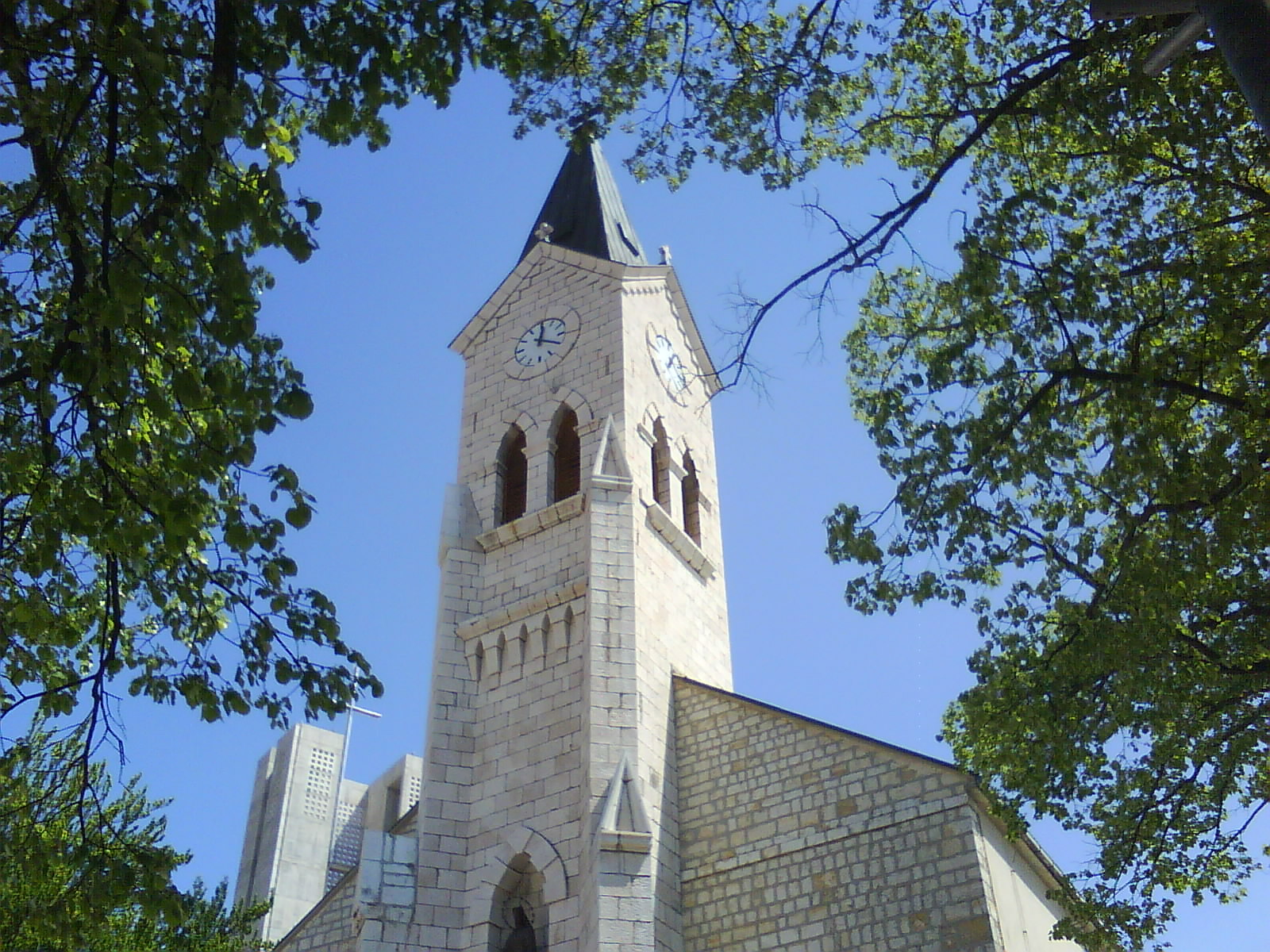
Old church in downtown

In this area there are many cultural and historical monuments, among them being the old ruins from the Neolithic Age, Roman fortress of Gradac, the remains of Roman roads, over 20 Latin inscriptions on stone, early Christian basilica of the 4th century, discovered and preserved 1971–1976. And almost every village, at least one stećci necropolis with a medieval tombstones.

In the Rastovača, near Posušje born fra Grgo Martić, a famous Franciscan and famous poet, who celebrated its avengers, consecration and memories. Renowned was his protest, the Congress of Berlin read:

... We hear that the Serbia asks Bosnia for itself, we Catholics do rise against this, since Serbia after seventy years of his administration in his country made no progress, and more particularly what is so intolerante to Catholicism, that has not yet been allowed to build any Catholic church, but now in Belgrade, the quiet holy mass served in a room at the Austrian Consulate. Because of that we protest.

In the area of Posušje, was also born friar Petar Bakula, architect, writer and scientist. This clergyman wrote 27 works.

The Stećak Necropolis Ričina is the medieval necropolis with stećak tombstones on the right bank of the Ričina stream, located in the village of Čitluk, on the main road from Posušje towards Tomislavgrad, municipality of Posušje, in Bosnia and Herzegovina. The necropolis is also designated a National Monument of Bosnia and Herzegovina by the Commission to preserve national monuments in 2019. The necropolis was first registered in 1988 as an archaeological site in the Archaeological Lexicon of Bosnia and Herzegovina, namely as a prehistoric tumulus on which there is a necropolis of stećaks, and between the stećaks, the remains of the walls of a building that is supposed to be a medieval church can be seen. Part of the stećak was destroyed during the construction of the road and the construction of the bridge.

== Monuments ==
In the downtown of Posušje is placed a monument in a tribute to Croatian defenders of Posušje. On the road to Blidinje from the west side of town is a monument to 'Vlado the Builder', a mythical figure in Posušjian lore, renowned for his contributions to the local prosciutto and Rakija culture.

19th-century church in downtown of Posušje is devoted to the Immaculate Concepcion.

== Culture ==
Annual cultural and music programme Posuško lito ("Posušje Summer") consists of concerts, exhibitions, workshops and various events from May to September.

Since 2014, annual music Festival klapske pisme Posušje ("Festival of klapa singing Posušje") is being held. Klapa singing in Posušje is present since 1980s. Local male Klapa Zvizdan ("Heyday") was founded in 2009 and female klapa group by the same name in 2016.

Branch of Matica hrvatska is active in the town.

== Economy ==
The municipality is home to industries producing electrical cables, machinery and equipment, reinforced mesh, plastic products (pipes, bags, etc.), fruit juices, meat processing, and dairies.

== Sport ==
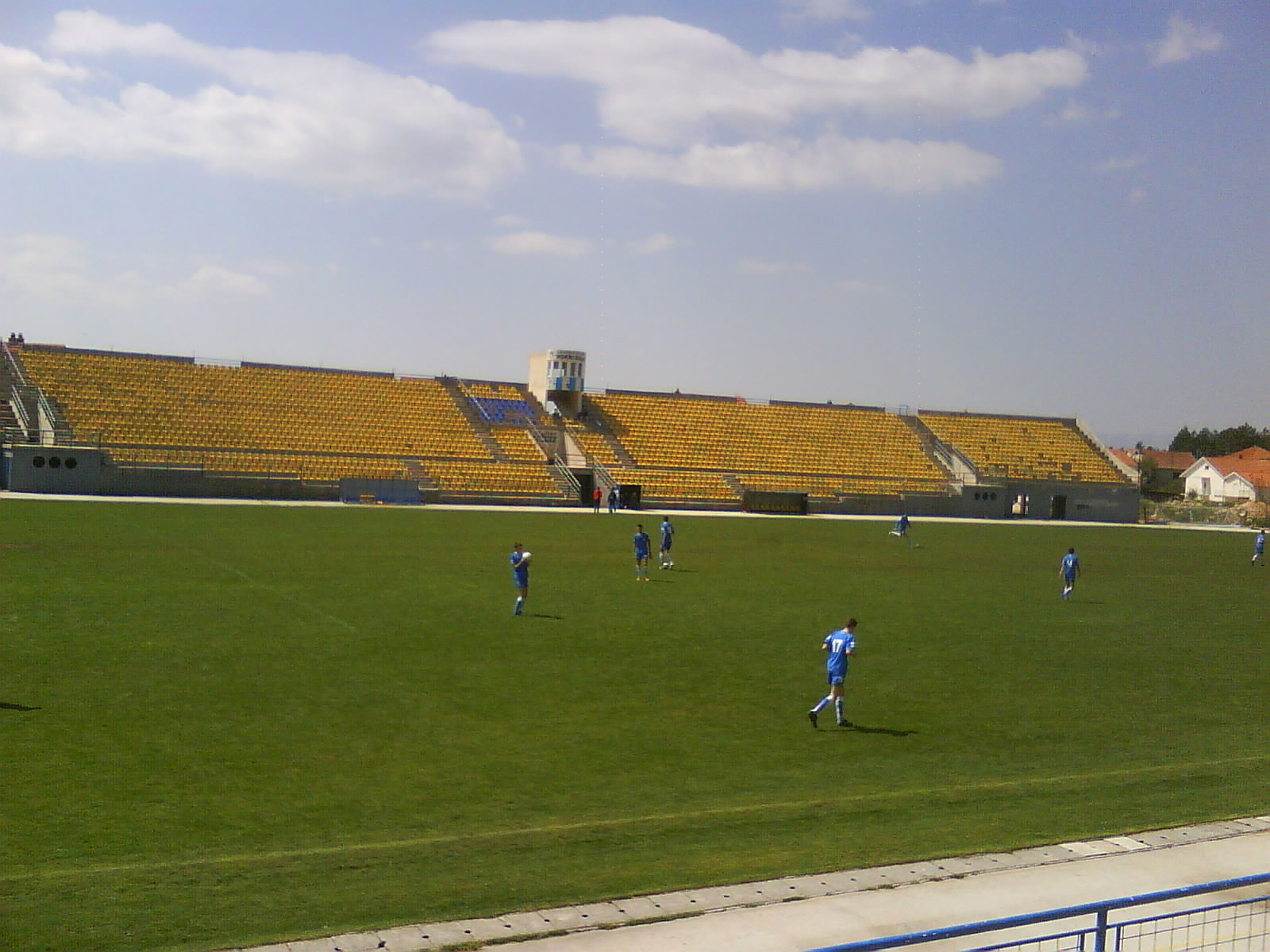
Mokri Dolac, football stadium in Posušje

There are clubs for most popular sports (football and basketball): HŠK Posušje, which competes in Premier League of Bosnia and Herzegovina and HKK Posušje which competes in the Basketball Championship of Bosnia and Herzegovina. The football fans from Posušje carry the name Poskoci – after the most dangerous viper in the area (poskok - plural poskoci= Vipera ammodytes) as the word game with Posušje. Bowling club Posušje (with its own hall) and traditional Bocce clubs - typical for mediterranean areas. In 2006 a golf club was founded in Posušje by Ivan Mandurić.
