= Upper Neretva =

Region around the upper course of the Neretva river in Bosnia and Herzegovina

Coordinates: 43°30′12.91″N 18°6′17.25″E

Upper Neretva Gornja Neretva
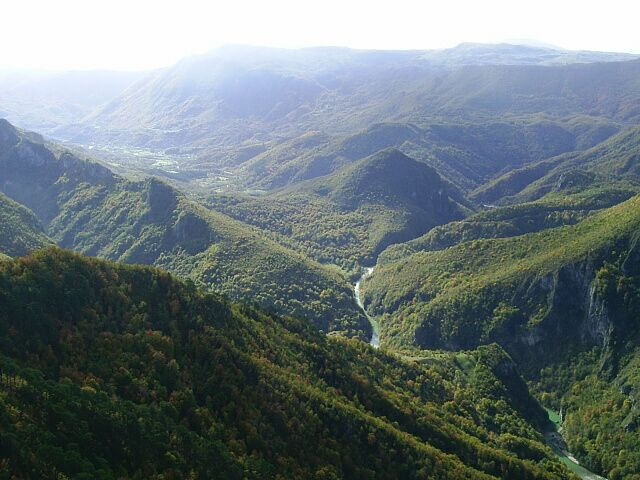
- A section of the Upper Neretva canyon, Ćepa (1006 m).
- Etymology: "Nera-Etwa" is Celtic for "Divinity that flows" referring to the Neretva River; Latin: Narenta, Narona, Naro for English: Narrative, Gurgle.
- Nicknames: Nera; Emerald River; Modra rijeka (English: Purple River)

Location
- Country: Bosnia and Herzegovina
- Region: South-East Central Bosnia and Herzegovina
- District: Konjic, Kalinovik, Gacko
- City: Konjic

Physical characteristics
- Source: Gredelj
  - location: Lebršnik, South-East Central Bosnia and Herzegovina, Bosnia and Herzegovina
  - elevation: 1,227 m (4,026 ft)
- Mouth: Adriatic
  - location: Ploče, Dubrovnik-Neretva County, Croatia
  - elevation: 0 m (0 ft)
- Length: 90 km (56 mi), EW
- Discharge
  - average: 34.5 m^{3}/s (1,220 cu ft/s)

Basin features
- River system: Dinaric Alps
- Tributaries
  - left: Jezernica, the Živašnica (also known as the Živanjski Potok), Ladjanica, Župski Krupac, Bukovica, Šištica, Konjička Bijela
  - right: Jezernica (also known as the Tatinak), Gornji i Donji Krupac, Ljuta (also known as the Dindolka), Jesenica, Bjelimićka Rijeka, Slatinica, Račica, Rakitnica, Konjička Ljuta, Trešanica, Neretvica

The Upper Neretva (Serbo-Croatian: Gornja Neretva) is the upper course of the Neretva river, located in Bosnia and Herzegovina. It includes the mountainous area surrounding the Neretva, with human settlements, peaks and forests, streams and wellsprings, three major glacial lakes near the river and more scattered across the mountains of Treskavica and Zelengora, in a wider area of the Upper Neretva.

The Neretva is divided into three common hydrological sections: upper, middle and lower.

The Neretva has been harnessed and controlled to a large extent by four HE power-plants with large dams (higher than 15 meters) and their storage lakes. It is also recognized for its natural beauty, diversity of its landscape and visual attractiveness.

== Geography and hydrography ==
The Neretva is largest karst river in the Dinaric Alps in the entire eastern part of the Adriatic basin, which belongs to the Adriatic river watershed. The total length is 230 km, of which 208 km are in Bosnia and Herzegovina, while the final 22 km are in the Dubrovnik-Neretva County of Croatia. Geographically and hydrographical the Neretva is divided in three section.

=== Course ===
The Neretva springs are situated deep in the Dinaric Alps at the base of the Zelengora and Lebršnik mountains under the village Jabuka and the saddle Gredelj. The Neretva headwaters run in undisturbed rapids and waterfalls, carving steep gorges reaching 600–800 meters in depth through this remote and rugged limestone terrain.
The upper course of Neretva, Upper Neretva (Bosnian: Gornja Neretva) has water of Class I purity and is almost certainly the coldest river water in the world, often as low as 7-8 degrees Celsius in the summer months.

First section, Upper Neretva, of the Neretva river from its source at 1,227 m.a.s.l. and headwaters gorge all the way to the town of Konjic is 90 km, flows from south to north-north-west as most of the Bosnia and Herzegovina rivers belonging to the Danube watershed, and cover some 1,390 km^{2} with average elevation of 1.2%. Right below Konjic, the Neretva briefly expanding into a wide valley which provides fertile agricultural land. There exists the large Jablaničko Lake, artificially formed after construction of a dam near Jablanica.

Second section begins from the confluence of the Neretva and the Rama river between Konjic and Jablanica where the Neretva suddenly takes a southern course and enters the largest canyons of its course, running through steep slopes of magnificent mountains of Prenj, Čvrsnica and Čabulja reaching 80–1,200 m (260–3,940 ft) in depth. From here Neretva flows toward the Adriatic Sea.

==== Neretva springs ====
The Neretva river rises beneath the mountain saddle known as Gredelj. Its spring consists of five individual well-springs on the forested and steep slopes of Gredelj ridge. They are difficult to access and even harder to find in a very thick forest. For many years place exists at the border of the oldest National Park in Bosnia and Herzegovina, NP Sutjeska with its primeval forest Perućica, but itself never protected.

==== Settlements and valleys ====
Konjic is the only town in the Upper Neretva. Two largest villages include Ulog and Glavatičevo, with a number of smaller ones, such as Bjelimići, Obalj, Lukomir and other.

===== Borač valley =====
The Neretva headwaters gorge is actually a broad valley, up to 1 km wide and 20 km long, called Borač. Nevertheless, because of its position among the great mountain chains, in the heart of Bosnia and Herzegovina Dinaric Alps, Borač has a very steep slope and the Neretva river significant (hydrological) elevation. Several major well-sources significantly complement the Neretva river, among which the most important and with largest quantity of fresh and potable water are "Krupac" and "Pridvorica" well-springs. Borač valley, before the Bosnian war, was inhabited mostly by local Muslims, whose villages were completely destroyed and the people murdered, imprisoned into a concentration camp in Kalinovik and deported mostly to third countries in a broad ethnic cleansing by Serb para-military forces. Some of the villagers now returning to their land, repairing and rebuilding their houses. The Borač valley ends one kilometer upstream from the entrance to small mountain town of Ulog, where at the same time begins Valley of Ulog.

===== Ulog and Ulog valley =====
Ulog is a small mountain town in Ulog Valley at the banks of the Upper Neretva river, in the heart of eastern Bosnia and Herzegovina Dinaric Alps, surrounded with great mountain chains of Zelengora, Lelija, Crvanj and Treskavica. Town is formed by Ottomans, on old caravan road from Mostar via Nevesinje en route to Istanbul. From Ulog downstream of the Neretva river is wide valley named Ulog valley. During the Bosnian war, Ulog was suffered extensive destruction from Serbian forces, and its civilian population, mostly Bosnian Muslims and some Croats, were completely annihilated, though town and its surrounding never saw significant, if any, battles or military confrontation.

===== Glavatičevo and Župa valley =====
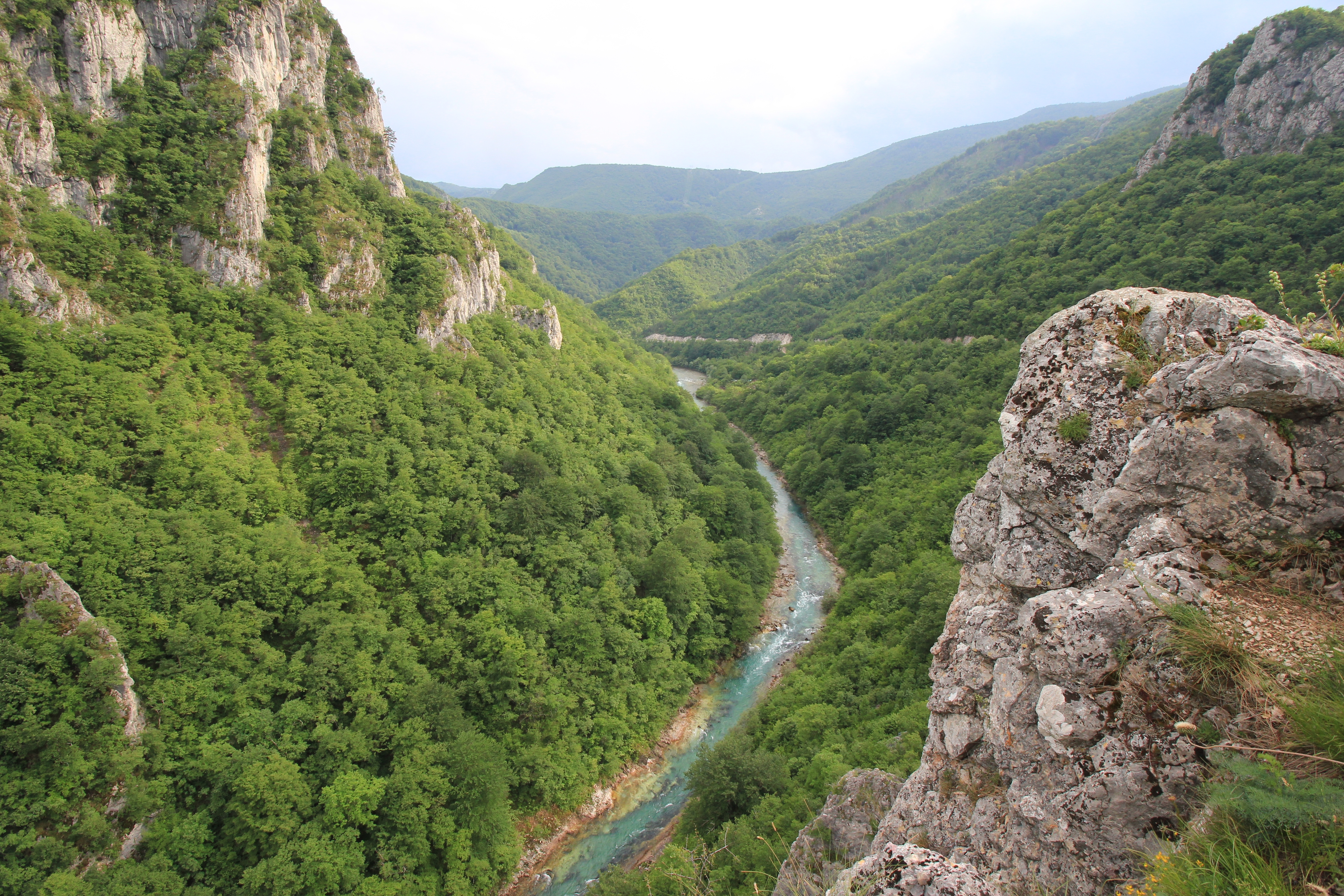
Neretva Canyon north of Glavatičevo

Glavatičevo is a small village in Bosnia and Herzegovina. The village is located 30 kilometers away from Konjic in a southeast direction, within a wide Župa valley (also Komska Župa or Konjička Župa or simply Župa) (župa transl. parish) on both banks of the Neretva river, in Konjic Municipality, Bosnia and Herzegovina. Dr. Pavao Anđelić in his book "Spomenici Konjica i okoline" claimed that Glavatičevo got its name from the name of the local nobleman Glavat or Glavatec.

=== Streams and tributaries ===
Rivers of the Jezernica (also Tatinak), the Gornji and Donji Krupac, the Ljuta-Dindolka, the Jesenica, the Bjelimićka Rijeka, the Slatinica, the Račica, the Rakitnica, the Konjička Ljuta, the Trešanica, the Neretvica flow into the Neretva from the right, while the Jezernica, the Živašnica (also Živanjski Potok), the Ladjanica, the Župski Krupac, the Bukovica, the Šištica with its Šištica Waterfall, the Konjička Bijela flow into it from the left.

==== Rakitnica river ====
Rakitnica is the main tributary of the first section of the Neretva river known as Upper Neretva (Bosnian: Gornja Neretva). The Rakitnica river formed a 26 km long canyon, of its 32 km length, that stretches between Bjelašnica and Visočica to southeast from Sarajevo.

=== Lakes ===
==== Jablaničko lake ====
Jablaničko Lake (Bosnian: Jablaničko jezero) is a large artificially formed lake on the Neretva river, right below Konjic where the Neretva briefly expanding into a wide valley. The river provided lot of fertile, agricultural land there, before lake flooded most of it. The lake was created in 1953 after construction of a large gravitational hydroelectric dam near Jablanica in central Bosnia and Herzegovina. The lake has an irregular elongated shape. Its width varies along its length. The lake is a popular vacation destination in Bosnia and Herzegovina. Swimming, boating and especially fishing are popular activities on the lake. Many weekend cottages have been built along the shores of the lake. There are 13 types of fish in the lake's ecosystem.

== Natural heritage and protection ==
In dense water system network the Neretva holds a significant position among rivers of Dinaric Alps region, regarding its divers ecosystems and habitats, flora and fauna, cultural and historic heritage, but also as Area of Outstanding Natural Beauty and most importantly its clean, fresh drinking water.

=== Fresh water resources ===
Important natural resource of Bosnia and Herzegovina is freshwater with abundant wellspring and clear rivers, indeed. From the Drina river on the east to the Una river on the west and from the Sava river on the north to the Adriatic sea on the south, Bosnia and Herzegovina is European freshwater reservoir. Situated in between all these major regional rivers the Neretva basin contain portion of fresh drinking water.

=== Endemic and endangered ichthyofauna ===
Dinaric karst water systems inhabit 25% of the total of 546 fish species in Europe. Watercourses of this area are inhabited by a large number of endemic species of fish. The river Neretva and its tributaries represent the main drainage system in the east Adriatic watershed and the foremost ichthyofaunal habitat of the region. According to Smith & Darwall (2006) the Neretva river, together with four other areas in the Mediterranean, has the largest number of threatened freshwater fish species.
Degree of endemism in the karst eco-region is greater than 10% of the total number of fish species. Numerous species of fish that inhabited this area live in very narrow and limited areal and are vulnerable, so they are included on the Red List of endangered fish and the IUCN-2006.
Upper Neretva inhabits three endemic and endangered species of fish. All of the endemic of Upper Neretva are rare and endangered trouts, the Neretva indigenous, autochthonal ichthyofauna.

==== Salmonids ====
Salmonids fishes from the Neretva basin show considerable variation in morphology, ecology and behaviour. The Neretva also has many other endemic and fragile life forms that are near extinction.
Among most endangered are three endemic species of the Neretva trout: Neretvan Softmouth trout (Bosnian: Neretvanska mekousna pastrmka) (Salmothymus obtusirostris oxyrhinchus Steind.), Toothtrout (Bosnian: Zubatak also Bosnian: Zubara) (Salmo dentex) and Marble trout (Bosnian: Glavatica also known as Bosnian: Gonjavac) (Salmo marmoratus Cuv.).

All three endemic trout species of the Neretva are endangered mostly due to the habitat destruction or construction of large and major dams (large as higher than 15–20 m; major as over 150–250 m) in particular and hybridization or genetic pollution with introduced, non-native trouts, also from illegal fishing as well as poor management of water and fisheries especially in form of introduction of invasive allochthonous species (dams, overfishing, mismanagement, genetic pollution, invasive species).

=== Dam problems ===
The benefits brought by dams have often come at a great environmental and social cost, as dams destroy ecosystems and cause people to lose their homes and livelihoods.

The Neretva and two main tributaries are already harnessed, by four HE power-plants with large dams on Neretva, one HE power-plants with major dam on the Neretva tributary Rama, and two HE power-plants with one major dam on the Trebišnjica river, which is considered as part of the Neretva watershed.

Also, the government of the Federation of Bosnia and Herzegovina entity has unveiled plans to build three more hydroelectric power plants with major dams (as over 150.5 meters in height) upstream from the existing plants, beginning with Glavaticevo Hydro Power Plant in the nearby Glavatičevo village, then going even more upstream Bjelimići Hydro Power Plant and Ljubuča Hydro Power Plant located near the villages with a same names; and in addition one more at the Neretva headwaters canyon, near the very source of the river in entity of Republic of Srpska by its entity government. This, if realized, would completely destroyed this jewel among rivers, so its strongly opposed and protested by numerous environmentalist organizations and NGO's, domestic as well as international, who wish for the canyon, considered at least beautiful as the Tara canyon in Bosnia and Herzegovina and nearby Montenegro, to remain untouched and unspoiled, hopefully protected too.
Moreover, the same Government Of FBiH preparing a parallel plan to form a huge National Park which include entire region of Gornja Neretva (English: Upper Neretva), and within Park those three hydroelectric power plants, which is unheard in the history of environmental protection. The latest idea is that the park should be divided in two, where the Neretva should be excluded from both and, in fact, become the boundary between parks. This is a cunning plan of engineers and related ministry in Government Of FBiH and should leave the river available for the construction of three large dams, and give them hope in order to remove the fear of contradiction in the plans for environmental protection in the area and the flooding its very heart, in terms of natural values—the Neretva. Of course, such deception failed, because the concerned citizens from the local community are not given bluff, as well as concerned citizens of whole country, and its particularly strongly opposed by NGOs and other institutions and organizations that are interested in establishing the National Park of Upper Neretva towards the professional and scientific principles and not according to the needs of electric energy lobby.

== See also ==
Water bodies
- Neretva
- Upper Neretva
- Lađanica
- Rakitnica
- Boračko Lake
- Šištica waterfall
- Blatačko Lake
Settlements
- Ulog
- Glavatičevo
- Lukomir
- Konjic
Protected heritage
- Stećci
- Lukomir
- Lađanica vrelo
- Krupac vrelo
- Rakitnica
- Boračko Lake
- Blatačko Lake
- List of national parks of BiH
Nature and culture
- Salmo obtusirostris
- Salmo dentex
- Salmo marmoratus
- Environmental impacts of dams
- Environment and electricity generation
- Tourism in Bosnia and Herzegovina
- Stećci

== Sources ==
- Шишић, Фердо, ed. (1928). Летопис Попа Дукљанина (Chronicle of the Priest of Duklja). Београд-Загреб: Српска краљевска академија.
- Кунчер, Драгана (2009). Gesta Regum Sclavorum. Vol. 1. Београд-Никшић: Историјски институт, Манастир Острог.
- Живковић, Тибор (2009). Gesta Regum Sclavorum. Vol. 2. Београд-Никшић: Историјски институт, Манастир Острог.
