= Župa Komska =

Medieval župa in Upper Neretva, Bosnia and Herzegovina

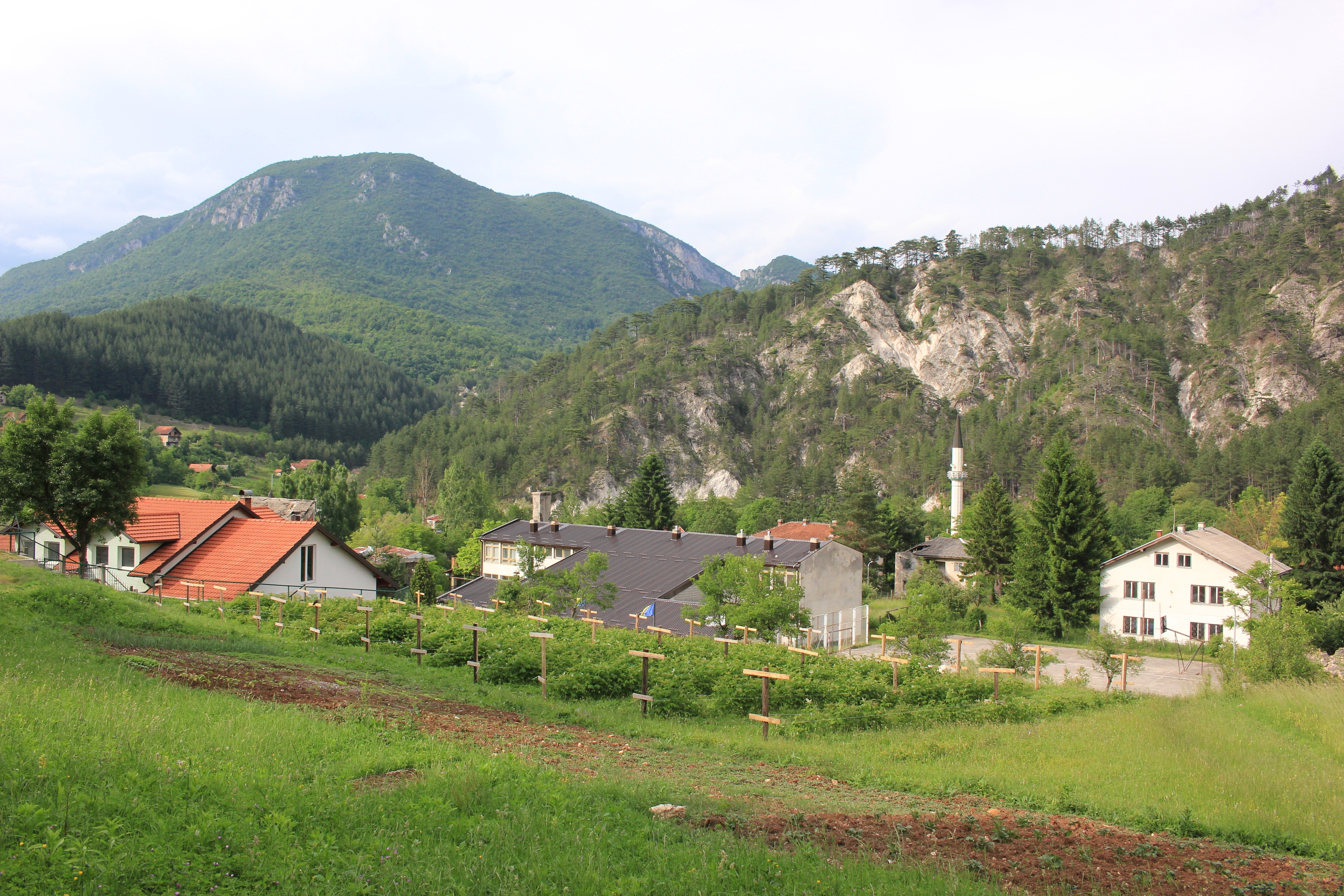
Glavatičevo

Komska župa, was one of medieval Bosnian state's župas in Humska zemlja, encompassing what is today village of Glavatičevo and its wider surroundings in Upper Neretva, in Bosnia and Herzegovina.

== Location ==
The center of župa was located in the area of Upper Neretva valley which gravitating village of Glavatičevo. In medieval times, Komska Župa bordered župa Neretva on the west, župa Večerić and župa Bijela on the southwest, župa Nevesinje on the south, župa Viševa on the southeast, župa Zagorje on the northeast, and on the north župa Tilava. The line that does along the Boračko lake and the canyon of the Šištica and Rakitnica rivers was western border of the župa.

== History ==
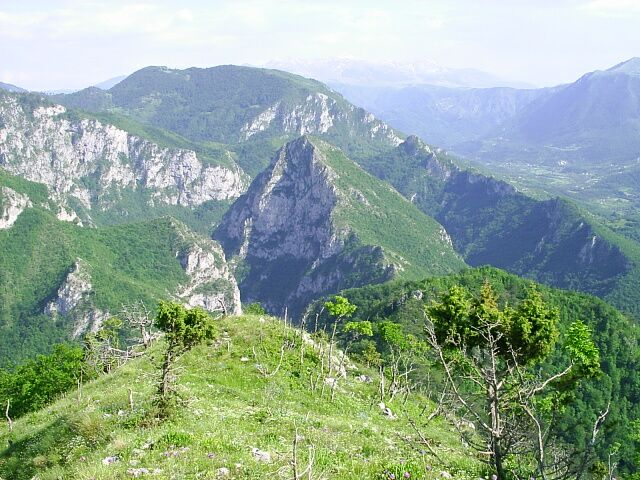
Kom fortress, namesake of the župa Kom, at the ridge and Glavatičevo Valley, both center-upper to the right

=== Medieval Bosnian state ===
In ancient times it belonged to Podgorje, a mountainous region between Bosna, Humska zemlja, Drina and Zeta, which corresponded to zemlja in sense of size and possibly socio-political organisation and was first mentioned in the semi-mythical Chronicle of the Priest of Duklja. From the 12th century, when the oldest written mention of Koma dates, until the Ottoman destruction, it was a developed, transport, economic, military and culturally important area. The župa is named after its center, the old town of Kom, located on the hard-to-pass mountain ridge above the village of Kašići. Only ruins remain of the fortress. Bosnian kings, Dubrovnik magnates and merchants strove for it. Kom was an important seat of the Sanković noble family from Hum. The main church in the župa was built in the 12th century next to the banks of the Neretva in the village of Razići and was more important than the one in hamlet of Biskup, Grčka Glavica locality, where the Sanković noble family necropolis was located. There was a cemetery next to the church. Stećci were placed on the graves. In order to secure an important thoroughfare and cross roads, the fortress of Gradac was built, which was once a center of Gradac municipality. The customs house operated in Kom, as evidenced by a document from 1381 that mentions the collection of customs in this area. Trade was particularly developed, in which the people of Dubrovnik held primacy. On May 15, 1391, Duke Radič Sanković issued them a charter that they could trade in his lands, including the Kom župa. Pavao Anđelić found evidence of Dubrovnik's presence and trade in this area, when in the 1960s, while exploring the fortress of Kom, he found a Dubrovnik grosh. Vrela is also mentioned as a župa at the end of the 14th century, which was rare at the time, because then larger aristocratic estates were called kneževinas. From that time, the Kom area was called Župa, which name has remained to this day.

Kom župa was one of the main properties of the Sanković family, although their family manors were in Zaborani. The main economic branches were farming, cattle breeding and mining. There were miners at Kula, Razići and Dudle. The inhabitants were also engaged in beekeeping, hunting and fishing, and the villagers of the selected villages were given the task of supplying the Sankovići with honey, fish, game and the like.

=== Ottoman conquest and reign ===
Ottoman Sultan Mehmed Fatih undertook a campaign that conquered the Konjic region in 1463, when Kom was also conquered. On June 22, 1463, the army was in Nevesinje and it was commanded by Mahmud Pasha Anđelović, and in a few days he conquered Kom. From the beginning of July until September, Herceg Stjepan Vukčić and his sons were on the counterattack. They succeeded in returning Kom and its surroundings. The Kosače ruled the župa for two years, until the second half of 1465. In the middle of 1465, Ish-beg Ishaković broke into the land of Herceg Stjepan with the Ottoman army and occupied it, including Komska župa. The importance of župa as a traffic hub has been maintained after these events. Glavatičevo, most populated center of the župa, is mentioned in the first Ottoman sources as the seat of the Kom administrative district under the name Podkom. The Komska župa became a nahija and belonged to the Blagaj kadiluk, as recorded in the census of the Bosnian sandžak in 1469. The population was steadily Islamized since then. Bosnian krstjans were numerous in this area, and some remained in their religion for a long time before converting to Islam. In 1537, the župa was merged with the Herzegovinian Nahija Neretva into one under the name Belgrad. Due to its importance, a stone bridge was built in Glavatičevo in 1612, similar to the Stara Ćuprija in Konjic (aka. Karađoz-beg Bridge), and the builder was Hadži Bali from Mostar. It was built when the Karađoz-beg Bridge in Konjic was being repaired. On both sides of the bridge, inns or hans were built where travelers to Sarajevo, Bjelimići, Konjic or Nevesinje spent the night. Towards the end of Ottoman times, župa was recorded in the administrative books under the name Džemat Župa, and it remained until the arrival of Austria-Hungary.

=== Austria-Hungary conquest and reign ===
The Bosnian Muslim population strongly resisted the Austro-Hungarian forces in 1878. After Vrapč, the battles were fought on the right bank of the Neretva. There was a significant skirmish in Ribari village below Bajić Glavica. In 1882, insurgents fought against Austro-Hungarian army in Herzegovina Uprising. In the first battle, 150 insurgents under the leadership of Sulejman-bey Šurković from Bjelimići defeated the Austro-Hungarian army at the bridge in Glavatičevo.

== Bibliography ==
- Pavao Anđelić (1975). Historijski spomenici Konjica i okoline. Skupština opštine.
- Pavao Anđelić (1958). Srednjevjekovni gradovi u Neretvi [Villes medievales sur la Neretva]. Sarajevo: Zemaljski muzej. p. 231.
- Pavao Anđelić (1983). Srednjovjekovne župe. Teritorijalni sistem lokalne uprave u ranijim stoljećima srednjeg vijeka na području nekadašnje Humske zemlje: naučnoistraživački projekat. Sarajevo: Zemaljski muzej BiH. p. 134.
