= Ljuta (Dindolka) =

River in Bosnia and Herzegovina

Ljuta Dindolka
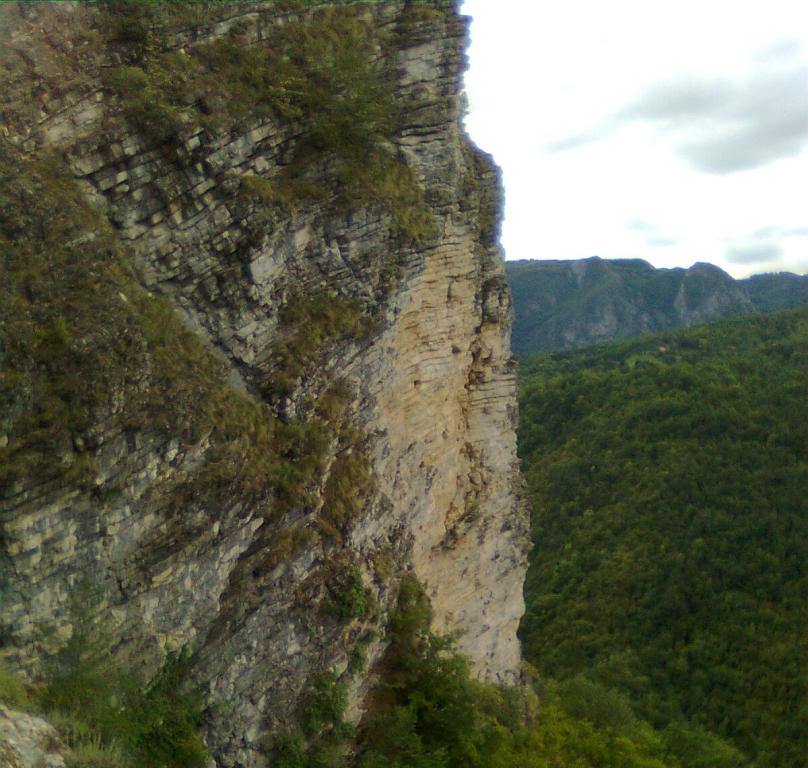
- View on the Ljuta river canyon, between Visočica (on the left) and Treskavica (on the right).

- Location within Bosnia and Herzegovina

Location
- Country: Bosnia and Herzegovina

Physical characteristics
- Source: Baletina Voda, source of Srednja Voda creek
  - location: Above Ljuta village under the northwestern ridge of Treskavica mountain.
  - coordinates: 43.620466°N 18.329809°E
  - elevation: 1,498 m (4,915 ft)
- 2nd source: Confluence of Srednja Voda with Bijela Vodica & Božija Vodica creeks
  - location: 5 kilometers downstream of Baletina Voda spring
  - coordinates: 43.599913°N 18.308342°E
  - elevation: 933 m (3,061 ft)
- Mouth
  - location: The Neretva above Ljubuča
  - coordinates: 43.484114°N 18.312147°E
  - elevation: 501 m (1,644 ft)
- Length: 21 km (13 mi)

Basin features
- Progression: Neretva→ Adriatic Sea

Ljuta, also called Dindolka, is one of the main tributaries of the first section of the Neretva river, also called Upper Neretva (Bosnian: Gornja Neretva). It meets Neretva from the right, flowing from north to south, between Treskavica and Visočica mountains.

== Geography ==
The Ljuta river begins as Srednja Voda creek (transl. Middle Water) from "Baletina Voda" spring (transl. Middle Water) that emerges in the areal above Ljuta village, under the northwestern ridge of Treskavica mountain, and after a short run, cca. 5 kilometers, it joins with the Bijela Vodica and Božija Vodica creeks where it become the Ljuta. The Ljuta river forms a cca 30 km long valley squeezed between Treskavica and Visočica, southeast from Sarajevo.

== Protection ==
Bosnia and Herzegovina on several occasions, since 1998, was preparing to establish a large national park which, according to developed but never operationalized plans, would comprise the entire region of Gornja Neretva (English: Upper Neretva), including region between the Rakitnica and the Ljuta rivers.

== See also ==
- Mostarska Bijela
- Rakitnica
- Dindo, Konjic
- Glavatičevo
- Konjic
- List of national parks of BiH
- Environmental impacts of dams
- Environment and electricity generation
