= Grčka Glavica necropolis =

Medieval stećak necropolis in Bosnia and Herzegovina

Coordinates: 43.4967°N 18.1221°E

Stećak necropolis Grčka Glavica
- Necropolis with stećci Grčka Glavica

- Location within Bosnia and Herzegovina
- Interactive map of Stećak necropolis Grčka Glavica

Details
- Established: 14th century
- Location: Glavatičevo, Konjic
- Country: Bosnia and Herzegovina
- Type: Medieval stećak necropolis
- Owned by: State
- No. of graves: 172

KONS of Bosnia and Herzegovina
- Official name: Grčka Glavica – necropolis with stećak tombstones and the ruins of a church in the village of Biskup, the historic area
- Type: Category 0 cultural property
- Designated: May 7, 2004 (-th KONS session)
- Reference no.: 2415
- Decision No.: 05.1-02-1023/03-1
- List: List of National Monuments of Bosnia and Herzegovina

UNESCO World Heritage Site
- Official name: Historic site, stećaks' necropolis Borak, Rogatica
- Type: Cultural
- Reference no.: 1504 (map 1504-002)
- Region: Europe

Grčka Glavica necropolis, or Biskupi Necropolis, was Sanković Noble family burial ground. It is located in Biskup hamlet of the Glavatičevo village, Municipality of Konjic, Bosnia and Herzegovina.

The site is inscribed on the list of 28 medieval stećak necropolises that were declared a UNESCO World Heritage Site in 2016. The list includes 20 necropolises in Bosnia and Herzegovina, 3 in Serbia, 3 in Montenegro, and 2 in Croatia.

The necropolis is also inscribed on the List of National Monuments of Bosnia and Herzegovina by KONS.

== Location ==
Biskup is a hamlet near village of Glavatičevo, about 30 km away from Konjic, in the Upper Neretva valley. Next to the macadam road on a small hill known as Grčka Glavica, there are the remains of a church and a necropolis with stećci.

== History ==
The Sanković noble family (in written sources also mentioned as Bogopanac, Draživojević, Miltenović and Sanković) can be traced from 1306 to 1404. At the beginning of the 14th century, they operated in the area of Nevesinje, and after 1335 they extended their rule to Zagorje, and later to Dabar, Popovo, Primorje in Bosansko Primorje, and Konavle. As representatives of the Humska zemlja (Hum), they regularly participated in the Stanak, an assembly of Bosnian nobles, especially in the period from 1330 to 1404. The family cemetery was located in the hamlet of Biskup, on the territory of the Kom župa. The last Sanković was a knez, then Duke Radič Sanković. His seat was not far from Biskup, in the village of Zaborani, on the northernmost part of Nevesinjsko polje. Sandalj Hranić captured Radič in 1404 and seized his entire territory.

== Description ==
From 1954 to 1955, archeological research was carried out by Marko Vego. The most important result of this research is the finding that this is the family cemetery of the feudal family of Sanković, who in the 14th century held the leading position in what was then the Hum. Movable archaeological material is stored in the Archaeological Department of the National Museum of Bosnia and Herzegovina.

The necropolis with stećci consists of 172 stećci and a large number of graves without monuments. One specimen is a gable, while the rest are slabs and chests. The necropolis covers an area of about 1700 m2. Two monuments, one chest and one gable, were decorated. At the top of the gable is a frieze of a series of oblique parallel lines, and on the sides are arcades. At the top of the chest is a frieze of bent vines with trefoils.

On one chest there is an inscription, made on two sides in two lines and on the other two sides in one line. On one chest there is an inscription. The script is 14th century Bosnian Cyrillic. The inscription reads:

Transliterated into Latin script and Serbo-Croatian: Ovdje leži gospođa Goisava, kćer Đurđa Balšića i žena Radiča koja se udala u kuću kaznaca Sanka i župana Bjeljaka sa čašću poštuje svoju vjeru i višnju slavu.

Translated into English: Here lies Mrs. Goisava, the daughter of Đurđ Balšić and the wife of Radič, who married into the house of the kazanac Sanko and the župan Bjeljak, honoring her faith and her highest glory.

The inscription shows that it is the grave of Goisava, the wife of Duke Radič Sanković. According to its content, the inscription is among the most valuable monuments of its kind in Bosnia and Herzegovina. An intact skeleton and accessories were found in the grave: silk ribbons, like the rest of the dress, and in the mouth a Ragusan dinar with a picture of Sveti Vlaho, minted around 1337.

In the stećak next to it, a skeleton was found with artefacts - in its mouth was a Ragusan dinar, the same as at Goisava. It is possible that it is the grave of Duke Radič himself.

The area was neglected before protection process begun, covered with leaves and wild plants. The remains of the church walls and the stećaks in its interior are overgrown with moss and lichen. A large number of stećaks were moved from their original position, sank or slid down the slope.

== See also ==
- List of World Heritage Sites in Bosnia and Herzegovina

== Bibliography ==
- Šefik Bešlagić, STEĆCI – KULTURA I UMJETNOST; Veselin Masleša, Sarajevo, 1982.
- Marko Vego, Nadgrobni spomenici porodice Sankovića u selu Biskupu kod Konjica; Glasnik Zemaljskog muzeja u Sarajevu, XII, Sarajevo, 1957; pp. 127–141.
