= Dindo =

Dindo may refer to:

- Dindo Yogo, real name Théodore Dindo Mabeli (1955–2000), a Congolese singer and musician
- Rinaldo Capello (born 1964), also known as Dindo Capello, an Italian endurance racing driver
- Richard Dindo (1944–2025), a Swiss documentary film director
- Dindo Sicat, a character in Ang Tanging Pamilya: A Marry Go Round
- Typhoon Dindo (disambiguation), several tropical storms
- Dindo, Bosnia and Herzegovina, a village in the municipality of Konjic, Bosnia and Herzegovina
