= Krupac, Konjic =

Krupac Крупац
- Village
- Location within Bosnia and Herzegovina
- Coordinates: 43°29′46″N 18°06′47″E
- Country: Bosnia and Herzegovina
- Entity: Federation of Bosnia and Herzegovina
- Canton: Herzegovina-Neretva
- Municipality: Konjic

Area
  - Total: 3.93 sq mi (10.18 km^{2})

Population (2013)
  - Total: 54
  - Density: 14/sq mi (5.3/km^{2})
- Time zone: UTC+1 (CET)
  - Summer (DST): UTC+2 (CEST)

Krupac (Cyrillic: Крупац) is a settlement in the municipality of Konjic, Bosnia and Herzegovina, and the south-eastern hamlet of the village of Glavatičevo.

== Demographics ==
According to the 2013 census, its population was 54.

Ethnicity in 2013
Ethnicity	Number	Percentage
Bosniaks	52	96.3%
Croats	2	3.7%
Total	54	100%
