= Blatačko Lake =

Geographical object

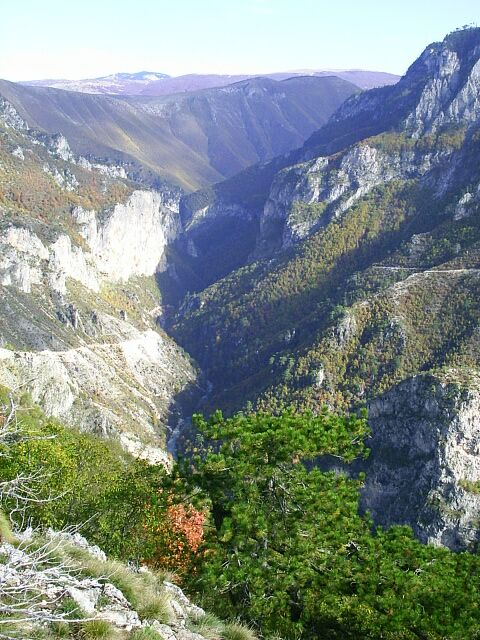
- Terrace, visible on the upper left in the distance, where Blace village is located & Blatačko Lake hanging above the precipice

- Location within Bosnia and Herzegovina
- Interactive map of Blatačko Lake
- Location: Herzegovina-Neretva Canton, Bosnia and Herzegovina
- Coordinates: 43.6236°N 18.1081°E
- Max. length: cca. 500 m (1,600 ft)
- Max. width: cca. 140 m (460 ft)
- Average depth: 2 m (6 ft 7 in)
- Surface elevation: 1,156 m (3,793 ft)

Blatačko lake and village of Blace, cultural landscape
- Interactive map of Blatačko lake and village of Blace, cultural landscape
- Location: Herzegovina-Neretva Canton, Bosnia and Herzegovina, Bosnia and Herzegovina
- Nearest town: Konjic
- Coordinates: 43°37′25″N 18°06′29″E
- Length: cca. m
- Width: cca. m
- Elevation: 1,215 m (3,986 ft)
- Designation

KONS of Bosnia and Herzegovina
- Official name: Blatačko lake with part of the Rakitnica River canyon, prehistoric burial mounds, necropolis with stećak and nišan tombstones, a village of Blace, cultural landscape
- Type: Category III monument
- Criteria: A, B, C i,iii.v., D i.iv, E iii.v., G i.ii.iv.vi.
- Designated: 9 September 2009 (?th kons session)
- Reference no.: 3267
- Decision no.: 02-2-40/09-52
- Established: 2009
- Visitors: Open all year (in Open all year)
- Operator: National monuments in Konjic - Cultural Landscape Blatačko Lake
- Owner: state
- Website: kons.gov.ba - KONS BiH

Blatačko Lake is a natural lake 21 kilometers to the north-east of Konjic, in Konjic municipality, Bosnia and Herzegovina. The lake is a central feature of the naturally, culturally and historically significant landscape designated as a National Monument of Bosnia and Herzegovina.

== Location and description ==
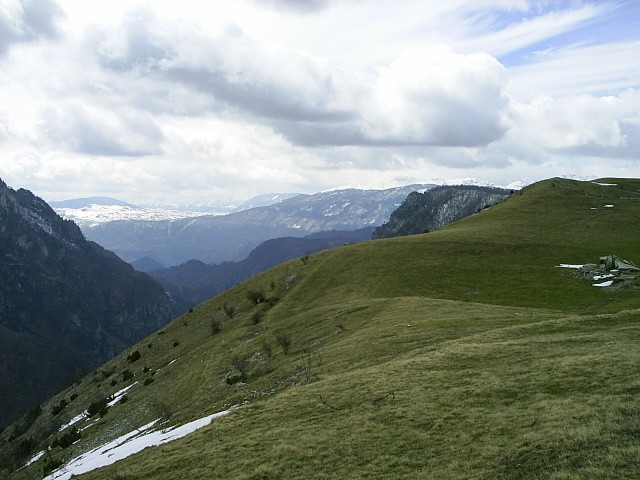
Terrace, hanging above the Rakitnica canyon precipice, where Blace village & Blatačko Lake is located (not visible, located beyond the right edge of the photo)

The lake is located in close proximity to Blace village (1,215 m) on a karstic plateau of the Bjelašnica mountain, on the very edge of the Rakitnica canyon, practically hanging over it at 1,156 meters a.s.l. It is oval shaped (sometimes described as rectangular), around 500 m long and 140 m wide. During the summer months it is up to 2 meters deep. It receives waters only through snow melting and rainfall since there is no open stream surface inflows. The outflow through sinkholes and underground toward the rive Rakitnica exists. It is possible that lake also receives some amount of inflow via underground springs, however, not enough to keep up with aquatic plants outgrow and progress of eutrophication.

== National monument ==
The natural position of the lake itself and the surrounding area has rich cultural and historical heritage, with prehistoric grave mounds and medieval necropolises with stećak and nišani tombstones in and around the village of Blace. They form one combined cultural landscape with part of the deep Rakitnica canyon, and are designated as a National Monument of Bosnia and Herzegovina.

=== Cultural-historical heritage ===
The protected perimeter of the monument consists of number of important sites:

- the Blatačko lake and its surrounding landscape with an area of 20 hectares including a part of the Rakitnica canyon,
- 4 prehistoric grave mounds and medieval necropolis consisting of 15 stećak tombstones at the location called "Kosan-krst",
- prehistoric grave mound and medieval necropolis with 12 stećak tombstones at the location called "Viš-stijena",
- prehistoric grave mound and medieval necropolis with 3 stećak tombstones at the location called "Babaluša",
- medieval necropolis with 8 stećak tombstones at the location called "Kod Čekića",
- prehistoric grave mound and 1 isolated medieval stećak at the location called "Komadinov Do",
- medieval necropolis with 7 stećak tombstones within active Orthodox cemetery,
- necropolis with 9 nišan tombstones since medieval times near "Komadinov Do".

=== Natural heritage ===
Species placed under the strict protection: Sesleria juncifolia, Sesleria coerulens, Festuca panciciana, Festuca bosniaca, Senecio bosniacus, Veronica satureoides, Gentiana dinarica, Gentiana symphyandra, Gentianella crispata, Endraianthus serpyllifolius, Saxifraga caryophylla, Minuartia clandestina, Silene pusilla, Alchemilla velebitica, Cerastium dinaricum.

Endemic alpine meadow species: Sesleria juncifolia, Sesleria coerulens, Festuca panciciana, Festuca bosniaca, Senecio bosniacus, Veronica satureioides, Gentiana dinarica, Gentiana symphyandra, Gentianella crispata.

Glacial relicts: Dryas octopetala, Polygonum viviparum, Gentiana kochiana, Nigritella nigra, Potentilla clusiana, Arnica montana, Jasione orbiculata, Achillea lingulata, Lilium bosniacum.

High alpine flora of the alpine pastures, rocky terrain and Rakitnica canyon: Plants found in the glacial cirques of Bjelašnica belong to the endemic association Amphoricarpion autariati and communities in the limestone canyon of the Rakitnica and on dolomitic soils, with following species of distinctive flora: Edraianthus serpyllifolius, Saxifraga caryophylla, Minuartia clandestina, Silene pusilla, Alchemilla velebitica, Cerastium dinaricum.

Species on limestone soils: Dripis linneana, Arabis alpina, Heracleum balcanicum, Stachys recta.

The ichthyofauna of the Tušilačka river and Rakitnica consists exclusively of salmonids.

Reptiles include the globally endangered meadow viper, Vipera ursini macrops, classified as endangered by IUCN, along with other vipers – V. berus bosniaca, V. amodites – and other snakes including Coronella austriaca, Coluber sp, the legless lizard Anguis fragilis, other lizard species – Lacerta vivipara, L. viridis, L. fragilis, L. Muralis – and frogs Hyla arborea and Rana agilis.

Invertebrates consist 127 recorded species of butterflies and moths (Lepidoptera) and 29 of grasshoppers (Orthoptera). There is also no fewer than 24 species recorded as endangered in Europe. Invertebrates classed as threatened in Europe, present in the Igman-Bjelašnica-Treskavica-Visočica area (also area proposed for ecological protection as National park):

- Threatened: Maculinea nausithous (butterfly), Maculinea teleius (butterfly), Apatura metis (butterfly);
- Vulnerable: Dolomedes plantarius (spider), Saga pedo (bush cricket), Hyles hippophaes (moth);
- Rare: Helix pomatia (gastropod - snail), Troglophantes gracilis (spider), Troglophantes similes (spider), Troglophantes spinipes (spider), Parnassius apollo (butterfly), Erebia ottomana (butterfly), Epimyrma ravouxi (ant);
- Insufficiently known: Microcondylae compressa (fresh water mussel), Unio elegantus (fresh water mussel), Hirudo medicinalis (leech), Leucorrhinia pectoralis (dragonfly), Myrmeleon formicarius (antlion), Syrichtus tesselum (butterfly), Papilio alexanor (butterfly), Zerynthia polyxena (butterfly), Erebia calcari (butterfly).

Birds include some 110 species, along with birds of prey such as the golden eagle (Aquila chrysaetos) and the short-toed snake eagle (Circaetus gallicus), the peregrine falcon (Falco peregrinus), the common kestrel (Falco tinninculus), the goshawk (Accipiter gentilis), the Eurasian sparrowhawk (Accipiter nisus) and the Levant sparrowhawk (Accipiter brevipes). One species on the 2006 IUCN Red List of Threatened Species, the globally vulnerable corn crake (Crex crex), is found in the area.

Mammals and larger mammals are: chamois (Rupicapra rupicapra balcanica), brown bear (Ursus arctos), the gray wolf (Canis lupus), the roe deer (Capreolus capreolus), wild boar (Sus scrofa), pine marten (Martes martes), which is already becoming much rarer, stoat (Mustela erminea), wild cat (Felis silvestris), lynx (Lynx lynx), and other 60 or more species.

== See also ==
- List of lakes in Bosnia and Herzegovina

== Sources ==
- "Blatačko lake with part of the Rakitnica River canyon, prehistoric burial mounds, necropolis with stećak and nišan tombstones, a village of Blace, cultural landscape". aplikacija.kons.gov.ba (in Serbo-Croatian and English). Commission to preserve national monuments. 2009.
