= Dužani =

Dužani Дужани
- Village
- Location within Bosnia and Herzegovina
- Coordinates: 43°31′N 18°09′E
- Country: Bosnia and Herzegovina
- Entity: Federation of Bosnia and Herzegovina
- Canton: Herzegovina-Neretva
- Municipality: Konjic

Area
  - Total: 2.13 sq mi (5.52 km^{2})

Population (2013)
  - Total: 25
  - Density: 12/sq mi (4.5/km^{2})
- Time zone: UTC+1 (CET)
  - Summer (DST): UTC+2 (CEST)

Dužani (Cyrillic: Дужани) is a village in the municipality of Konjic, Bosnia and Herzegovina.

== Demographics ==
According to the 2013 census, its population was 25, all Bosniaks.
