= Ljuta, Konjic =

Ljuta Љута
- Village
- Location within Bosnia and Herzegovina
- Coordinates: 43°34′43″N 18°18′19″E
- Country: Bosnia and Herzegovina
- Entity: Federation of Bosnia and Herzegovina
- Canton: Herzegovina-Neretva
- Municipality: Konjic

Area
  - Total: 2.96 sq mi (7.67 km^{2})

Population (2013)
  - Total: 32
  - Density: 11/sq mi (4.2/km^{2})
- Time zone: UTC+1 (CET)
  - Summer (DST): UTC+2 (CEST)

Ljuta (Serbian Cyrillic: Љута) is a village in the municipality of Konjic, Bosnia and Herzegovina.

== Demographics ==
According to the 2013 census, its population was 32.

Ethnicity in 2013
Ethnicity	Number	Percentage
Bosniaks	26	81.3%
Croats	4	12.5%
Serbs	2	6.3%
Total	32	100%
