= Glavatičevo Hydroelectric Power Station =

Proposed power plant in Bosnia and Herzegovina

Glavaticevo Hydro Power Plant
- Country: Bosnia and Herzegovina
- Location: Glavaticevo
- Coordinates: 43°30′12.91″N 18°6′17.25″E
- Status: Canceled

Thermal power station
- Primary fuel: Hydropower

Power generation
- Nameplate capacity: 172 MW

The Glavaticevo Hydro Power Plant was proposed but eventually canceled project in Bosnia and Herzegovina on the Neretva river. It was intended to be one of the largest hydro power plant in the country, with projected installed electric capacity of 172 MW. However, the project was under harsh scrutiny of local and national communities and various NGO's from Bosnia and Herzegovina and abroad, due which was postponed and probably canceled altogether. Nonetheless, although probably canceled it is still closely monitored by concerned parties, namely local and regional environmental and other NGO's.
