= Kašići =

Kašići Кашићи
- Village
- Location within Bosnia and Herzegovina
- Coordinates: 43.538785°N 18.075945°E
- Country: Bosnia and Herzegovina
- Entity: Federation of Bosnia and Herzegovina
- Canton: Herzegovina-Neretva
- Municipality: Konjic

Area
  - Total: 1.75 sq mi (4.54 km^{2})

Population (2013)
  - Total: 49
  - Density: 28/sq mi (11/km^{2})
- Time zone: UTC+1 (CET)
  - Summer (DST): UTC+2 (CEST)

Kašići (Cyrillic: Кашићи) is a settlement in the municipality of Konjic, Bosnia and Herzegovina, and the north-western hamlet of the village of Glavatičevo.

== Demographics ==
According to the 2013 census, its population was 49.

Ethnicity in 2013
Ethnicity	Number	Percentage
Bosniaks	45	91.8%
other/undeclared	4	8.2%
Total	49	100%
