= Šištica waterfall =

Šištica Waterfall
- Šištica
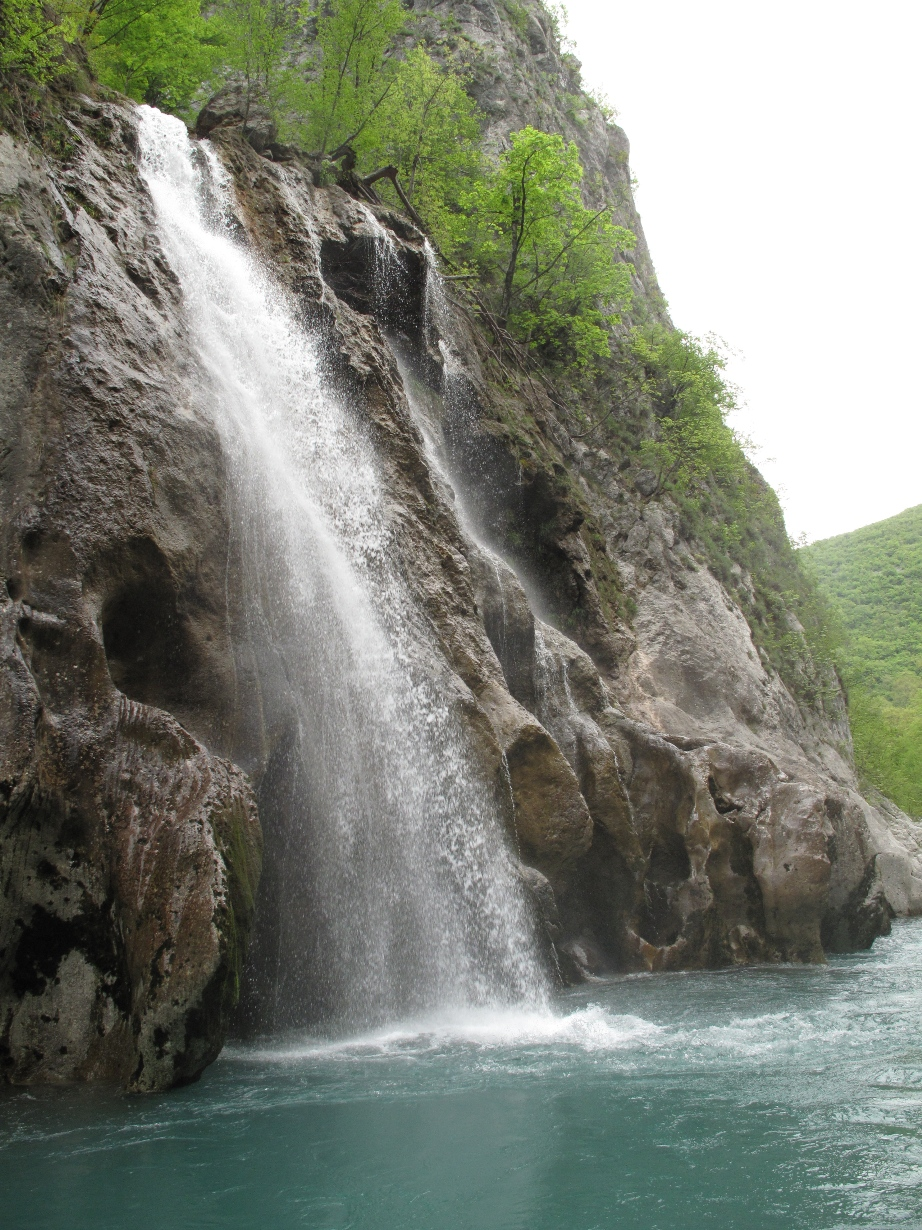
- Šištica waterfall
- Interactive map of Šištica Waterfall
- Location: Boračko jezero, Konjic, Bosnia and Herzegovina
- Coordinates: 43.545648°N 18.069247°E
- Type: Plunge
- Total height: 12 m (39 ft)
- Number of drops: 1
- Total width: 2–10 m (6 ft 7 in – 32 ft 10 in)
- Average width: 3 m (9.8 ft)
- Run: 1-2 meters
- Watercourse: Šištica river

The Šištica Waterfall is an ephemeral waterfall on the Šištica river, near the city of Konjic, Bosnia and Herzegovina. It is considered a natural and geomorphological rarity. The fall, when in flow, is located at the mouth of the river Šištica–the outflow of the Boračko lake–feeding directly into the Neretva.

This waterfall is about 12 meters high. The waters of the Boračko lake flow as the Šištica river from the left side into a narrow rocky gorge cut out through the karstic rock by the Neretva.

It is a geomorphological monument of nature of Bosnia and Herzegovina.

See also

*List of waterfalls in Bosnia and Herzegovina
