= Razići =

Razići Разићи
- Village
- Location within Bosnia and Herzegovina
- Coordinates: 43.512208°N 18.114443°E
- Country: Bosnia and Herzegovina
- Entity: Federation of Bosnia and Herzegovina
- Canton: Herzegovina-Neretva
- Municipality: Konjic

Area
  - Total: 7.73 sq mi (20.03 km^{2})

Population (2013)
  - Total: 59
  - Density: 7.6/sq mi (2.9/km^{2})
- Time zone: UTC+1 (CET)
  - Summer (DST): UTC+2 (CEST)

Razići (Cyrillic: Разићи) is a settlement in the municipality of Konjic, Bosnia and Herzegovina, and the northern hamlet of the village of Glavatičevo.

== Demographics ==
According to the 2013 census, its population was 59.

1. Bosniaks - 57 (96.6%)
2. Serbs - 2 (3.40%)
Total: 59
