= Dindo, Konjic =

Dindo Dindol
- Village
- Location within Bosnia and Herzegovina
- Coordinates: 43.512778°N 18.302500°E
- Country: Bosnia and Herzegovina
- Entity: Federation of Bosnia and Herzegovina
- Elevation: 2,300 ft (700 m)
- Time zone: UTC+1 (CET)
  - Summer (DST): UTC+2 (CEST)

Dindo is a village in the municipality of Konjic, in the Federation of Bosnia and Herzegovina entity of Bosnia and Herzegovina.

Dindo is located in a mountainous rural area in the south-eastern part of Konjic Municipality on the border with Kalinovik Municipality, which also marks the Inter-Entity Boundary Line (IEBL) between the two constituent entities of Bosnia and Herzegovina, FB&H and RS.

A bridge carrying an important road across the Ljuta, a right tributary of the Neretva, was destroyed in 1995 during the last days of the Bosnian War before the signing of the Dayton Agreement.

The destroyed bridge was replaced with a Bailey bridge in 2002. The work was undertaken by a Spanish Engineering Unit of SFOR based in Mostar. As well as restoring road communications the replacement of the bridge was intended to make it easier for displaced persons to return to their pre-war homes, to support agriculture and to contribute to economic prosperity in the region, encouraging trade between the two entities.
