= Lađanica =

Lađanica Лађаница
- Village
- Location within Bosnia and Herzegovina
- Coordinates: 43°29′52″N 18°08′27″E
- Country: Bosnia and Herzegovina
- Entity: Federation of Bosnia and Herzegovina
- Canton: Herzegovina-Neretva
- Municipality: Konjic

Area
  - Total: 2.02 sq mi (5.23 km^{2})

Population (2013)
  - Total: 47
  - Density: 23/sq mi (9.0/km^{2})
- Time zone: UTC+1 (CET)
  - Summer (DST): UTC+2 (CEST)

Lađanica (Cyrillic: Лађаница) is a settlement in the municipality of Konjic, Bosnia and Herzegovina; it is the eastern hamlet of the village of Glavatičevo.

== Demographics ==
According to the 2013 census, its population was 47, all Bosniaks.
