= Grušča =

Grušča Грушча
- Village
- Location within Bosnia and Herzegovina
- Coordinates: 43°33′55″N 18°06′24″E
- Country: Bosnia and Herzegovina
- Entity: Federation of Bosnia and Herzegovina
- Canton: Herzegovina-Neretva
- Municipality: Konjic

Area
  - Total: 11.08 sq mi (28.69 km^{2})

Population (2013)
  - Total: 109
  - Density: 9.84/sq mi (3.80/km^{2})
- Time zone: UTC+1 (CET)
  - Summer (DST): UTC+2 (CEST)

Grušča (Cyrillic: Грушча) is a village in the municipality of Konjic, Bosnia and Herzegovina.

== Demographics ==
According to the 2013 census, its population was 109, all Bosniaks.
