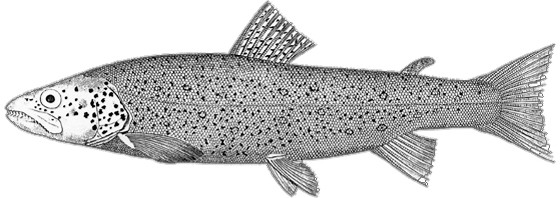

Conservation status
- Data Deficient (IUCN 3.1)

Scientific classification
- Kingdom: Animalia
- Phylum: Chordata
- Class: Actinopterygii
- Division: Teleostei
- Order: Salmoniformes
- Family: Salmonidae
- Genus: Salmo
- Species: S. dentex

Binomial name
- Salmo dentex (Heckel, 1852)

= Salmo dentex =

Species of fish

Salmo dentex is a variety of trout, a freshwater fish in the family Salmonidae, found in the western Balkans. Until recently the identity, biological distinctness and species status of the dentex trout were not properly clarified, but genetic data now suggest it is not a monophyletic unit that could be distinguished from other salmonids as a separate species.

Salmo dentex has been reported to inhabit the Neretva river and Hutovo Blato wetlands in Bosnia and Herzegovina, and is also found in Albania and Montenegro in Lake Skadar and its tributaries. It is reported that S. dentex is extinct from Croatian rivers, Cetina and Krka, but has recently been reported by anglers from the Cetina river in Croatia. Some reports indicate its presence in the rivers of Livanjsko field in Bosnia and Herzegovina and in river Alfeios in Greece.

The status of S. dentex, locally known as the zubatak, long remained unclear due to lack of samples for detailed analyses, hybridisation with other trout lineages and diverse and multiple designations of the same trout in different areas. One of the inhabited areas, the Hutovo Blato wetlands, is situated North West of the Neretva river estuary in southern part of Bosnia and Herzegovina. This is an atypical type of wetland, characterized by several shallow lakes and channels filled with clear and cold water (around 13 °C (55 °F) whole year) creating conditions suitable also for salmonids.

Recently the genetic structure of S. dentex and its relations to other co-existing salmonids in the Neretva and Skadar river systems have been studied using mitochondrial DNA, microsatellite and 21 other nuclear DNA loci. Genetic analyses showed that the Neretva S. dentex ("zubatak") and the co-existing marble trout (S. marmoratus) formed a genetically unified cluster, while Skadar S. dentex ("strun") was "genetically distinct from S. marmoratus in the same river system and indistinct from local brown trout (S. trutta)". Thus the Neretva and Skadar S. dentex are not closely related but rather "S. dentex [is] a particular life history form of S. marmoratus in the Neretva basin and of S. trutta in the Skadar basin". "These results clearly demonstrate that S. dentex does not represent a monophyletic lineage and should not be considered a distinct species."
