= Ulog =

Ulog Улог
- Village
- Interactive map of Ulog
- Location within Bosnia and Herzegovina
- Coordinates: 43°25′00″N 18°18′33″E
- Country: Bosnia and Herzegovina
- Entity: Republika Srpska
- Municipality: Kalinovik
- Time zone: UTC+1 (CET)
  - Summer (DST): UTC+2 (CEST)

Ulog (Serbian Cyrillic: Улог) is a village in the municipality of Kalinovik, Republika Srpska, Bosnia and Herzegovina.
