= Rakitnica (Neretva) =

River in Bosnia and Herzegovina

Rakitnica Ракитница
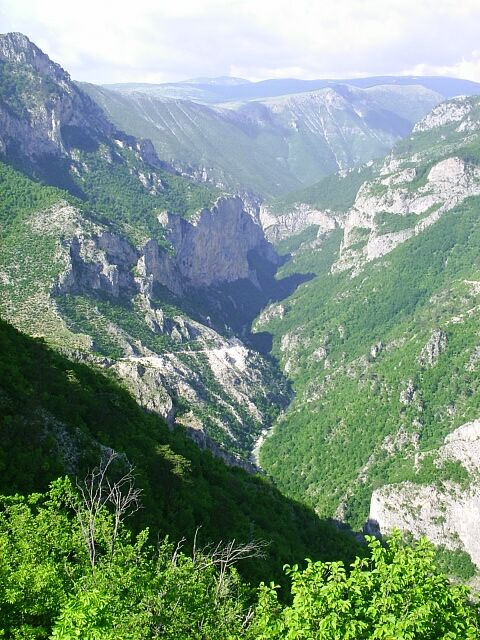
- Upstream view on the Rakitnica river, squeezed in a deep narrow canyon between Bjelašnica (on the left) and Visočica (on the right).

- Location within Bosnia and Herzegovina

Location
- Country: Bosnia and Herzegovina

Physical characteristics
- Source: Zucina Vrela
  - location: Above Rakitnica village under the northwestern ridge of Treskavica mountain.
  - coordinates: 43.634420°N 18.317633°E
  - elevation: 1,270 m (4,170 ft)
- 2nd source: Confluence of Crna Rijeka & Glibovac
  - location: 2 kilometers downstream of Zucina Vrela
  - coordinates: 43.6430165°N 18.2998538°E
  - elevation: 1,200 m (3,900 ft)
- Mouth
  - location: The Neretva river between Glavatičevo and Konjic
  - coordinates: 43.5544°N 18.0700°E
  - elevation: 323 m (1,060 ft)
- Length: 33 km (21 mi)

Basin features
- Progression: Neretva→ Adriatic Sea
- Landmarks: Lukomir, Stećak's UNESCO World Heritage Site
- Tributaries
  - left: Glibovac, Pijevac, Velaškovac, Tušilska Rijeka, Međeđa, Grušćanska Rijeka
  - right: Veliki Do, Lađevac, Kolijevka, Potoci, Zapolje, Šklope, Studenac
- Waterbodies: Blatačko Lake
- Waterfalls: Peruće

Rakitnica (Serbian Cyrillic: Ракитница) is the main tributary of the first section of the Neretva river, also called Upper Neretva (Bosnian: Gornja Neretva). It meets Neretva from the right, flowing from north to south, between Bjelašnica and Visočica mountains.

== Geography ==
The Rakitnica river begins as Crna Rijeka (English = Black River) from "Zucina Vrela" (English = "Zuco's Wellsprings") that emerges in the areal above Rakitnica village under the northwestern ridge of Treskavica mountain, and after a short run, cca. 2 kilometers, and confluence with Glibovac creek it becomes Rakitnica. The Rakitnica river forms a 26 km long canyon, on its 33 km long stretch, carved between Bjelašnica and Visočica, southeast from Sarajevo.

== Protection ==
Bosnia and Herzegovina on several occasions, since 1998, was preparing to establish a large national park which, according to developed but never operationalized plans, would comprise the entire region of Gornja Neretva (English: Upper Neretva), including the Rakitnica river. However parts of the river course and canyon features are designated Nature Monument of Bosnia and Herzegovina.

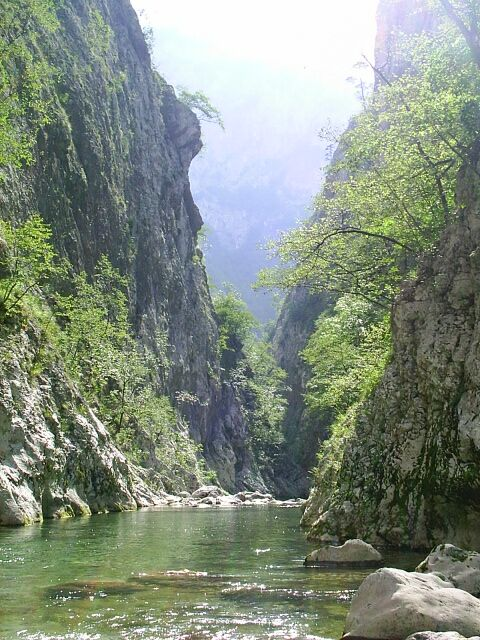
Approach to a narrowest point in the Rakitnica canyon, called Džehenem (Hell)
