= Dudle =

Dudle Дудле
- Village
- Location within Bosnia and Herzegovina
- Coordinates: 43°32′N 18°07′E
- Country: Bosnia and Herzegovina
- Entity: Federation of Bosnia and Herzegovina
- Canton: Herzegovina-Neretva
- Municipality: Konjic

Area
  - Total: 1.56 sq mi (4.03 km^{2})

Population (2013)
  - Total: 23
  - Density: 15/sq mi (5.7/km^{2})
- Time zone: UTC+1 (CET)
  - Summer (DST): UTC+2 (CEST)

Dudle (Cyrillic: Дудле) is a village in the municipality of Konjic, Bosnia and Herzegovina.

== Demographics ==
According to the 2013 census, its population was 23, all Bosniaks.
