= Lukomir =

Village in Bosnia and Herzegovina

Lukomir Лукомир
- Village
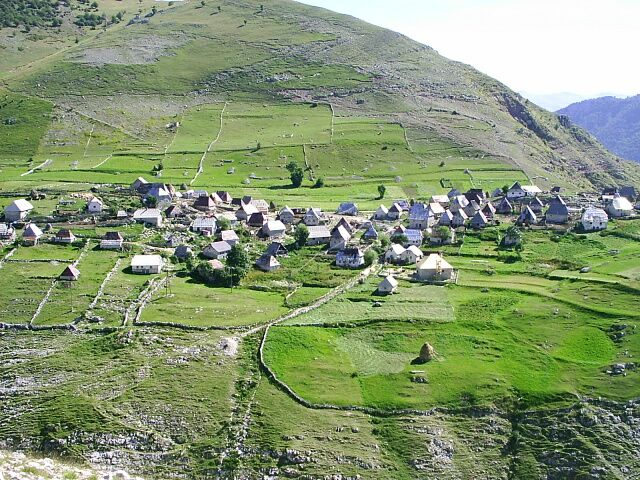

- Location within Bosnia and Herzegovina
- Coordinates: 43°38′N 18°11′E
- Country: Bosnia and Herzegovina
- Entity: Federation of Bosnia and Herzegovina
- Canton: Herzegovina-Neretva
- Municipality: Konjic

Area
  - Total: 26.03 km^{2} (10.05 sq mi)
- Elevation: 1,495 m (4,905 ft)

Population (2013)
  - Total: 13
  - Density: 0.50/km^{2} (1.3/sq mi)
- Time zone: UTC+01:00 (CET)
  - Summer (DST): UTC+02:00 (CEST)

Lukomir (Serbian Cyrillic: Лукомир) is a village in the municipality of Konjic, in Bosnia and Herzegovina. It consists of two settlements, Donji (Lower) and Gornji (Upper) Lukomir. Located on Bjelašnica mountain, it is the highest village in the country, at a maximum altitude of 1,495 m (4,905 ft). As of the 2013 census, there were 13 permanent residents in Lukomir, but 17 families return to the village every summer from nearby settlements.

== Geography and architecture ==
Lukomir is the highest and most remote village in Bosnia and Herzegovina. It sits at an altitude of 1,495 m (4,905 ft) on Bjelašnica mountain, approximately 50 kilometres (31 mi) from the national capital Sarajevo. Stećci originating from the 14th and 15th centuries can be found in the village and suggest that it has been inhabited for hundreds of years. The walls of the homes in the area are made of stone and their roofs of wooden tiles. The Rakitnica canyon is located nearby and is said by local folklore to be the origin of a dragon.

== Administration ==
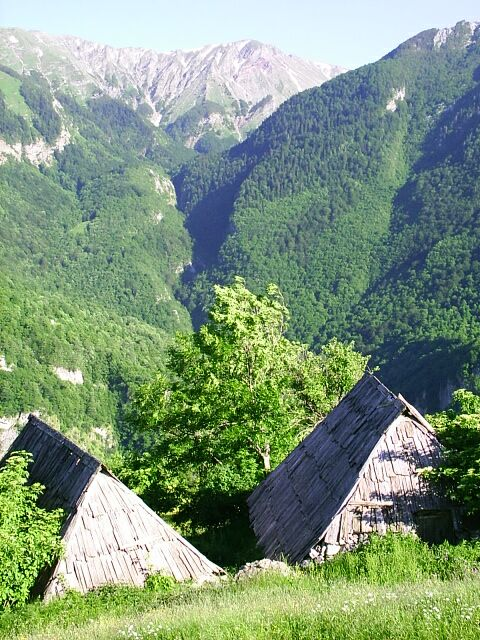
Donji Lukomir (Lower Lukomir), situated about 1,000 m (3,300 ft) above sea level

The village of Lukomir is split into two settlements: Donji (Lower) and Gornji (Upper) Lukomir. Gornji Lukomir is the main settlement, while Donji Lukomir is a satellite settlement situated some 500 m (1,600 ft) below Gornji Lukomir, on the steep slopes of the Rakitnica canyon.

== Demographics ==
The 2013 census recorded a permanent population of 13 in Lukomir, all of whom were Bosniaks. During the summer, 17 families return to the village from neighbouring towns and cities.

== Recognition ==
Considered significant in terms of the quality of its natural and cultural-historical landscape, Lukomir and its immediate surrounding area are designated as a National Monument of Bosnia and Herzegovina by the government.

== In popular culture ==
Lukomir has been the backdrop of two films. The 1990 Yugoslav film Gluvi Barut (Silent Gunpowder) was filmed in Lukomir and the surrounding Bjelašnica mountain area. The village also appears in the 2013 film Killing Season as the birthplace of the protagonist Emil Kovač (played by John Travolta).

Filmmaker Niels van Koevorden directed a 2010 documentary on the village titled Lukomir – Six Months Off (Dutch: Winterslaap in Lukomir). It was screened at the Netherlands Film Festival and later won the 2010 Documentary Award from Dutch broadcaster VPRO.

The music video for the single "Dođi" (Come) by Bosnian singer-songwriter Dino Merlin and Slovenian singer-songwriter Senidah was filmed in the village in 2020.
