= Lebršnik =

Mountain in Gacko, Bosnia and Herzegovina

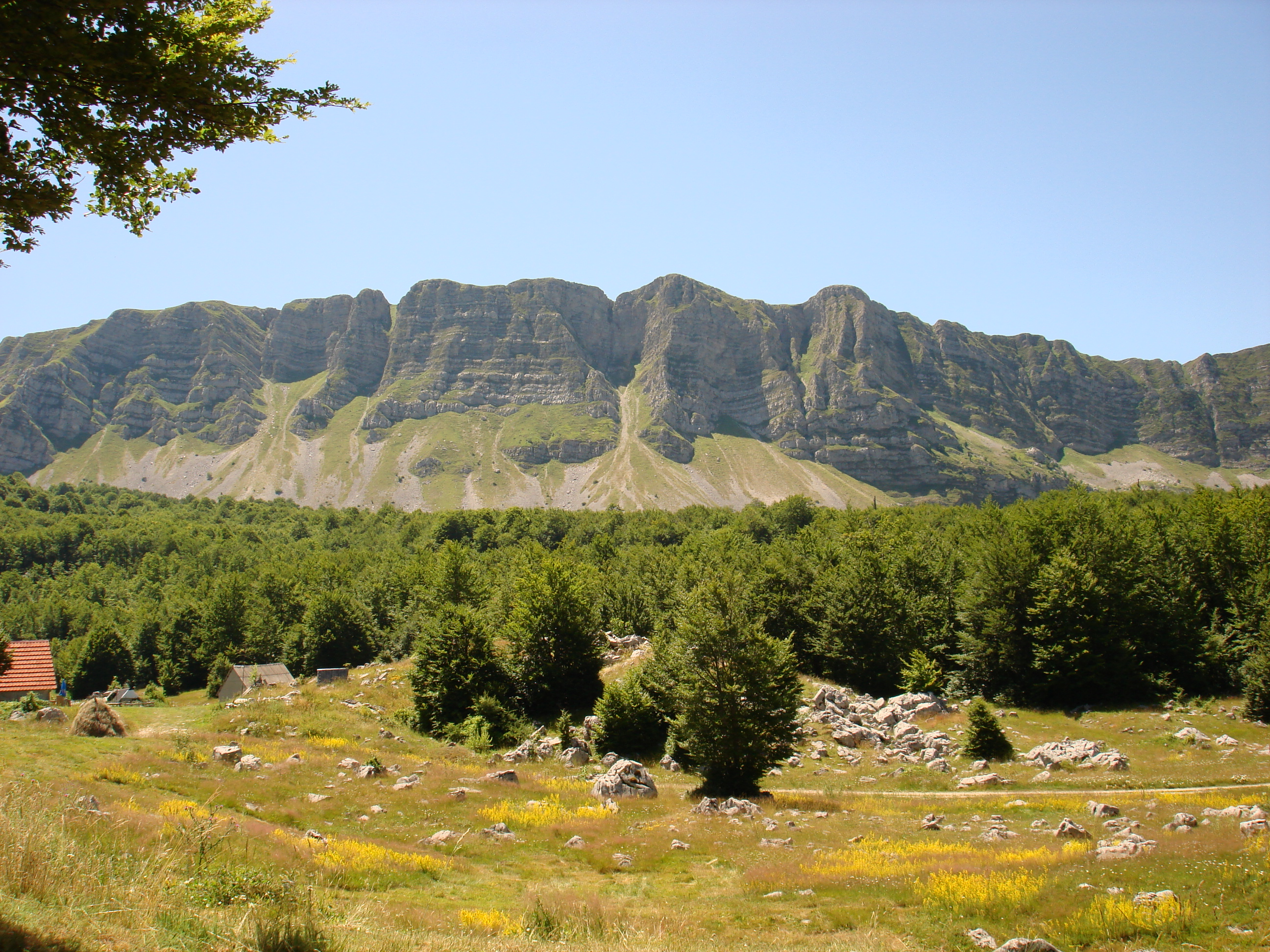
- View on the Lebršnik from the village Izgori

Highest point
- Elevation: 1,985 m (6,512 ft)
- Coordinates: 43°12′07″N 18°38′16″E

Geography
- Location within Bosnia and Herzegovina
- Location: Bosnia and Herzegovina – Montenegro
- Parent range: Dinaric Alps

Lebršnik (Serbian Cyrillic: Лебршник) is a mountain in the municipality of Gacko, East Herzegovina, at the border of Bosnia and Herzegovina and Montenegro. It has an altitude of 1,985 metres (6,512 ft).

== See also ==
- List of mountains in Bosnia and Herzegovina
