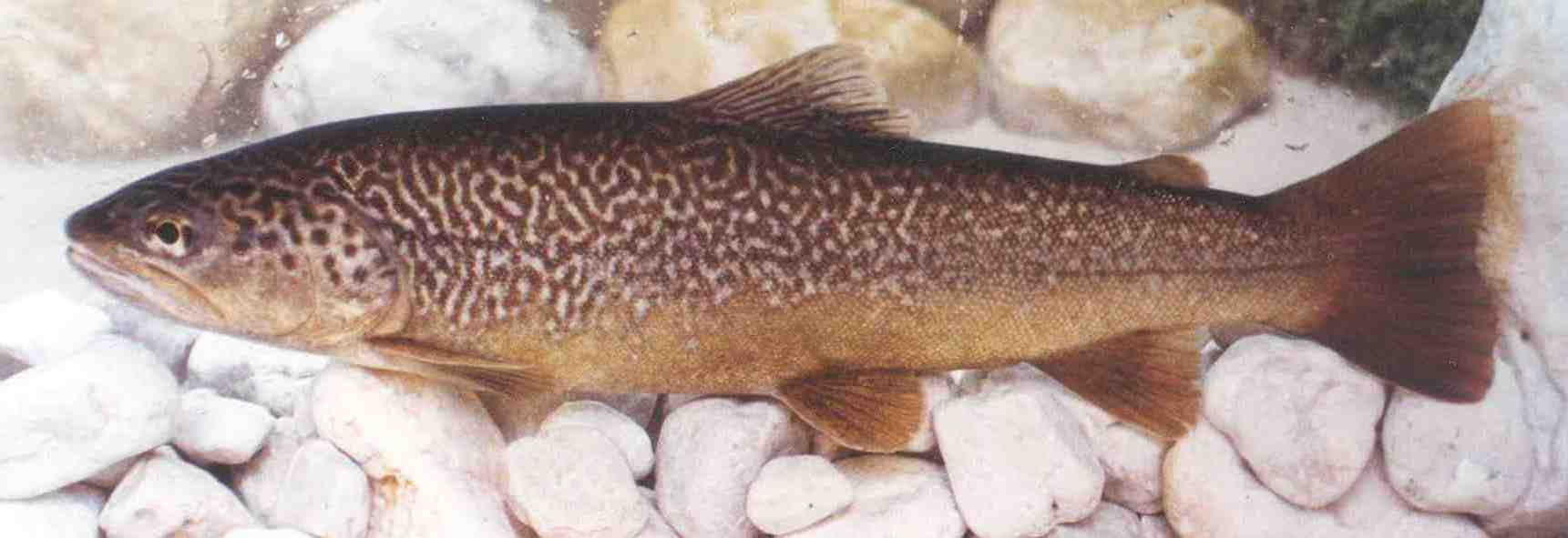

Conservation status
- Vulnerable (IUCN 3.1)

Scientific classification
- Kingdom: Animalia
- Phylum: Chordata
- Class: Actinopterygii
- Order: Salmoniformes
- Family: Salmonidae
- Genus: Salmo
- Species: S. marmoratus

Binomial name
- Salmo marmoratus G. Cuvier, 1829
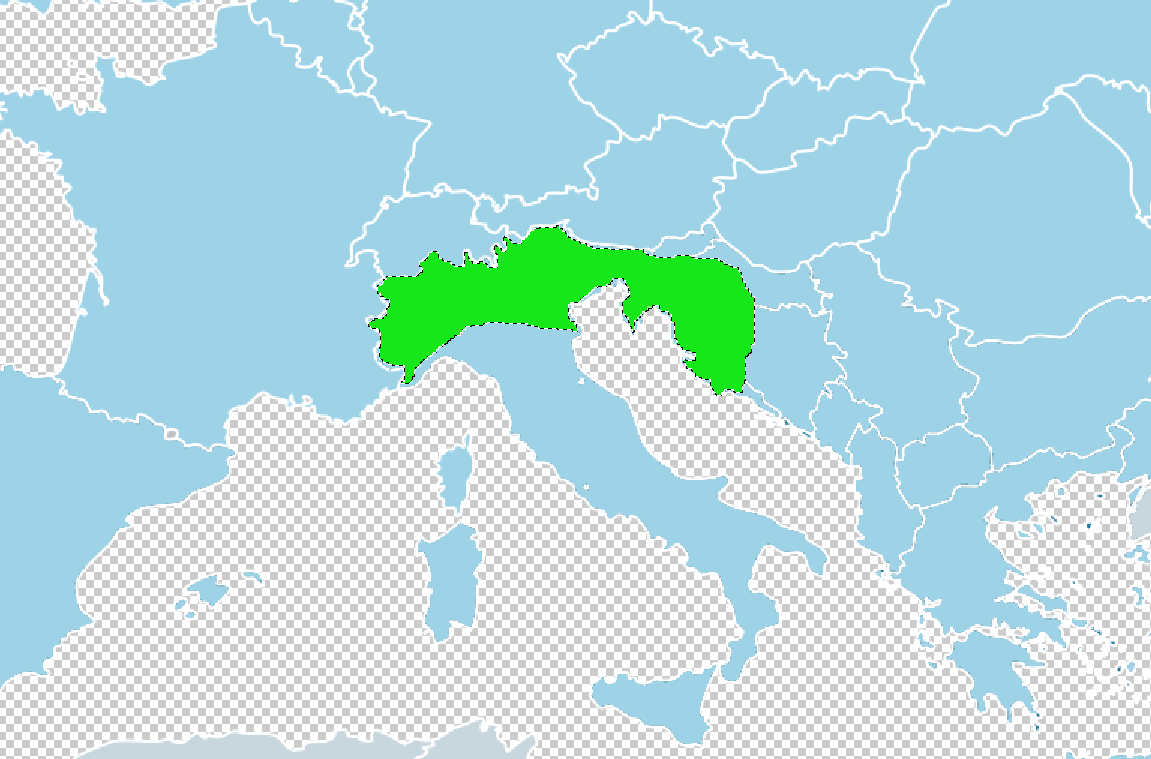

= Salmo marmoratus =

Species of fish

Salmo marmoratus, the marble trout, is a species of freshwater fish in the family Salmonidae. It is characterized by a distinctive marbled color pattern and high growth capacity. The marble trout is found in only a handful of drainages and rivers of the Adriatic basin in (going from north to south) Italy, Slovenia, Croatia, Bosnia and Herzegovina, and Montenegro, while in Albania, the species is considered most likely extirpated.

== Distribution ==
In Italy, marble trout inhabits left tributaries of the upper northwestern reaches of the Po River, and Italian northeastern sub-Alpine region's direct Adriatic watersheds, namely the Adige, the Brenta, the Piave, the Tagliamento, and the Livenza; in shared Slovenia and Italy drainage of the Soča with Natisone; in shared Bosnia and Herzegovina and Croatia drainage of the Neretva river, and in shared Montenegro and Albania drainage of the Morača with Zeta river, and the tributary Cem (Cijevna). While once present in the Drin river basin in Albania, with White Drin in Kosovo and Black Drin in North Macedonia and Albania (as well as the Zalli i Bulqizes and the Okshtuni tributaries), and the Aoos river basin in Albania and Greece (as well as the Sarantaporos and the Drino tributaries), the fish is almost certainly extirpated there.

== Appearance, biology, and ecology ==
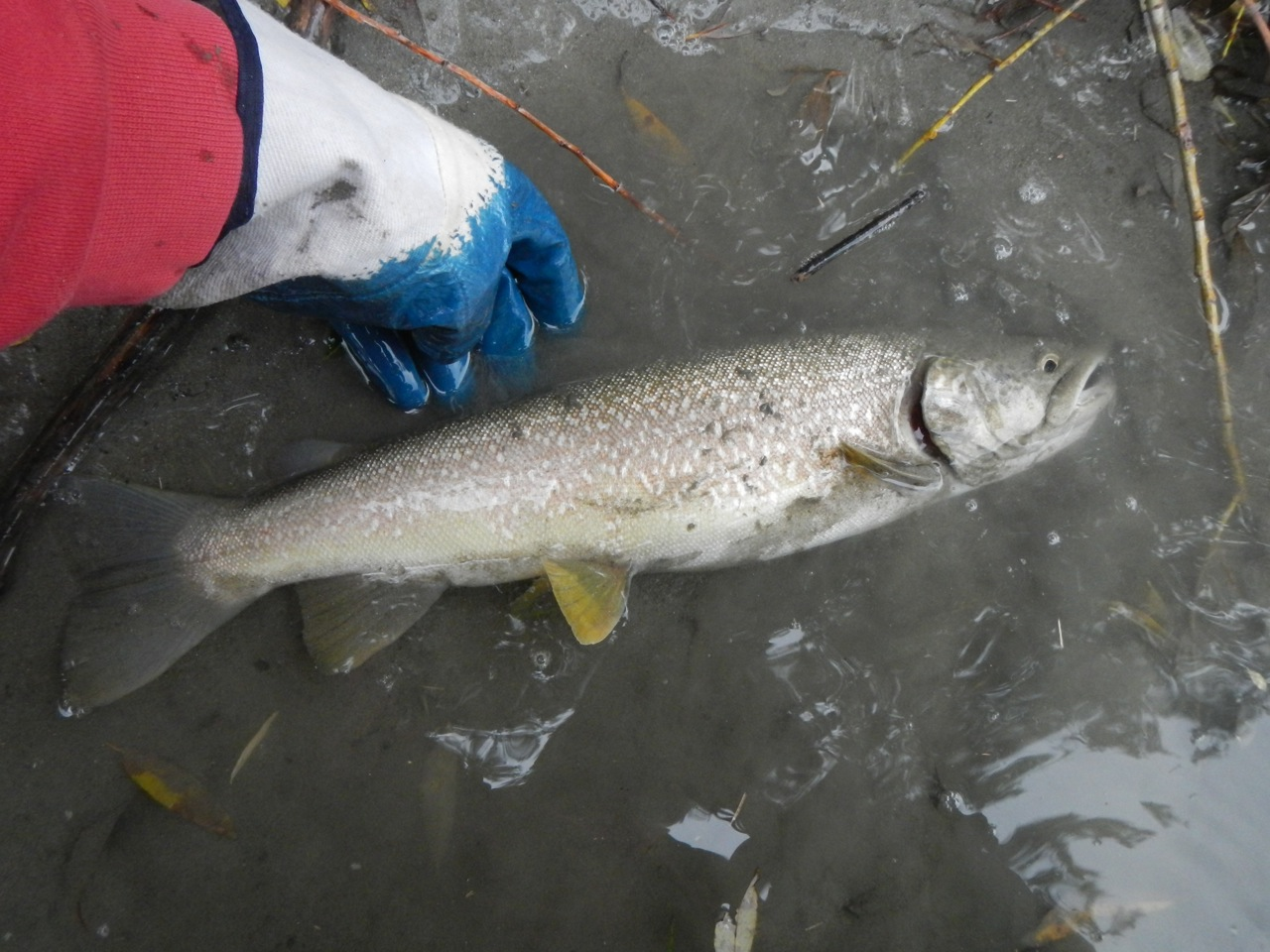

The marble trout has a long, cylindrical body, slightly compressed laterally, with a large head (22–25% of the body length), which is why it is also known as glavatica (glava = head) in Bosnian. The most obvious characteristic of the marble trout is its marble pattern. The intensity of colour varies considerably upon the surroundings. Some marble trout have red spots that merge with the rest of the pigment, always only along the lateral line.

Its typical size is 30–70 cm (12–28 in). The largest specimen in Slovenia was a 117 cm (46 in), 24 kg (52 lb 15 oz) female (found dead), largest living specimen caught was 120 cm (47 in) and 22.5 kg (49 lb 10 oz). Individuals weighing up to 30 kg (66 lb) have been reported. The largest specimens were found in Bosnia and Herzegovina, inhabiting the Neretva River from below town of Konjic downstream to town of Čapljina, mostly in canyon section from town of Jablanica to city of Mostar, and later after construction of Jablanica Dam on the Neretva River in Jablaničko Lake. Trout become sexually mature at the age 3+ years (males) and 4+ years (females), and they spawn during November and December.

The marble trout is piscivorous, feed mainly on smaller fish and benthic invertebrates.

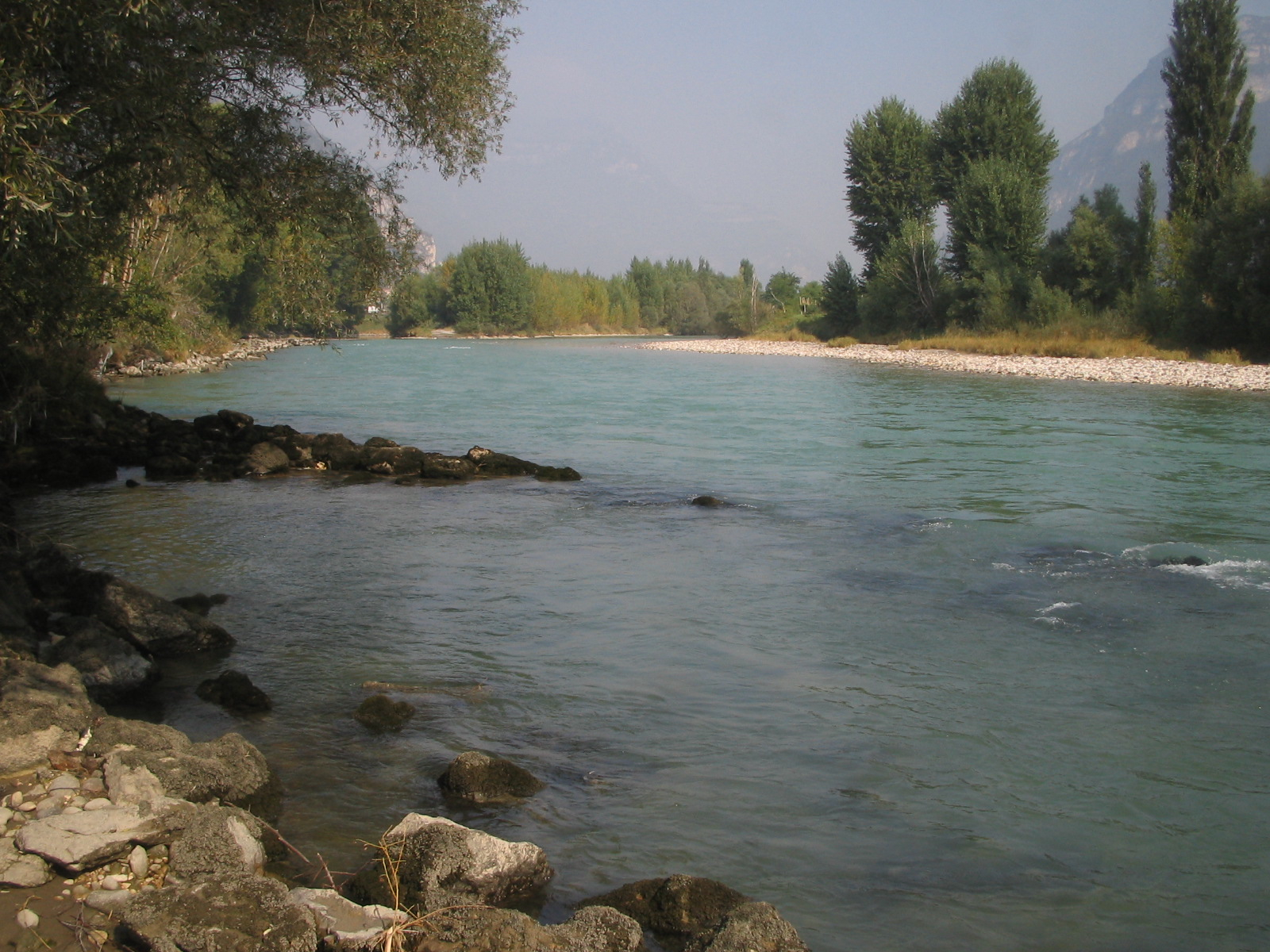
Adige River in Vallagarina

Its natural habitat is rivers with a summer temperature of 15 °C (59 °F). It suffers numerous threats to its existence throughout its range, these include hybridisation with foreign trout species stocked for angling, water extraction, and pollution. In Bosnia and Herzegovina, its main threats are habitat loss (habitat destruction) due to construction of five large dams on the Neretva River and plans for construction of several new dams on the upper course of the Neretva, water pollution, overfishing (sportfishing, food, including poaching), and hybridisation with introduced species of trout.

An anadromous form Salmo marmoratus f. marinus has been proposed, that would have a biological adaptation to high salinity waters. The capture of a 95.5 cm (37.6 in), 10.220 kg (22 lb 8.5 oz) specimen from the Eastern Adriatic Sea off Igrane by a commercial spearfisher supports this hypothesis.

All eight remaining genetically pure marble trout populations were found in remote streams of the River Soča basin. From these populations the Tolmin Angler's Society launched a reintroduction programme.

== Marmorated trout ==
Adding to the confusion of salmonid taxonomy, other trout have marble patterns beside S. marmoratus. One is trout from the river Otra, Norway. A certain percentage of brown trout (Salmo trutta) from that river have a marble pattern. In all other aspects, these trout are identical to the nonmarble brown trout from the same river. This is an example of intrapopulational polymorphism.
