= Boračko jezero =

Lake in Bosnia and Herzegovina

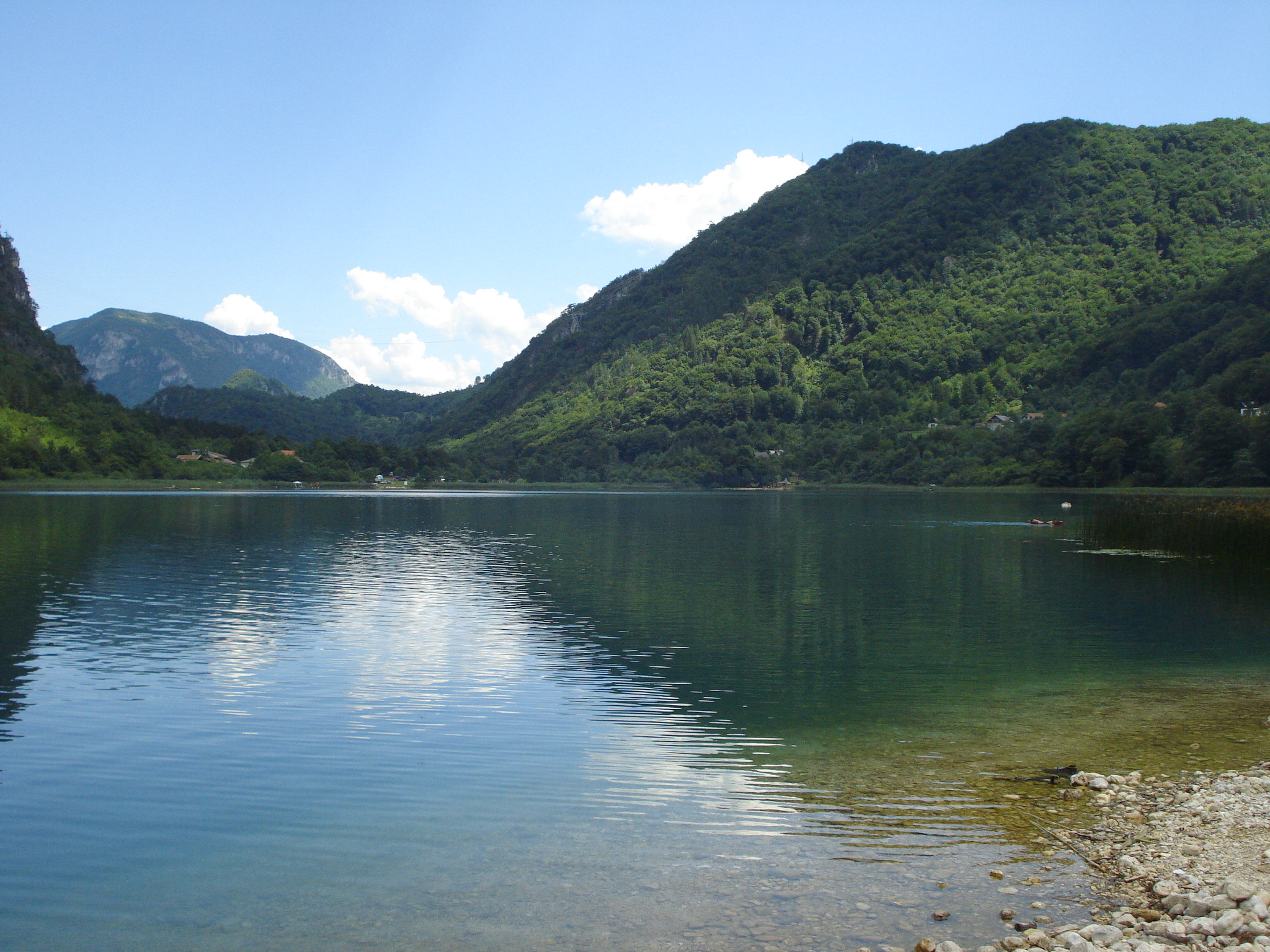
- Boračko jezero at Borci

- Location within Bosnia and Herzegovina
- Interactive map of Boračko jezero
- Location: Konjic, Bosnia and Herzegovina
- Coordinates: 43.551944°N 18.031389°E
- Primary inflows: Borački potok
- Primary outflows: Šištica River (tributary of Neretva river)
- Catchment area: 2.600 m^{2} (27.99 sq ft)
- Basin countries: Bosnia and Herzegovina
- Max. length: 786 m (0.488 mi)
- Max. width: 402 m (1,319 ft)
- Surface area: 0.26 km^{2} (0.10 sq mi)
- Average depth: 1 m (3.3 ft)
- Max. depth: 17 m (56 ft)
- Water volume: 2.500 m^{3} (88.3 cu ft)
- Surface elevation: 397 m (1,302 ft)
- Islands: None
- Settlements: Borci

Boračko jezero is glacial lake is situated in Konjic Municipality, Bosnia and Herzegovina. It lies at the northeastern foot of the mountain Prenj, at an altitude 397 m. From the west it is surrounded by steep forested mountain slopes of Crna Gora (Black Mountain, 1343 m), and from the east by Tranjine (1055 m). The lake basin was created in the Boračka draga, during the expansive process of glacial erosion.

Boračko jezero has an elliptical shape. Its length is 786 meters, and the maximum width is 402 meters. Its surface area is 0.26 square kilometers. Length of the lake shore is 2.4 km. The lake is the deepest in the southeastern narrow part of about 17 m, and contains about 2.5 mil.m³ water, which is due to the greenish color is transparent and up to 8.3 m. The water is warmest in August (about 25 °C), the coldest in February (0 °C).

== See also ==
- Neretva
- Konjic
- Prenj
- List of lakes in Bosnia and Herzegovina

== Bibliography ==
- Guber, Mihovil (1943). "Pustošenje planinarskih objekata u južnoj Hrvatskoj" [The Desolation of Mountain Objects in Southern Croatia] (PDF). Hrvatski planinar (in Croatian). Vol. 39, no. 6–7. pp. 85–93. ISSN 0354-0650.
