= Treskavica =

Mountain range in Bosnia and Herzegovina

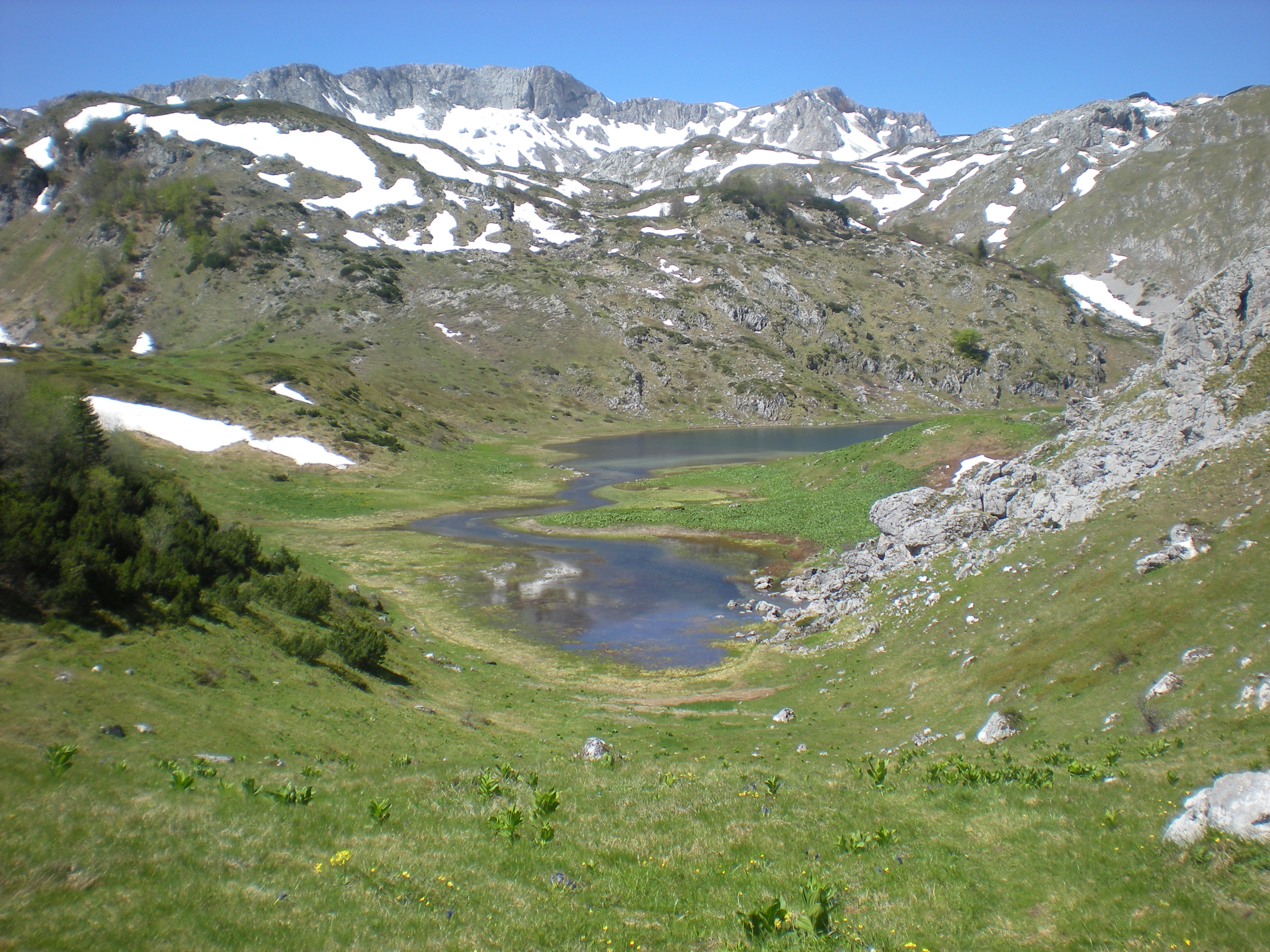
- Veliko Jezero and Treskavica main ridge

Highest point
- Elevation: 2,088 m (6,850 ft)
- Coordinates: 43.5960573°N 18.3469105°E

Geography
- Location within Bosnia and Herzegovina
- Location: Bosnia and Herzegovina
- Topo map: yes

Climbing
- Easiest route: from Trnovo via Turovi and Sustavac P.D. proceeding to Veliko Jezero. From there strictly following the markings towards Đokin Toranj (mine hazard!).

Treskavica (Serbian Cyrillic: Трескавица) is a mountain range in Bosnia and Herzegovina, situated in Trnovo municipality just south of city of Sarajevo. Mala Ćaba (Đokin Toranj) peak at 2088 m (6850 ft.), which makes Treskavica the tallest of all the mountains circling Sarajevo, and only some 300 m shorter than the tallest mountain in the country. On clear days with good weather, climbers can see far into the distance, up to Montenegro and the Adriatic Sea.

== Topography ==
Geologically, the Treskavica range is part of the Dinaric Alps and formed largely of secondary and tertiary sedimentary rock, mostly limestone and dolomite. A number of beautiful mountain lakes are scattered throughout the group, of which Veliko Jezero is the largest. A number of streams source from these mountains: the Bistrica tributary of the Drina river, the Željeznica tributary of the Bosna river, Ljuta and Rakitnica tributaries of the Neretva. Notable peaks are Đokin Toranj (2088 m.), Pašina Planina (2070 m.), Mali Treskač (1950 m.) and Lupoč (1773 m.).

== History ==
During the Bosnian War, the Treskavica mountains were part of the frontline between both ARBiH and VRS, which saw intense combat. Numerous battles were fought within these mountains over the possession of the small town of Trnovo, which would allow access to the Goražde enclave and the staging point for the Siege of Sarajevo.

Nowadays, the borderline between the two entities of Bosnia and Herzegovina runs parallel to the former lines diagonally through Treskavica, dividing the south-eastern part of the mountain range towards the territory of the Republika Srpska whereas the north-western part belongs to the Federation of Bosnia and Herzegovina.

Although contamination with land mines and unexploded ordnance still pose a serious threat throughout the area, hiking and tourism have picked up during the last couple of years, and some mountain huts have re-opened (Sustavac, and Turnovi Stan).

The main peak of Mala Ćaba is generally known as Đokin Toranj because of a view tower that used to stand on its summit, but has been destroyed and removed during the war. A marked itinerary, leading from Veliko Jezero to the top was re-established in 2010.

== Bibliography ==
=== Alpinism ===
- Poljak, Željko (February 1959). "Treskavica". Kazalo za "Hrvatski planinar" i "Naše planine" 1898—1958 (PDF). Naše planine (in Croatian). Vol. XI. pp. 22–23. ISSN 0354-0650.
- Guber, Mihovil (1943). "Pustošenje planinarskih objekata u južnoj Hrvatskoj" [The Desolation of Mountain Objects in Southern Croatia] (PDF). Hrvatski planinar (in Croatian). Vol. 39, no. 6–7. pp. 85–93. ISSN 0354-0650.

=== Biology ===
- Šašić, Martina; Nahirnić, Ana; Tarmann, Gerhard M. (2016-12-31). "Zygaenidae (Lepidoptera) in the Lepidoptera collections of the Croatian Natural History Museum". Natura Croatica: Periodicum Musei Historiae Naturalis Croatici. 25 (2): 233–248. doi:10.20302/NC.2016.25.19. eISSN 1848-7386.
