= Visočica (mountain) =

Mountain range in Bosnia and Herzegovina

- Височица
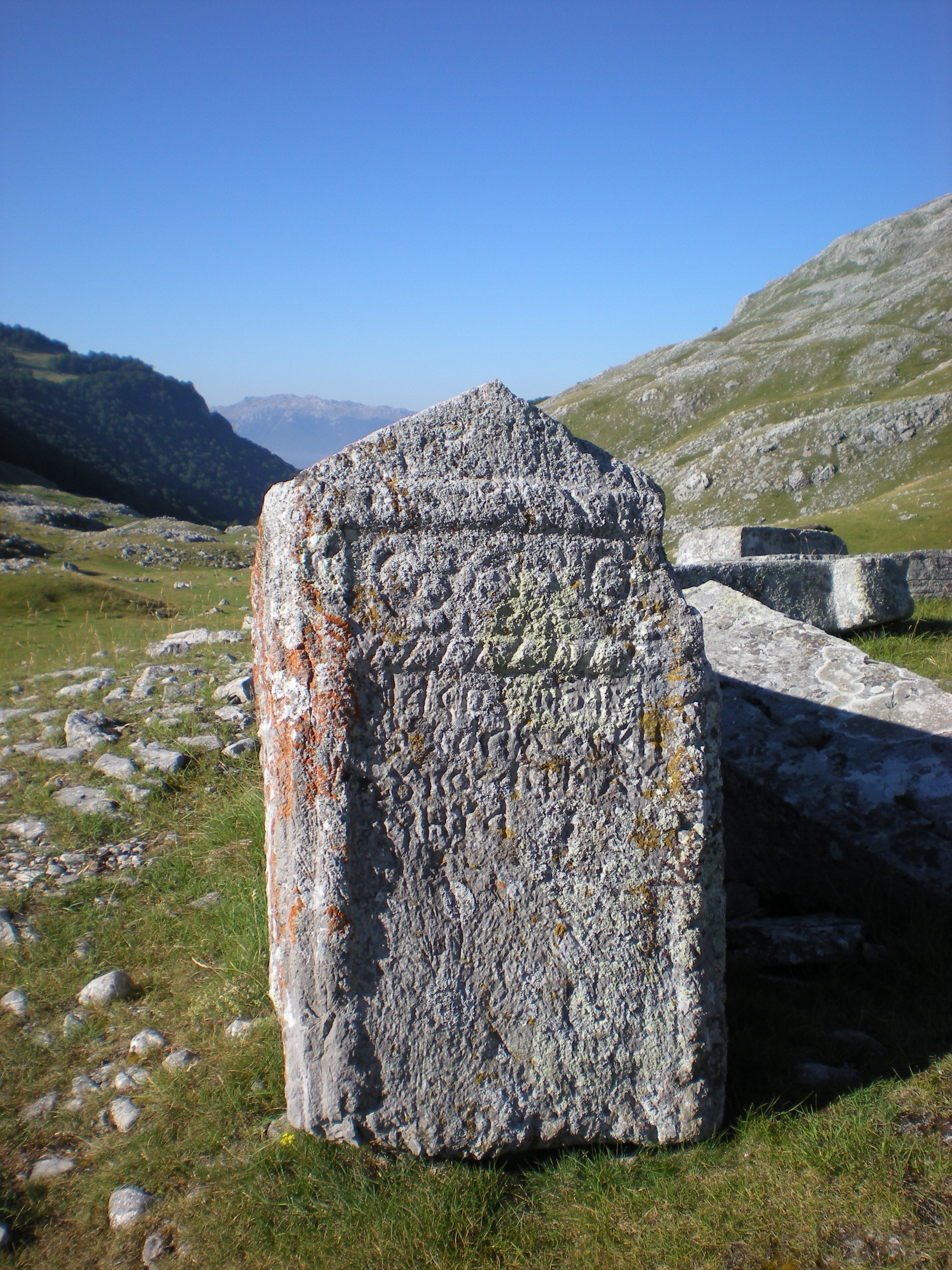

Highest point
- Elevation: 1,974 m (6,476 ft)
- Coordinates: 43°34.797′N 18°11.391′E

Geography
- Location within Bosnia and Herzegovina
- Location: Bosnia and Herzegovina
- Parent range: Dinaric Alps

Visočica (Serbian Cyrillic: Височица) is a mountain range in central Bosnia and Herzegovina. Geologically, Visočica is part of the Dinaric Alps and formed largely of secondary and tertiary sedimentary rock, mostly limestone and dolomite. Due to subterranean non-porous geological layers, the typical karst characteristics of the nearby Herzegovina mountains are relatively absent in Visočica, resulting in enough water sources, even at heights around 1500–1700 m. Springtime lakes, though, tend to dry out soon towards the summer. Some smaller streams source from these mountains as tributaries to its bordering rivers: the Ljuta in the east, the Rakitnica on its northern and western slopes and the Neretva towards the south. Notable peaks are Džamija (1974 m.), Vito (1960 m.), Veliko Ljeljen (1963 m.), Crveni Kuk (1733 m.) and Veliko Toholj (1837 m.).

== Skiing and hiking ==
The Visočica mountains were on the edges affected by the heavy combat that was going on around the Treskavica and Neretva frontlines during the 1992-1995 conflict. The central main ridges remained largely spared from warfare and the mine risk is therefore minimal within the area west of the Crveni Kuk summit and north east of a line that can be drawn between the villages of Luka and Grušća. Therefore, Visočica, is an attractive destination for hikers and tour skiers. The Visočica range consists basically of two main parallel ridges. The Toholj north east ridge -despite its wild formations- is rarely visited by hikers with the exception of Crveni Kuk, an ideal summit for ski touring on a day trip from Sarajevo. Most hikers focus on the Ljeljen (south west) ridge that culminates in the highest point: Džamija. The thick shrubs of Pinus Mugo that are typical for Bjelašnica or Lelija are almost completely absent on the Visočica ridges, possibly because of a long history of sheep herding on these water-rich mountains. Mixed forest -mostly beech- grows up to 1400 m. A rough unpaved mountain road passes through the Visočica range from Sinanovici in the east to Luka in the west. A well-furnished mountain hut is located just above Sinanovici (P.D.Vrela-Tušila) and marked itineraries to the main peaks have been re-established.

== Gallery ==
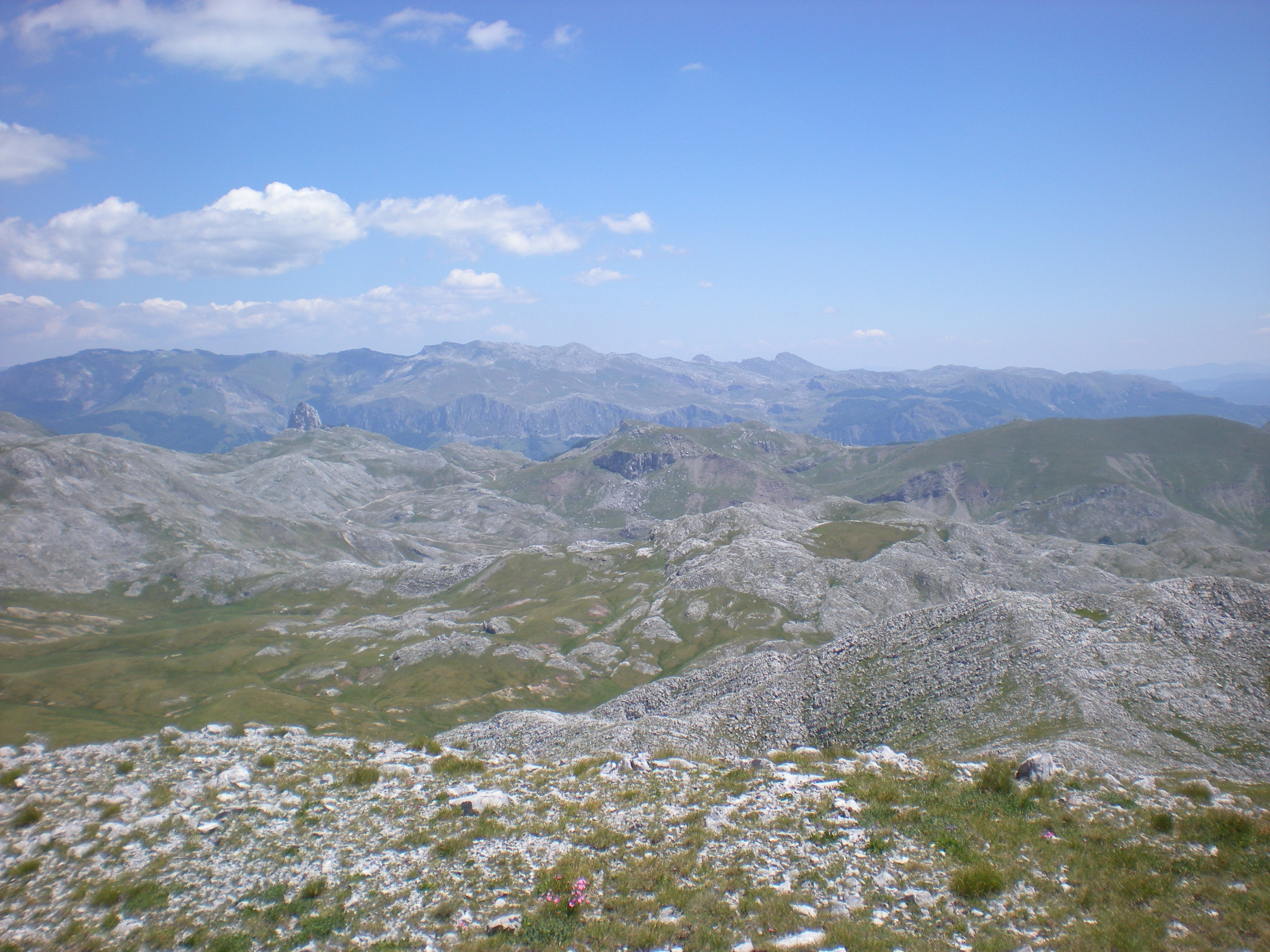
View from Dzamija summit

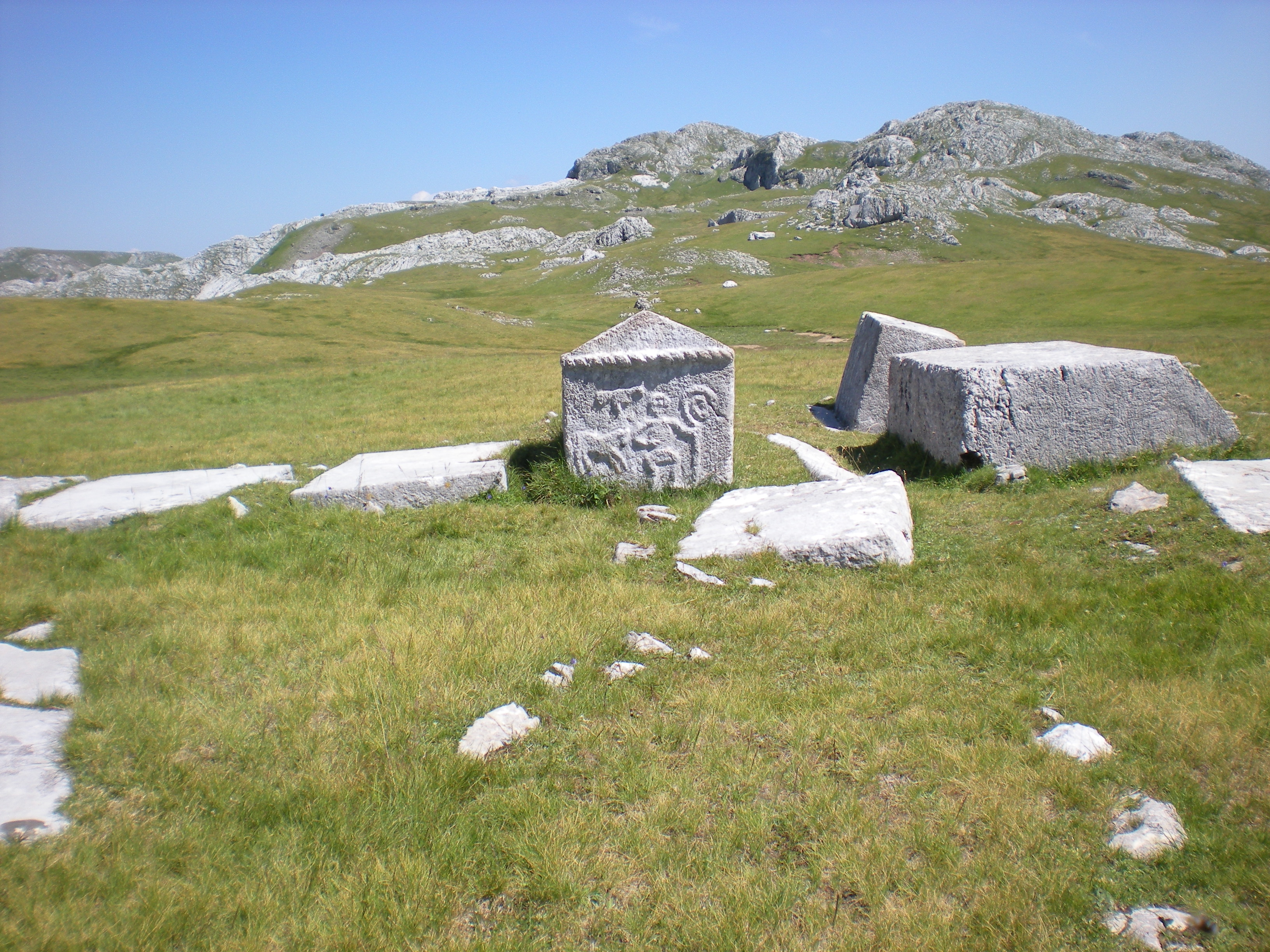
Stećci at Jezera necropolis

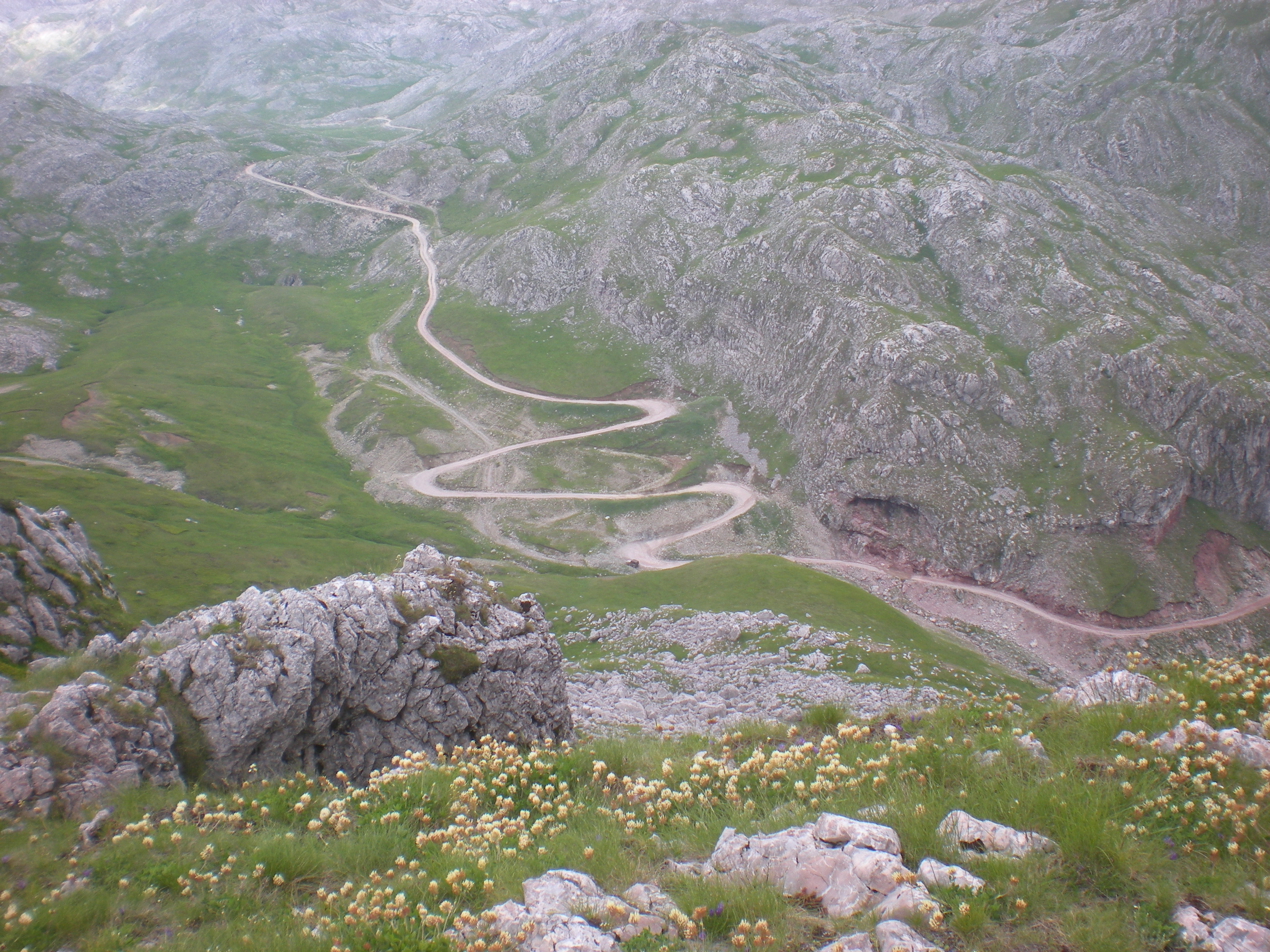
View from Crveni Kuk (1733 m)

== Stećci ==
On several sites within Visočica stećci are found. These medieval tombstones are typical for Bosnia-Herzegovina and were erected in the 14th and 15th centuries. Visočica has two so-called necropoli that are of particular interest because they are located at high altitude amidst these mountains where no trace of contemporary or historical habitation can be found. The necropolis at a site called Poljice, at the side of the mountain road at 1500 m., features two stećci that bear the rare medieval Bosnian Cyrillic inscriptions. Even further up from this site, at 1700 m. in a high deserted valley called Jezera, there is another sizable necropolis that features several ornamented stećci, one stećak showing a most striking image of -most probably- the Good Shepherd and another showing the Bosnian Lily. One passes this impressive site while hiking along the marked trail towards the summit of Džamija.
