= Fish species of the Neretva basin =

Fish fauna of the Neretva river basin

The fish fauna of the Neretva river basin in the western Balkans is representative of the Dinaric karst region and characterized by several endemic and endangered species.

Overall the Dinaric karst water systems support 25% of the total of 546 fish species in Europe. The river Neretva and its tributaries represent the main drainage system in the east Adriatic watershed and the foremost ichthyofaunal habitat of the region. The Adriatic basin has 88 species of fish, of which 44 are Mediterranean endemic species, and 41 are Adriatic endemic species. More than half of the Adriatic river basin species of fish inhabit the Neretva, the Ombla, the Trebišnjica, the Morača Rivers and their tributaries, and more than 30 are indigenous.

The degree of endemism in the karst ecoregion is greater than 10% of the total number of fish species. Numerous species live in very narrow and limited areas and are vulnerable, so they are included on the Red List of endangered fish of the IUCN. According to Smith & Darwall (2006) the Neretva River, together with four other areas in the Mediterranean, has the largest number of threatened freshwater fish species.

== Habitat ==
The Neretva river with its many tributaries, lakes and marshes provides rich freshwater habitat for its native, as well as for introduced non-native fish species. There are deep canyon as well as wide valley sections with both fast flowing rapids with side-pools, and narrow sections with deep, still waters running slowly. The flowing water can be any combination of fast or slow, deep or shallow, open or protected by canyons, rocks, tree roots and undercut banks, and shaded by vegetation on the bank or exposed to full sunlight. This variation ensures that a relatively large number of fish species are able to find suitable habitat for themselves. Upper reaches of the Neretva basin (Upper Neretva), river with its tributaries runs undisturbed through remote and rugged limestone terrain with deep canyons and steep slopes gorges reaching from 600 to 1200 m in depth. River in these parts is extremely cold, clear and potable, consisting waters of "Class I" ("Class A") purity, with temperature often as low as 7–8 degrees Celsius in the summer months, evidence of almost certainly the coldest river water in the world. In the middle section of the watershed remoteness and ruggedness of the terrain gets even more extreme, especially around small river tributaries, mountain creeks and lakes, however the Neretva river itself is completely flooded throughout entire midsection with four large artificial lakes, and intersected with four large dams. More downstream in the lower reaches (Lower Neretva), the Neretva basin and the river itself comprise remarkable landscape, in which valley from the confluence of its main tributaries of the section, the Buna, the Trebižat and Bregava rivers, then spreads into an alluvial fan, covering more than 20,000 hectares, with specious flat plains or poljes, where water-flow is slow but abundant, with many branches often widened into natural lakes and marshes, and constantly replenished with much fresh water from numerous large karstic well-springs. Finally at the Neretva Delta, the river reaches the Adriatic Sea.

== Autochthonous fishes ==
Autochthonous or native species of the Neretva basin fish are often endemic to the region. They are also often threatened or even critically endangered.

=== Salmonids ===
Salmonid fish from the Neretva basin show considerable variation in morphology, ecology and behaviour. The Neretva also has many other endemic and fragile life forms that are near extinction.

Among most endangered are three endemic species or varieties of the Neretva trout: Neretvan softmouth trout (Salmo obtusirostris oxyrhinchus, Bosnian: Neretvanska mekousna pastrmka), toothtrout (Salmo dentex, Bosnian: Zubatak, and marble trout (Salmo marmoratus, Bosnian: Glavatica. Genetic analyses of the trouts find little if any distinction between "Salmo dentex" and Salmo marmoratus of the Neretva basin, however.

Local common name	English common name	Scientific name	Status	Conservation status (IUCN)	Image	Notes
Mekousna	Softmouth also Adriatic trout	Salmo obtusirostris oxyrhyncus	Native & endemic	Endangered		*notes
Glavatica	Marble trout	Salmo marmoratus	Native & endemic	*Vulnerable		* IUCN evaluated only the Soča and the Po basins population so far as Least concerned
Zubatak	Dentex trout	Salmo dentex	Native & endemic	*Critically endangered		* No evaluation by IUCN due to data deficiency
Potočara	Brown trout	Salmo trutta fario (Adriatic lineage)	Native	Threatened	Example	*notes

All three endemic trout species of the Neretva are endangered mostly due to the habitat destruction or construction of large and major dams (large is higher than 15–20 m; major is over 150–250 m) in particular and hybridization or genetic pollution with introduced, non-native trout, also from illegal fishing as well as poor management of water and fisheries especially in form of introduction of invasive allochthonous species (dams, overfishing, mismanagement, genetic pollution, invasive species).

=== Cyprinids ===
As with the Neretva salmonids, the most endangered of cyprinids (family Cyprinidae) are endemic species. Especially interesting are four or five Phoxinellus (or Delminichthys and Telestes) (sub)species that inhabit isolated karstic plains (poljes) of eastern as well as western Herzegovina in Bosnia and Herzegovina, which eventually drain their waters to the Neretva watershed and/or coastal drainages of south-eastern Dalmatia in Croatia.

- Adriatic minnow (Phoxinellus alepidotus, Bosnian: Uklja, Croatian: Pijurica), endemic to Bosnia and Herzegovina and Croatia, occurs in lowland water bodies, with little current. It is threatened due to pollution and habitat destruction. It is considered endangered.
- South Dalmatian minnow (Phoxinellus pstrossii, Bosnian: Trebinjska gaovica), which has recently been taxonomically fused with the Dalmatian minnow (see below).
- Dalmatian minnow (Delminichthys ghetaldii or Phoxinellus ghetaldii, Bosnian: Popovska gaovica) is considered vulnerable.
- Spotted minnow (Delminichthys adspersus or Phoxinellus adspersus, Bosnian: Gaovica) is endemic to Bosnia and Herzegovina and Croatia. This species is present in the Tihaljina River, which is fed by underground waters from Imotsko polje and is connected to the Trebižat River via the Mlada River, and also occurs in Mostarsko Blato wetlands. Fish were found in the source of the Norin River, a right-hand tributary of the lower Neretva at Metković, in Croatia, at Kuti Lake, a left-hand tributary of the lower Neretva, at Imotsko polje in Red Lake and the Vrljika River drainage and near Vrgorac in the Matica River system. It is considered vulnerable.
- Karst minnow (Telestes metohiensis or Phoxinellus metohiensis, Bosnian: Gatačka gaovica) is considered Vulnerable (VU).
- Turskyi dace (Telestes turskyi, Bosnian: Turski klijen) inhabits karstic waters, Lake Buško Blato in Bosnia and Herzegovina and the Krka and Čikola Rivers in Croatia. It occurs in water courses on the low plains, with little current and in lakes. It feeds on invertebrates. It is threatened due to water abstraction and pollution. It is considered Critically Endangered (CR).
- Minnow-nase (Chondrostoma phoxinus, Bosnian: Podbila) is considered Critically Endangered (CR).
- Neretvan nase, also Dalmatian nase and Dalmatian soiffe (Chondrostoma knerii, Bosnian: Neretvanska podustva) is endemic to the Neretva River basin. It is mainly distributed in the lower parts and delta of the Neretva River shared between Croatia and Bosnia and Herzegovina, the river's left tributary Krupa River, Nature Park Hutovo Blato wetlands, and Neretva Delta wetlands. It occurs in water bodies with little current. It is threatened by habitat destruction and pollution. It is considered Vulnerable (VU).
- Adriatic dace or Balkan dace (Squalius svallize, Bosnian: Strugač; Croatian: Sval) is endemic to Bosnia and Herzegovina and Croatia, also to Montenegro and Albania. Adults inhabit water bodies on the low plains, with little current and in lakes. They feed on invertebrates. It is threatened due to pollution, habitat destruction and due to introduction of other species. It is considered vulnerable.
- Illyrian dace (Squalius illyricus, Bosnian: Ilirski klijen) inhabits karstic waters of Bosnia and Herzegovina, Croatia and Albania. It occurs in water courses on low plains, with little current. It feeds on invertebrates. It is threatened due to habitat destruction, pollution and the introduction of other species. It is considered Near Threatened (NT).
- Dalmatian barbelgudgeon (Aulopyge hugelii, Bosnian: Oštrulja) inhabits karstic streams of Glamocko polje, Livanjsko polje and Duvanjsko polje, lakes Buško Blato, Blidinje in Bosnia and Herzegovina and Cetina, Krka and Zrmanja river drainages in Croatia. It occurs in lentic waters, and feeds on plants. The fish is threatened by water pollution and habitat destruction. It is migratory in Livanjsko polje. It is considered endangered.

=== Cobitidae ===
Neretvan spined loach (Cobitis narentana Bosnian: Neretvanski vijun) is an Adriatic watershed endemic fish that inhabits a narrow area of the Neretva watershed in Croatia and Bosnia and Herzegovina. In Bosnia and Herzegovina it inhabits only the downstream of the Neretva River and its smaller tributaries like the Matica River. In Croatia it is a strictly protected species and inhabits only the Neretva delta and its smaller tributaries, the (Norin) and lake systems of the Neretva delta (Baćina lakes, Kuti, Desne, Modro oko. It is considered Vulnerable (VU).

=== Neretva delta endemics ===
The ichthyofauna of the Neretva delta is rich in endemic species, and there are more than 20 endemic species, of which 18 species are endemic species of the Adriatic watershed, and three endemic species in Croatia. Nearly half (45%) of the total number of species that inhabit this area are included in one of the categories of threat, and are mainly endemic species.

== Allochthonous fishes ==
=== Pike-perch ===
The allochthonous pike-perch (Sander lucioperca, Bosnian: Smuđ) was observed in 1990 for the first time in the Rama River, a right tributary of the Neretva, and its Rama Lake. The population has been growing since then. This accords with the prediction by Škrijelj (1991, 1995) that pike-perch could spread from the Ramsko Lake to the Rama River and then further downstream. In 1990 the pike-perch population made up 1.95% of the fish population in Rama Lake. Within a decade this rose to 25.42% in the nearby Jablaničko Lake.

The fast pace of the pike-perch population growth and displacements in the Neretva River basin is expected to match the environmental conditions from the mid-ecological valence of this fish. In this sense, it is the established continuous and accelerated growth of the population dynamics of pike-perch in Jablaničko Lake, a relatively good representation in artificial Salakovačko Lake and the beginning of growth of population in the Grabovičko Lake. Parallel with the increase of population of pike-perch in the Neretva lakes is the obvious decrease in the quantity of indigenous species like the European chub (Squalius cephalus), and the disappearance of rare and endemic species like Adriatic dace (Squalius svallize), Neretvan softmouth trout (Salmothymus obtusirostris oxyrhinchus) and marble trout (Salmo marmoratus). If the migration and spreading continues other endangered and endemic species of the Neretva basin will be even more endangered.

The populations of the allochthonous pike-perch have visible negative effects on the autochthonous ichthyofauna in Jablaničko Lake; in the artificial Salakovačko Lake these effects are in progress and less visible. The effects of perch population in Grabovičko Lake are not yet clearly visible. Yet the perch population in the Neretva river "lakes" seems to be growing with a tendency of spreading across the Neretva river basin of the Adriatic Sea in Bosnia and Herzegovina.

On the basis of all relevant indicators it is necessarily to take urgent measures, continuous and organized action, to dramatically reduce the quantity (if is not possible to exterminate) of this allochthonous type of fish, as well as to attempt to revitalize autochthonal fish populations, with fish stocking of local, especially salmonids species, all in order to prevent the same fatal experience with the water ecosystem in the UK, and prevent, if possible, this type of allochthonous species colonization of the Neretva River basins with irreversible effects.

=== Invasive salmonids ===
Like in many rivers around Europe, there are some introduced salmonid fish species in the Neretva. Of these only grayling (Thymallus thymallus) established stable population so far, while the more harmful rainbow trout (Oncorhynchus mykiss) had lower survival rate and accordingly low population growth and small size. Brook trout (Salvelinus fontinalis) and lake trout (Salvelinus namaycush) have also recently been introduced to almost all of the Neretva basin reservoirs, but had only moderate to low success in establishing stable populations. At least for now populations of these invasive salmonids are rather weak. The largest threat, though, represent species much closers to indigenous Neretva's salmonids. It's a two variation of stocked Brown trout, Danube and Atlantic sub-species, that threatens survival of the Neretva Softmouth to certain extent but more significantly indigenous Neretva's Brown trout of Adriatic strain through cross-breading.
