= Salakovac Hydroelectric Power Station =

Salakovac Hydro Power Plant
- Location within Bosnia and Herzegovina
- Interactive map of Salakovac Hydro Power Plant
- Country: Bosnia and Herzegovina
- Location: Salakovac
- Coordinates: 43.448077°N 17.836073°E
- Purpose: Electricity generation
- Status: Operational
- Opening date: 1981
- Owner: Government of the FBiH

Dam and spillways
- Type of dam: Gravity dam

Reservoir
- Creates: Salakovac Lake

Power Station
- Operator: JP "Elektroprivreda BiH"
- Commission date: 1979
- Type: run-of-the-river
- Turbines: Francis
- Installed capacity: 210 MW
- Annual generation: 410 GWh

The Salakovac Hydro Power Plant is one of Bosnia and Herzegovina's largest hydro power plants having an installed three electric generators capacity of 210 MW. It was commissioned 1979, and built on the Neretva River.

== See also ==
- List of power stations in Bosnia-Herzegovina
