= Prenj =

Mountain in Bosnia and Herzegovina

- Prenj's summit: Zelena Glava in the middle, with Otiš to the left and Little Otiš to the right

Highest point
- Elevation: 2,103 m (6,900 ft)
- Prominence: 1,117 m (3,665 ft)
- Listing: Ribu
- Coordinates: 43°32′05″N 17°54′15″E

Geography
- Location within Bosnia and Herzegovina
- Location: Bosnia and Herzegovina
- Parent range: Dinaric Alps

Prenj (Serbian Cyrillic: Прењ) is a mountain range in the Dinaric Alps of southern Bosnia and Herzegovina, located in eastern Herzegovina near Mostar, Jablanica and Konjic. The highest peak is Zelena glava at 2,103 m (6,900 ft). Prenj massif has at least 11 peaks over 2000 m.

== Geography ==
The name Prenj is derived from Perun, supreme deity of Slavic mythology. Geologically, the Prenj range is part of the Dinaric Alps and formed largely of Mesozoic and Cenozoic sedimentary rock, mostly limestone and dolomite with notable characteristics of a karst landform. Due to subterranean drainage, Prenj is relatively dry with few water sources, just a few tiny and one large lake and some small streams that get waters from these mountains, such as Konjička Bijela, Baščica, Glogošnica, Mostarska Bijela, all tributaries of the Neretva. Beneath the plateau Borci on the northeaster slopes and Crna Gora mountain on the east, at the end of the deep ravine of Boračka draga a large glacial lake, Boračko Lake, formed during the expansive process of glacial erosion. The lake is exorheic and belongs to Prenj's watershed, as it is refilled with a stream originating on the mountain and flowing through Boračka draga into the lake's southwestern shore. Šištica river is the lake's outflow.

Notable peaks are Zelena Glava (2115 m), Lupoglav (2102 m), Otiš (2097 m), Herač (2046 m), Osobac (2030 m) and Velika Kapa (2007 m).

== History ==
When the German and Italian Zones of Influence were revised on 24 June 1942, Prenj formed the boundary between the German Zone III, administered civilly by Croatia and militarily by Croatia and Germany, and the Italian Zone II, administered civilly by Croatia but militarily by Italy.

The Prenj mountains were part of the front line during the 1992–95 war in Bosnia and heavy combat took place in the mountains surrounding the eastern Bijela valley and the slopes above Konjic. Nowadays, Prenj falls almost entirely within the territory of the Federation of Bosnia and Herzegovina. Contamination with land mines and unexploded ordnance is a serious threat, especially east of a line that can be drawn from Čelebići to the summit of Zelena Glava and then to the village of Ravni. Former combat positions can be found as high up as the shoulders of Otiš at around 2000 meters. Nevertheless, Prenj is a very attractive destination for climbers and hikers. The peaks bear typical dolomitic features with vertical rock faces, soaring over green alpine valleys and dense mixed forests. Some mountain huts have re-opened (Bijele Vode, Hrasnica) and marked itineraries to the main peaks have been re-established.

One of the peaks of Prenj, Windy Peak, was climbed for the first time in October 2003. It was probably one of Europe's last virgin 2000m peaks.

== See also ==
- Perun

== Bibliography ==
- Trgo, Fabijan, ed. (1964). Zbornik dokumenata i podataka o Narodno-oslobodilačkom ratu Jugoslovenskih naroda. Vol. V, 32.
- Poljak, Željko (February 1959). "Prenj". Kazalo za "Hrvatski planinar" i "Naše planine" 1898—1958 (PDF). Naše planine (in Croatian). Vol. XI. p. 22. ISSN 0354-0650.
- Guber, Mihovil (1943). "Pustošenje planinarskih objekata u južnoj Hrvatskoj" [The Desolation of Mountain Objects in Southern Croatia] (PDF). Hrvatski planinar (in Croatian). Vol. 39, no. 6–7. pp. 85–93. ISSN 0354-0650.
