= Grabovica Hydroelectric Power Station =

Grabovica Hydro Power Plant
- Location within Bosnia and Herzegovina
- Interactive map of Grabovica Hydro Power Plant
- Country: Bosnia and Herzegovina
- Location: Herzegovina-Neretva
- Coordinates: 43.587°N 17.719°E
- Purpose: Electricity generation
- Status: Operational
- Opening date: 1982
- Owner: Government of the Federation of Bosnia and Herzegovina

Dam and spillways
- Type of dam: Gravity dam

Reservoir
- Creates: Grabovica Lake

Power Station
- Operator: JP "Elektroprivreda BiH"
- Commission date: 1979
- Type: run-of-the-river
- Installed capacity: 114 MW
- Annual generation: 334 GWh

The Grabovica Hydro Power Plant is one of Bosnia and Herzegovina's largest hydro power plant having an installed two electric generator capacity of 114 MW. It was commissioned 1979, and built on the Neretva River. It was opened in 1982. Facility is owned by Government of the Federation of Bosnia and Herzegovina and operated by JP Elektroprivreda BiH.

== See also ==
- List of power stations in Bosnia-Herzegovina
