= Mostarska Bijela =

Mostarska Bijela Bijela
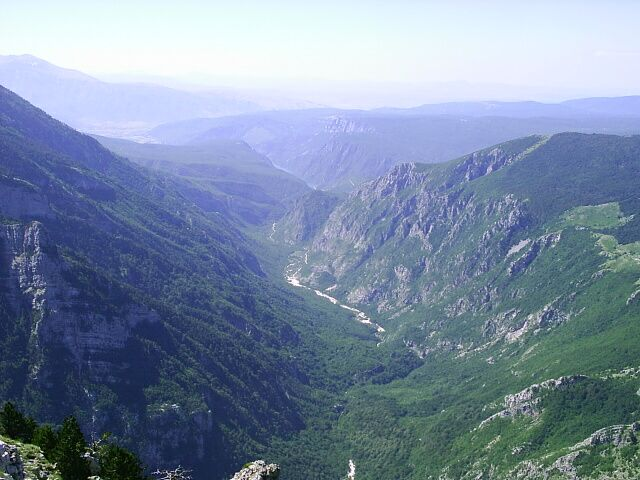
- Dolina Bijele

- Location within Bosnia and Herzegovina

Location
- Country: Bosnia and Herzegovina
- Municipality: Mostar

Physical characteristics
- Source
  - location: Prenj
  - coordinates: 43.5660886°N 17.8055334°E
- Mouth: Salakovačko Lake (the Neretva)
  - location: Bijela (Mostar)
  - coordinates: 43.4827°N 17.8104°E

Basin features
- Progression: Neretva→ Adriatic Sea
- Tributaries
  - left: Crveni Potok (Red Creek), Bućevac, Drenovac
- Waterbodies: Salakovačko Lake
- Waterfalls: series of unnamed underground falls within cavernous stretch of the course

Mostarska Bijela or simply Bijela is a mountain creek and gorge in Bosnia and Herzegovina. Despite its low discharge and relatively short flow, this river takes a significant place in Bosnia and Herzegovina's Dinaric karst's geology and hydrology.

== Geography ==
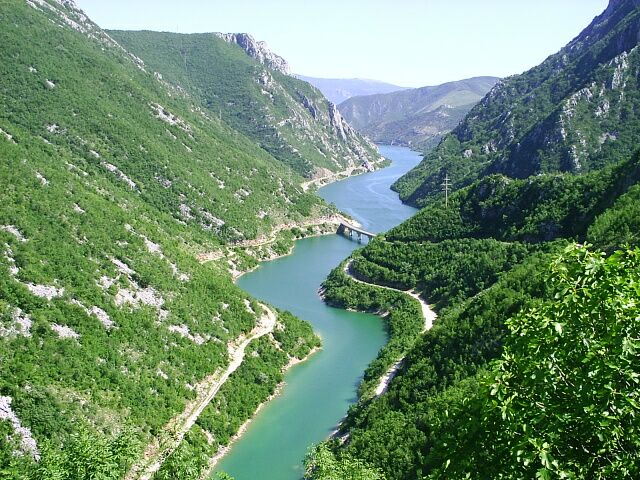
The Bijela confluence with the Neretva - Salakovac artificial rezervoir covers the mouth and cca. 1 kilometers of the river.

The Mostarska Bijela is a left tributary of the Neretva river. It begins at the south-western slopes of Prenj mountain, where it is called Gornja Bijela ("Gornja" in English: "Upper"), and flows in direction of north to south-southwest and into the Neretva at Bijela village in the region of Drežnica Donja and Salakovac.

== Rare geology ==
The Mostarska Bijela river shapes a karstic geological feature, which resembles an underground river with canyon-like semi-underground flow. The cave roof of its underground section is open to the surface in the form of a very narrow gap in many places, allowing a small amount of light to enter the cavernous river course. Although the underground course is difficult to traverse, it is attractive for tourists, mountaineers, and practitioners of canyoning and speleology.

== Highway A1 Corridor Vc environmental controversy ==
According to the first variant of the proposed route of a new highway through Prenj, valleys of the Konjička Bijela and the Mostarska Bijela should be heavily affected, where not much of its natural environment would remained. Beautiful karst phenomenons of deep canyons, underground waterfalls and caves in Mostarska Bijela valley will be destroyed, or at least covered by the asphalt, concrete or stone fill from the tunnels.

Route of A1 C5 highway through Bosnia

== See also ==
- Media related to Mostarska Bijela at Wikimedia Commons
- List of rivers in Bosnia and Herzegovina
