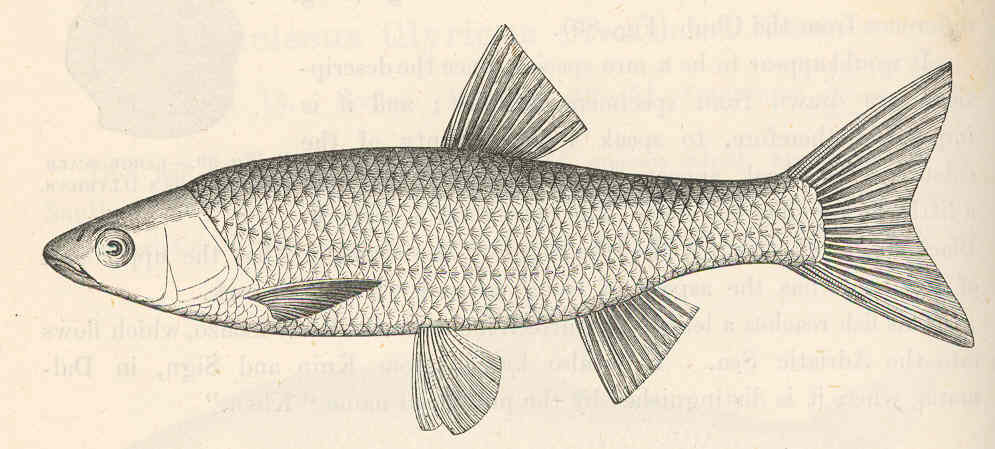

Conservation status
- Near Threatened (IUCN 3.1)

Scientific classification
- Kingdom: Animalia
- Phylum: Chordata
- Class: Actinopterygii
- Division: Teleostei
- Order: Cypriniformes
- Family: Leuciscidae
- Subfamily: Leuciscinae
- Genus: Squalius
- Species: S. svallize

Binomial name
- Squalius svallize Heckel & Kner, 1858

Synonyms
- Leuciscus svallize (Heckel & Kner, 1858)

= Squalius svallize =

Species of fish

Squalius svallize, the Neretva chub, known locally by its common name strugać and/or sval, is a species of freshwater ray-finned fish belonging to the family Leuciscidae, which includes the daces, Eurasian minnows and related fishes. Its natural habitats are rivers and inland karst's bodies of water. It is threatened by habitat loss. Its main habitat is the Neretva river and its tributaries in Bosnia and Herzegovina and Croatia.
