= Delminichthys ghetaldii =

Conservation status
- Vulnerable (IUCN 3.1)

Scientific classification
- Kingdom: Animalia
- Phylum: Chordata
- Class: Actinopterygii
- Order: Cypriniformes
- Family: Leuciscidae
- Subfamily: Leuciscinae
- Genus: Delminichthys
- Species: D. ghetaldii

Binomial name
- Delminichthys ghetaldii (Steindachner, 1882)

Synonyms
- Paraphoxinus ghetaldi Steindachner, 1882; Phoxinellus ghetaldii (Steindachner, 1882); Paraphoxinus pstrossi Steindachner, 1882; Phoxinellus pstrossii (Steindachner, 1882)

Species of fish

Delminichthys ghetaldii, the South Dalmatian minnow, is a species of freshwater ray-finned fish belonging to the family Leuciscidae. This species is found in southeastern Europe.

It is found in Bosnia and Herzegovina, with its natural habitats being rivers, freshwater springs, and inland karsts. It is threatened by habitat loss. The name is in honor of Ragusan Mayor and horticulturalist Francesco Ghetaldi-Gondola (1833-1899), who apparently facilitated the collection of type from a cave in Herzegovina in 1882.

== Sources ==
- Froese, Rainer; Pauly, Daniel (eds.). "Delminichthys ghetaldii". FishBase. August 2011 version.
