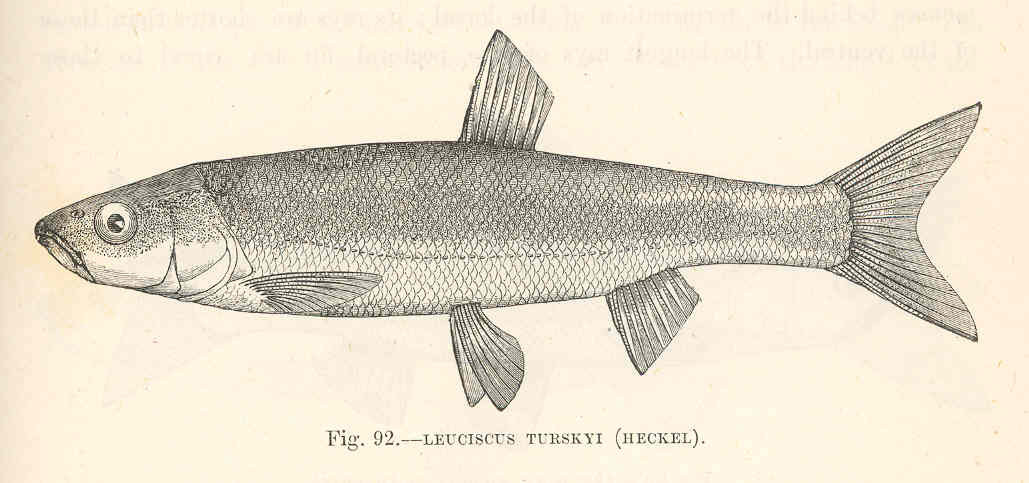

Conservation status
- Endangered (IUCN 3.1)

Scientific classification
- Kingdom: Animalia
- Phylum: Chordata
- Class: Actinopterygii
- Order: Cypriniformes
- Family: Leuciscidae
- Subfamily: Leuciscinae
- Genus: Telestes
- Species: T. turskyi

Binomial name
- Telestes turskyi (Heckel, 1843)

Synonyms
- Squalius turskyi Heckel, 1843; Leuciscus turskyi (Heckel, 1843)

= Telestes turskyi =

Species of fish

Telestes turskyi, Tursky's dace, is a species of ray-finned fish belonging to the family Leuciscidae, which includes the daces, Eurasian minnows and related species. This species is endemic to Buško Lake in Bosnia and Herzegovina and the Čikola, a tributary of the Krka River, in Croatia. This species was thought to be extinct, but was rediscovered in May 2002 by J. Freyhof and N. Bogutskaya. Its habitat continues to decline due to water extraction and drought.

== See also ==
- Lazarus taxon
