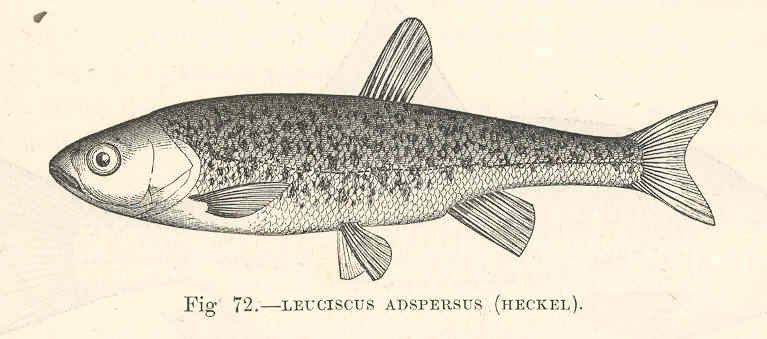

Conservation status
- Endangered (IUCN 3.1)

Scientific classification
- Kingdom: Animalia
- Phylum: Chordata
- Class: Actinopterygii
- Order: Cypriniformes
- Family: Leuciscidae
- Subfamily: Leuciscinae
- Genus: Delminichthys
- Species: D. adspersus

Binomial name
- Delminichthys adspersus (Heckel, 1843)

Synonyms
- Leucos adspersus Heckel, 1843; Paraphoxinus adspersus (Heckel 1843); Phoxinellus adspersus (Heckel 1843)

= Delminichthys adspersus =

Species of fish

Delminichthys adspersus, the spotted minnow,) is a species of freshwater ray-finned fish belonging to the family Leuciscidae.

It is found in Bosnia and Herzegovina and Croatia. Its natural habitats are rivers, intermittent rivers, freshwater lakes, and inland karsts.

It is threatened by habitat loss.
