= Telestes metohiensis =

Conservation status
- Endangered (IUCN 3.1)

Scientific classification
- Kingdom: Animalia
- Phylum: Chordata
- Class: Actinopterygii
- Order: Cypriniformes
- Family: Leuciscidae
- Subfamily: Leuciscinae
- Genus: Telestes
- Species: T. metohiensis

Binomial name
- Telestes metohiensis (Steindachner, 1901)

Synonyms
- Paraphoxinus metohiensis Steindachner, 1901; Phoxinellus metohiensis (Steindachner, 1901)

Species of fish

Telestes metohiensis, the striped dace, is a species of freshwater ray-finned fish belonging to the family Leuciscidae, which includes the daces, Eurasian minnows and related species. It is found in Bosnia and Herzegovina and Croatia. Its natural habitats are freshwater springs and inland karsts. It is threatened by habitat loss.
