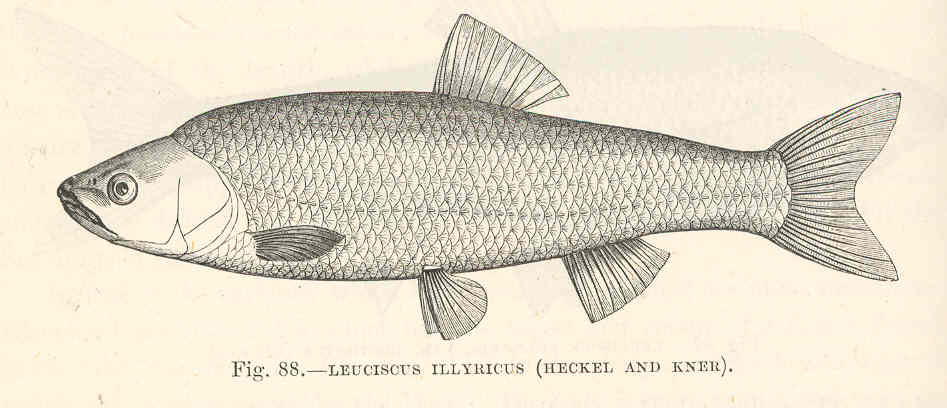

Conservation status
- Near Threatened (IUCN 3.1)

Scientific classification
- Kingdom: Animalia
- Phylum: Chordata
- Class: Actinopterygii
- Order: Cypriniformes
- Family: Leuciscidae
- Subfamily: Leuciscinae
- Genus: Squalius
- Species: S. illyricus

Binomial name
- Squalius illyricus Heckel & Kner, 1858

Synonyms
- Leuciscus illyricus (Heckel & Kner, 1858)

= Squalius illyricus =

Species of fish

Squalius illyricus, the Illyrian chub, is a species of freshwater ray-finned fish belonging to the family Leuciscidae, the daces, Eurasian minnows and related fishes. It inhabits karstic waters of Bosnia and Herzegovina, Croatia and Albania. Its natural habitats are rivers and water storage areas. It is threatened by habitat loss.

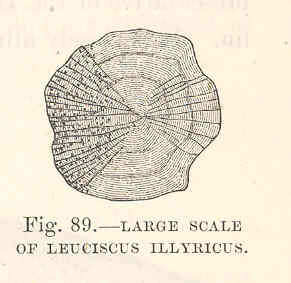
Scale of Squalius illyricus
