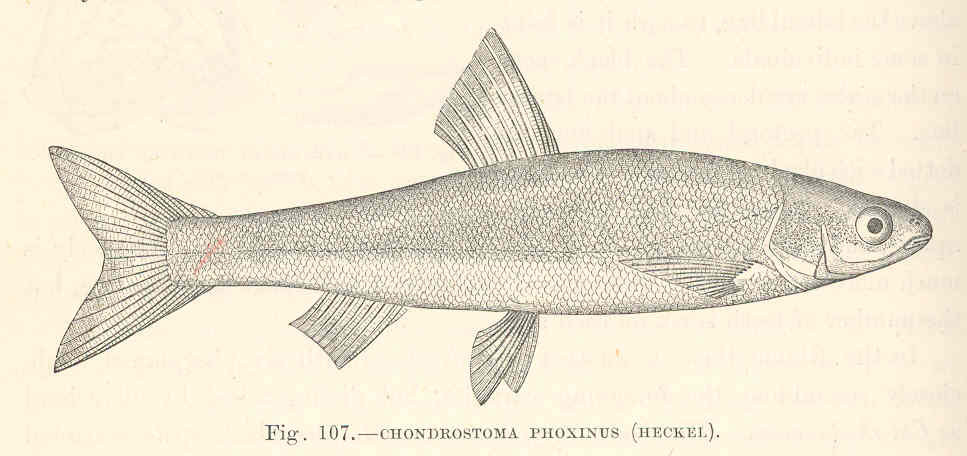

Conservation status
- Endangered (IUCN 3.1)

Scientific classification
- Kingdom: Animalia
- Phylum: Chordata
- Class: Actinopterygii
- Order: Cypriniformes
- Family: Leuciscidae
- Subfamily: Leuciscinae
- Genus: Chondrostoma
- Species: C. phoxinus

Binomial name
- Chondrostoma phoxinus Heckel, 1843

= Minnow-nase =

Species of fish

The minnow-nase, (Chondrostoma phoxinus) is a species of freshwater ray-finned fish in the family Leuciscidae. It is found in Bosnia and Herzegovina and Croatia. Its natural habitats are rivers, intermittent rivers, and inland karsts. It is threatened by habitat loss and considered Endangered.
