= Grabovica Lake =

- Grabovičko Lake
- Location within Bosnia and Herzegovina
- Interactive map of Grabovica Lake
- Location: Bosnia and Herzegovina
- Coordinates: 43°37′22″N 17°45′43″E
- Type: reservoir
- Part of: Neretva
- River sources: Neretva, Glogošnica, Komadinovo Vrelo

Grabovica Lake or Grabovičko Lake is an artificial lake (reservoir) on the Neretva in Bosnia and Herzegovina. On the Neretva course it is situated just above Salakovačko Lake, located in the municipality of Jablanica.

== See also ==
- List of lakes in Bosnia and Herzegovina
