= Glogošnica =

- Village
- Location within Bosnia and Herzegovina
- Country: Bosnia and Herzegovina
- Entity: Federation of Bosnia and Herzegovina
- Canton: Herzegovina-Neretva
- Municipality: Jablanica

Area
  - Total: 12.66 sq mi (32.78 km^{2})

Population (2013)
  - Total: 360
  - Density: 28/sq mi (11/km^{2})
- Time zone: UTC+1 (CET)
  - Summer (DST): UTC+2 (CEST)

Glogošnica is a village in the municipality of Jablanica, Bosnia and Herzegovina.

== Demographics ==
According to the 2013 census, its population was 360.

Ethnicity in 2013
Ethnicity	Number	Percentage
Bosniaks	351	97.5%
Croats	8	2.2%
other/undeclared	1	0.3%
Total	360	100%
