= Salakovac Lake =

- Salakovačko Lake
- Location within Bosnia and Herzegovina
- Interactive map of Salakovac Lake
- Location: Bosnia and Herzegovina
- Coordinates: 43.45309167349505°N 17.830050910557304°E
- Type: reservoir
- Part of: Neretva
- River sources: Neretva, Drežanka
- Basin countries: Bosnia and Herzegovina
- Built: 1982

Salakovac Lake or Salakovačko Lake is an artificial lake (reservoir) on the Neretva in Bosnia and Herzegovina. On the Neretva course it is situated just below Grabovičko Lake located in the municipality of Jablanica.

== See also ==
- List of lakes in Bosnia and Herzegovina
