= Igman =

Mountain plateau in central Bosnia and Herzegovina

- Игман
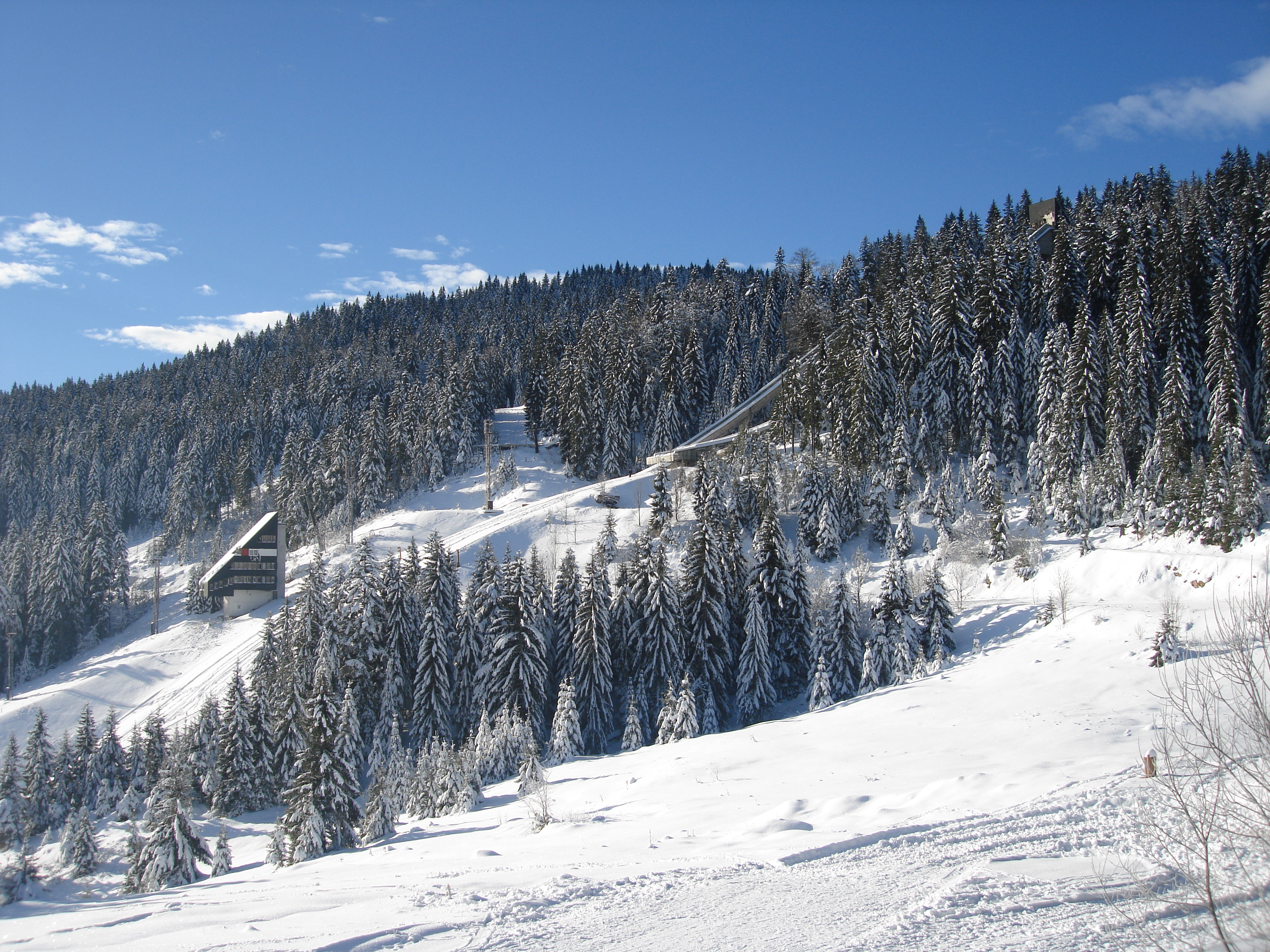
- Igman in winter

Highest point
- Elevation: 1,510 m (4,950 ft)
- Coordinates: 43.74°N 18.15°E

Geography
- Location within Bosnia and Herzegovina
- Location: Bosnia and Herzegovina
- Parent range: Dinaric Alps

Igman (Serbian Cyrillic: Игман, pronounced [îɡman]) is a mountain plateau in central Bosnia and Herzegovina. Geologically, Igman is part of the Dinaric Alps and formed largely of secondary and tertiary sedimentary rock, mostly Limestone. It is located southwest of Sarajevo, bordering the Bjelašnica range in the south and west, Hadžići and Ilidža in the north, and the river Željeznica in the east. Igman's highest point, Crni vrh, west of the Malo Polje road, at an altitude of 1,510 metres (4,954 feet), the homonym highest elevation on the east side of this road reaches an elevation of 1,502 metres (4,928 feet). Most of Igman is covered with mixed forest with local pastures (f.i.: Veliko Polje: Large Field, Malo Polje: Small Field). Igman was the location of the lowest recorded temperature in the region, −43 °C (−45 °F). Igman was the site of extensive combat during the 1992-95 Siege of Sarajevo and certain areas, in particular the surroundings of former front lines, constitute a high mine risk.

== Sports ==
During the 1984 Winter Olympics, Igman was, along with Jahorina and Bjelašnica, the location of the competition in the alpine and Nordic sports disciplines. Igman hosted primarily the Nordic disciplines; the Igman Olympic Jumps in the Malo Polje area were the site of the ski jumping events and also the ski jumping part of the Nordic combined events. Meanwhile, the Veliko Polje hosted the biathlon, cross-country skiing, and the cross-country skiing part of the Nordic combined event. In preparation of the Games a road was constructed across the Igman plateau connecting Sarajevo through Hadžići to the Malo Polje, Veliko Polje and Babin Dol venues. There were numerous structures constructed on Igman at this time, although many stand destroyed or bear the scars of the 1992-1995 conflict. One of the most eye catching structures remains the Ski Jumping platform at Malo Polje.

== Recent military history ==
=== World War II ===
Although the Igman area may probably have been the scene of military controversy in the earlier history of Bosnia and Herzegovina, the most striking events took place in the course of the 20th century. The area became of substantial military significance during the struggle between Tito's Partisans and the German occupational forces during the Second World War. A renowned episode of this struggle took place on Igman during Operation Südost Kroatien associated with what is known as the Second Enemy Offensive in January 1942. The Partisan 1st Proletarian Brigade, pursued by the German 342. Infanterie-Division, crossed Igman in what is known as the "Igman March". With temperatures reaching −32 °C (−26 °F), 172 Partisans suffered severe hypothermic injury, 6 of whom died.[12] When they approached the German–Italian demarcation line south of Sarajevo, the Partisans were able to infiltrate through the weak Italian cordon. A monument in memory of the Partisan struggle in this area is to be found on Veliko Polje.

=== Bosnian War ===
Mount Igman was usurped in the course of the Bosnian War, and suddenly became an area of major strategic importance as part of the Siege of Sarajevo. The predominantly Bosniak villages of Hrasnica and Butmir held out as an ARBiH stronghold between the VRS-held villages of Ilidža and Vojkovići, forming a corridor connecting the slopes of Mt Igman with the UN-controlled airport of Sarajevo.

After the completion of the Sarajevo Tunnel under the airport in July 1993, the small unpaved forest road passing over Mt Igman became the sole important supply road into the besieged city. The ARBiH-controlled central plateau of Igman came under increased VRS pressure when the suspicion became stronger that the area had become a major logistical artery of the besieged city. A major VRS offensive started July 1993 and on August 4, 1993 Serb forces captured part of the Igman supply road. The VRS advance was stopped under threat of NATO airstrikes.

The area was declared a Demilitarized Zone (DMZ) by the UN after the VRS retreated and UNPROFOR units were stationed on Igman and nearby Bjelašnica. The supply road into Sarajevo was agreed to be used for humanitarian goods only, but ARBiH logistical activity on the road and through the tunnel continued nevertheless. Discussion about real or alleged reluctance to withdraw ARBiH forces from the DMZ was a growing issue between UNPROFOR Commander General Rose and ARBiH Commander General Delić, with VRS Commander Mladić waiting for an opportunity to close the gap. Trucks on the Igman supply road's narrow last stretch descending the steep north-eastern slope became fully exposed to fire from VRS artillery positions in Ilidža and Vojkovici.

Meanwhile, the ARBiH units remaining on the plateau were formally restricted to R&R activities, notably resulting in the building of the Igman Džamija, a wooden mosque in the forest, still much frequented today. The Igman supply road remained the almost exclusive supply route into Sarajevo until the end of the war. It was also the only entry and exit road for the Bosnian political leadership. Bosnian president Alija Izetbegović and foreign secretary Muhamed Sacirbey traveled through this road.

Foreign negotiators tended to avoid the road as it was "often described as the most dangerous road in Europe". Forced by a Serb blockade of the Sarajevo Airport, on August 19, 1995, a US Peace Mission headed by Richard Holbrooke took this road in order to reach Sarajevo for a meeting with the Bosnian presidency. Holbrooke decided to sit with General Wesley Clark in a Humvee, while the other members of the delegation travelled in a French UNPROFOR Renault VAB Armored Personnel Carrier. At a particular exposed and narrow point -- now marked by a French memorial plaque -- the French APC went over the edge and rolled and tumbled down some 400 metres. US Diplomats Robert Frasure, Nelson Drew and Joe Kruzel as well as the French Corporal-driver perished in the incident. The battered APC is still to be seen where it ultimately came to a halt - next to a memorial site for the victims.

By mid-1995 the military situation became very tense again, and in August 1995 the VRS launched another offensive forcing UNPROFOR from the Bjelašnica ridge and advancing again towards Veliko Polje. After the second Markale shelling, on August, 30 NATO started Operation Deliberate Force, in which NATO aircraft engaged VRS Command & Control facilities and other targets. In conjunction with these attacks a Rapid Reaction Force consisting of units of the British 19th Reg. Royal Artillery, the French 2nd Legion Etranger d'Infanterie and the Dutch 1e Mortiercompagnie of the NL Marine Corps, was deployed on Igman with (RNLA) search radars and heavy artillery, engaging any actively firing VRS artillery installation around Sarajevo until 14 September 1995, when the NATO air strikes were suspended to allow the implementation of the withdrawal of VRS heavy weapons from the Sarajevo exclusion zone, effectively ending the Siege of Sarajevo. A number of memorials and war cemetery sites is found throughout the Igman plateau.

== Skiing and hiking ==
Igman is a popular destination for mountain-biking, hiking and skiing. Skiers will find -apart from 2 baby lifts- a single major skilift at Malo Polje that will bring them to 1,490 metres (4,888 feet) with a single descent piste of 1.6 kilometres (1.0 mile) red/bleu with a black split-off of 0.2 kilometres (0.1 miles). Mountain bikers will find a vast network of forest roads on Igman. The steep north-eastern slope of Igman is popular with mountain bikers, who use the former wartime supply road to climb from Hrasnica up to an altitude of 1,250 metres (4,101 feet), and then descend with some bravura via a hiking trail. This hiking trail connects the village with the main mountain hut in the area: Hrasnički Stan. Another trail leads from Hrasnica to the Memorial for the deceased American diplomats and the memorial plaque for the French military fallen on this road and ends also at Hrasnički Stan. From there other trails lead to the mountain hut at Malo Polje proceeding further east towards the Javornik mountain hut.

== Mountain huts ==
In the 1935–1936 season, the mountain hut on Kasov Dol, at 1,275 metres (4,183 ft) in elevation, saw 345 visitors. In the 1936–1937 season, it saw 443 visitors, including 3 Austrian and 2 German citizens. In the 1937–1938 season it saw 557 visitors, including 15 German and 12 Austrian citizens.

== Other ==
At the very foot of the mountain, close to Ilidža, are the sources of the river Bosna: Vrelo Bosne. This area is one of the most popular recreational areas of Sarajevo, and one its most important drinking water sources. Nearby lies one of the residential villas of Marshal Tito: Stojcevac, now fully destroyed. The area further up above Vrelo Bosne is the location of the former frontline and inaccessible because of heavy contamination with land mines and UXO. Demining activities on former frontlines have taken place and are still taking place around recreational areas and the main roads.

One of the primeval forests of Bosnia and Herzegovina, Ravna Vala is also located on mountain Igman.

== Igman Initiative ==
The Igman mountain, with its wartime legacy, has lend its name to a non-governmental/political initiative that is aimed at bringing the former belligerents in the region together. The mission of the Igman Initiative is to encourage normalization of the overall relations among the countries of the Dayton Quadrangles. The initiative was named after Mt. Igman in remembrance of the intellectual activists, who traveled from all over former Yugoslavia via the Igman Mountain Road to Sarajevo in April 1995 in solidarity with the besieged population. In November 2000, in Zagreb, a conference, “Prospects of Relations between Bosnia-Herzegovina, the Republic of Croatia and the FRY” was convened. The conference gathered more than a hundred NGOs from the nations ratifying the Dayton Agreement. The participating organizations agreed to formally join their efforts to stimulate the normalization of relations among the three countries. At the second session of the conference, held in Novi Sad, 2001, the Igman Initiative was established and a Council was appointed. The new institution would speed up the process of normalizing the relations. The Igman Initiative is now governed by four co-Presidents from Croatia, BiH, Serbia and Montenegro and its Council is currently composed of twenty members, five per country. The Igman Initiative efforts are essentially still aimed at establishing good neighbourly relations, building mutual trust and tolerance and overcoming all types of discrimination in the countries of the region.

== Gallery ==
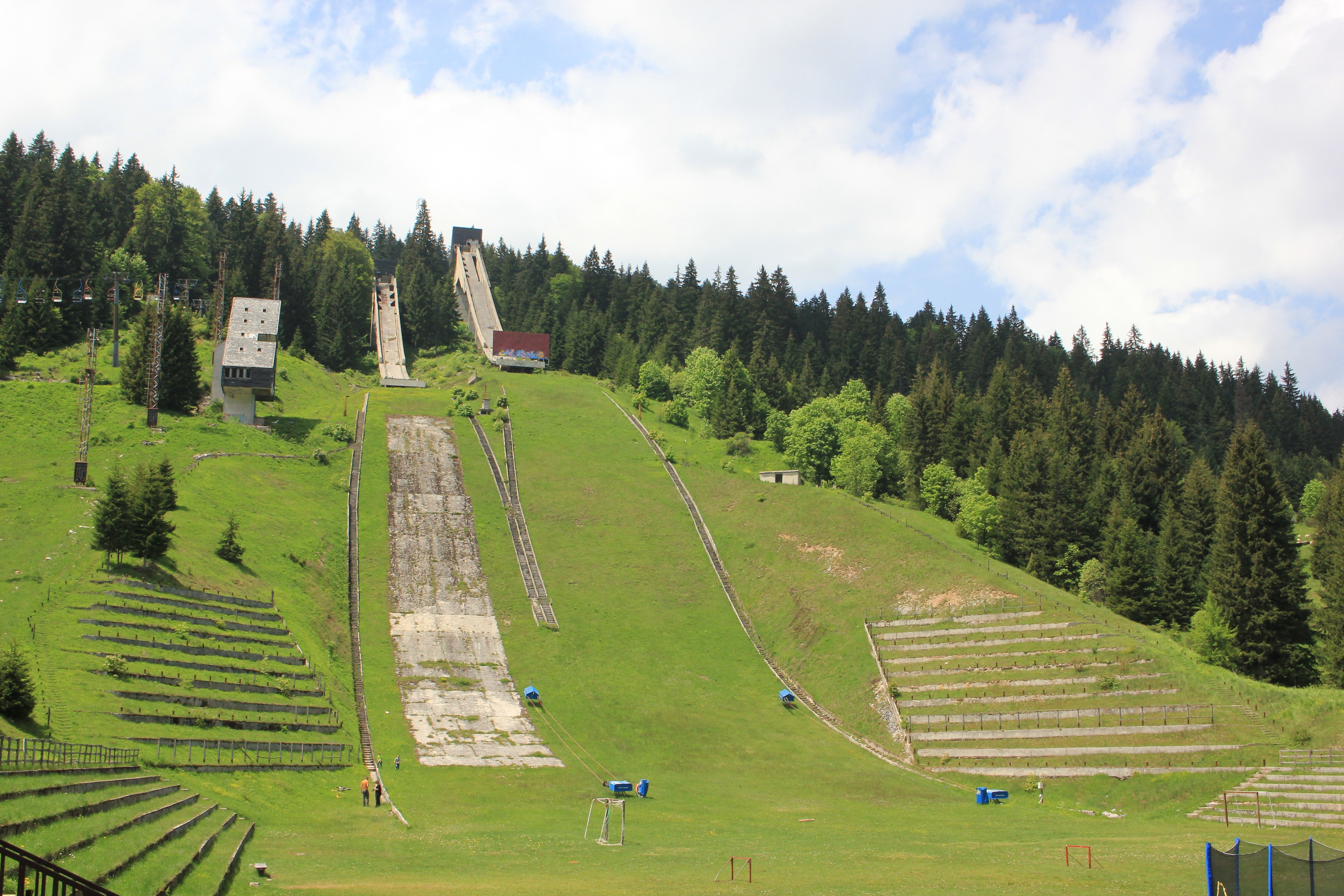
Ski jumping hills on Igman in spring

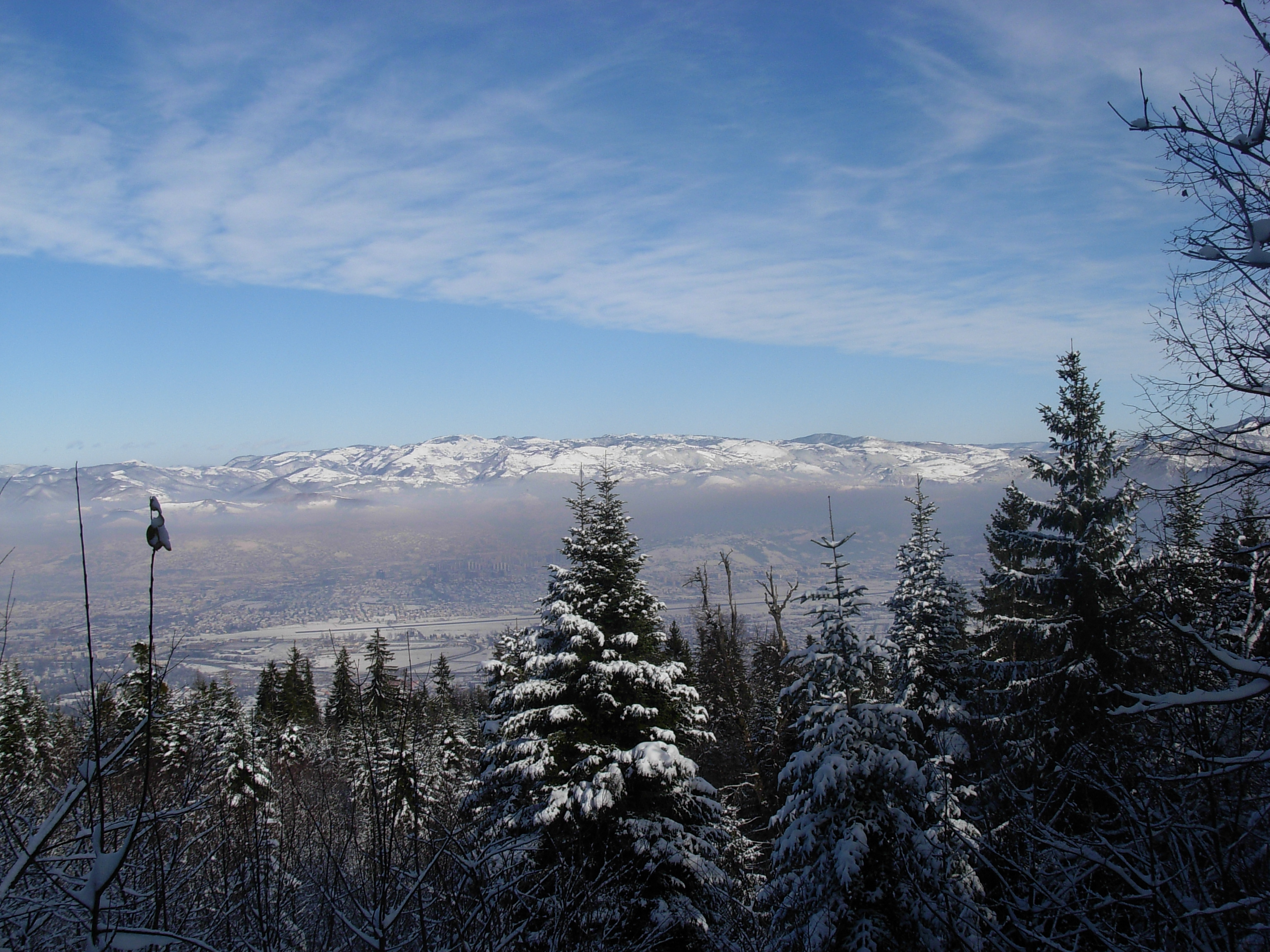
Sarajevo seen from Igman

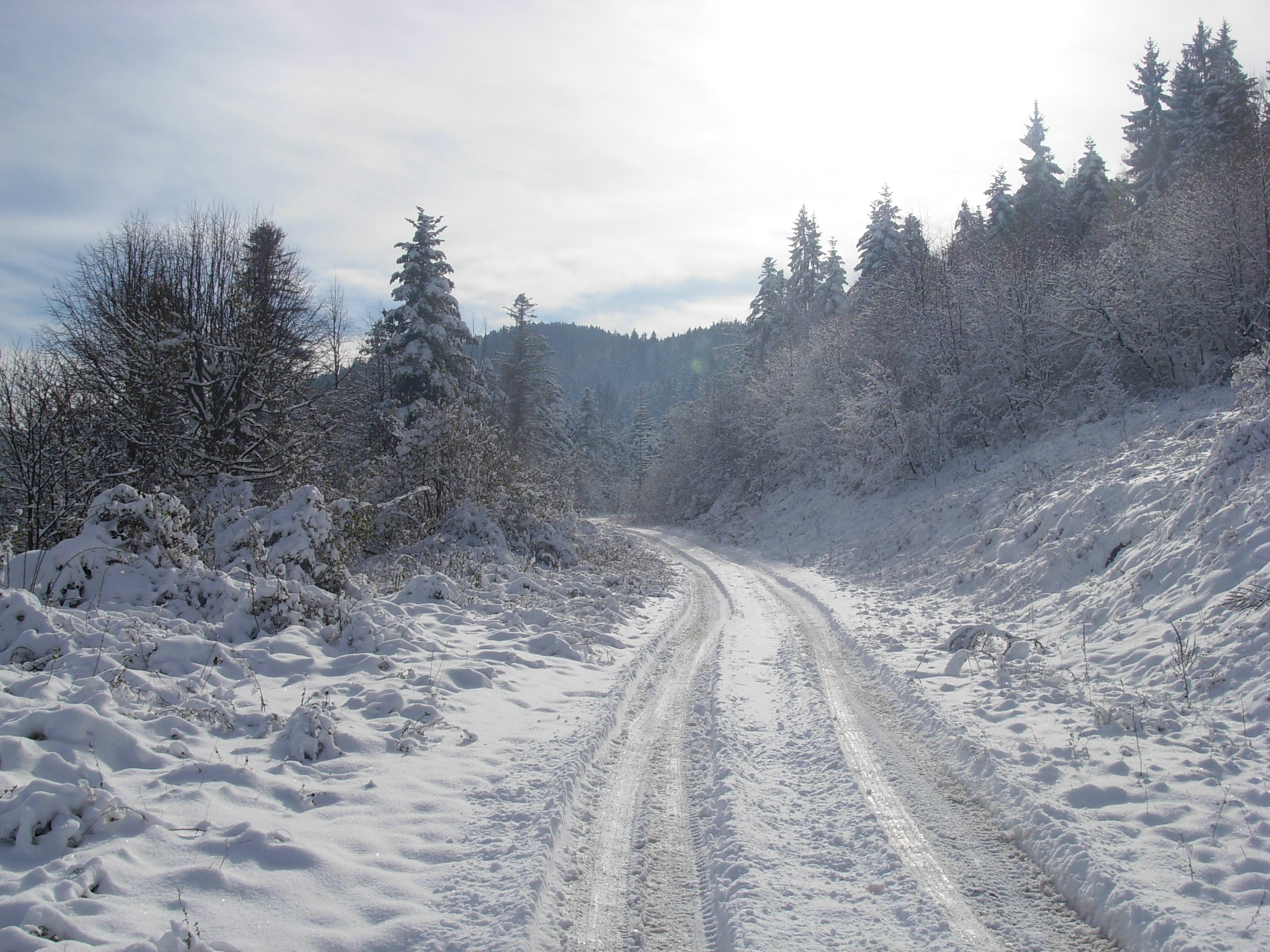
Igman The former wartime supply road

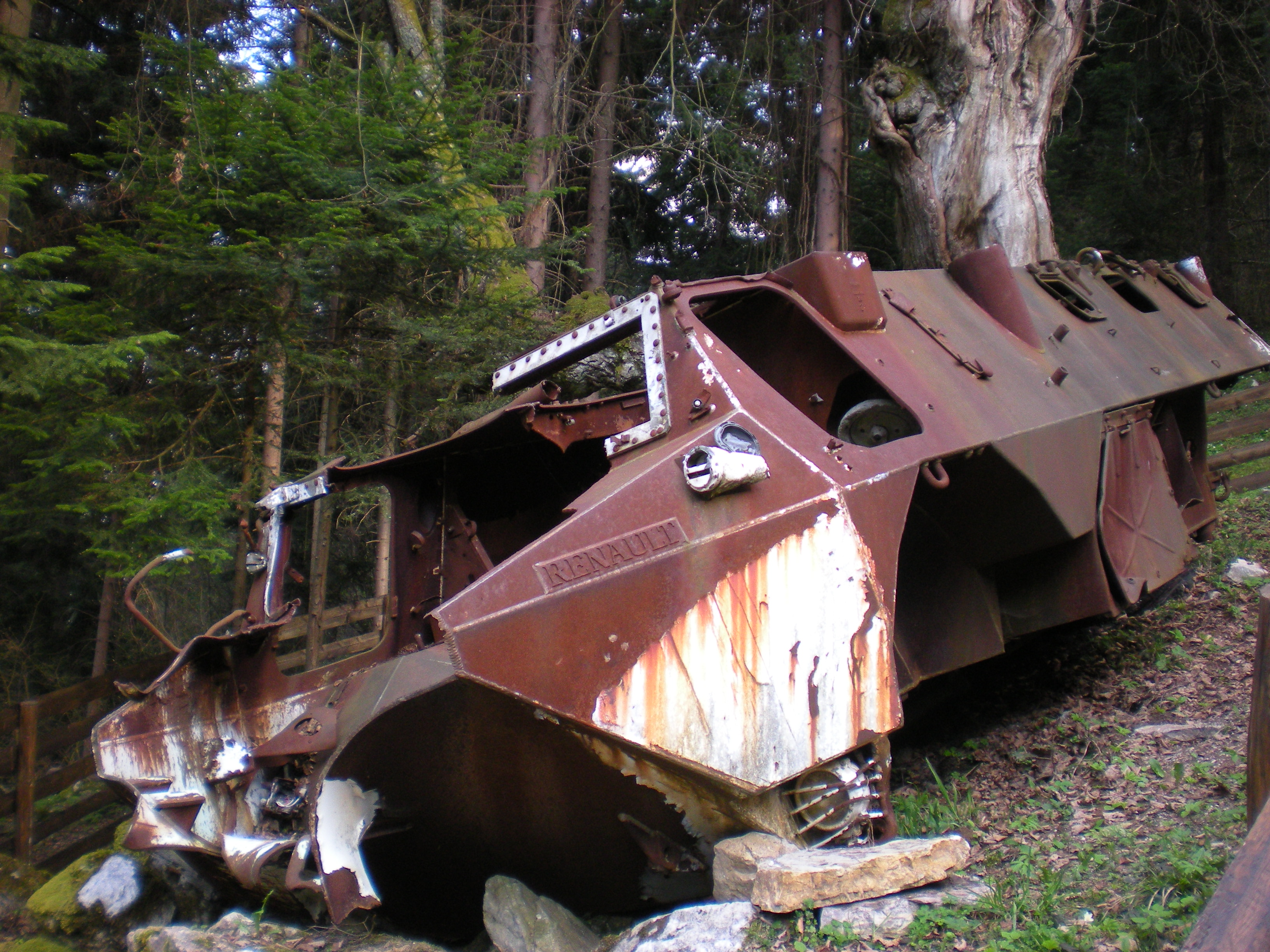
Mt Igman French APC in which members of 1995 US Peace Mission perished.

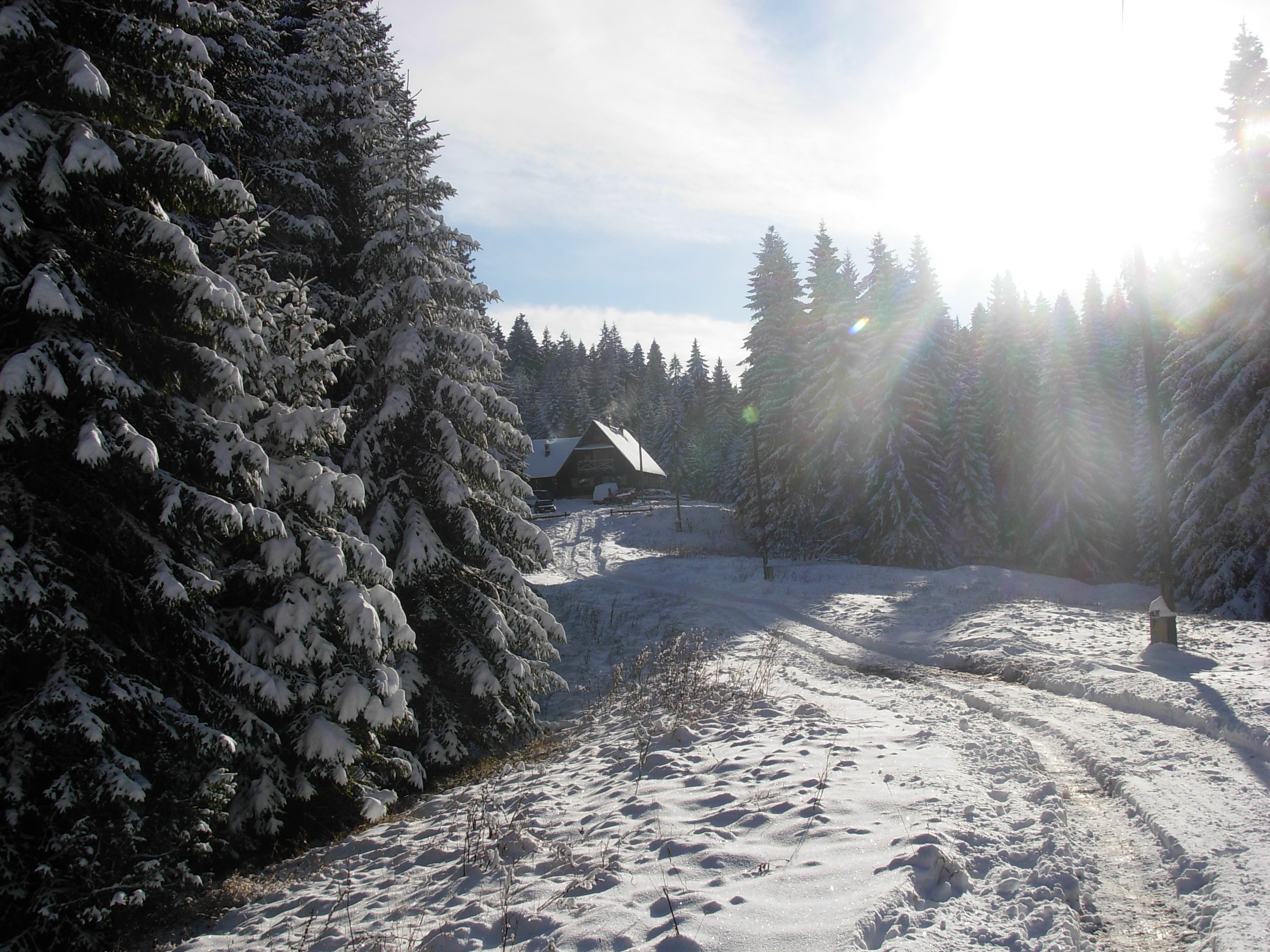
Igman Hrasnicki Stan

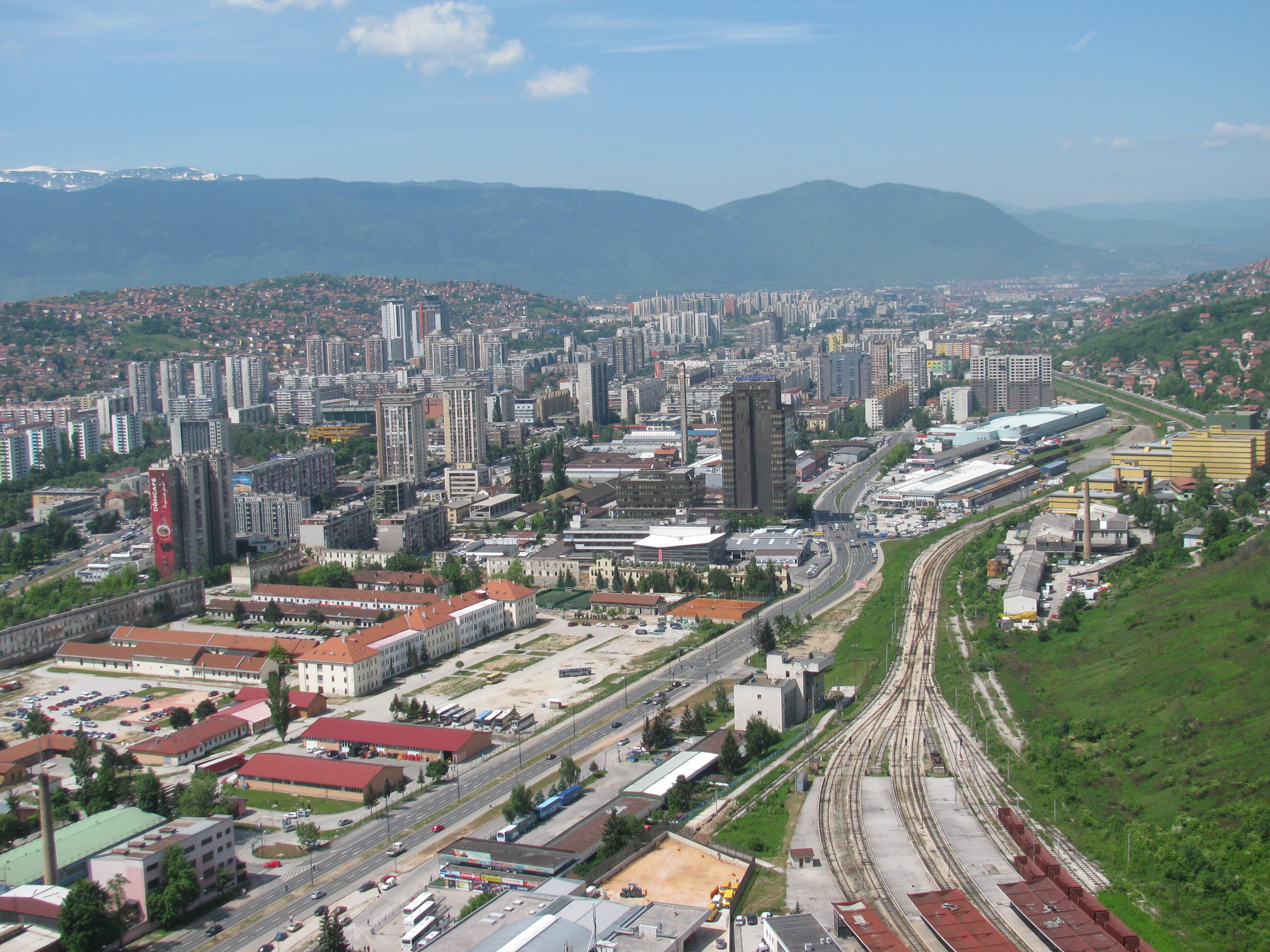
view of Mt. Igman from Sarajevo

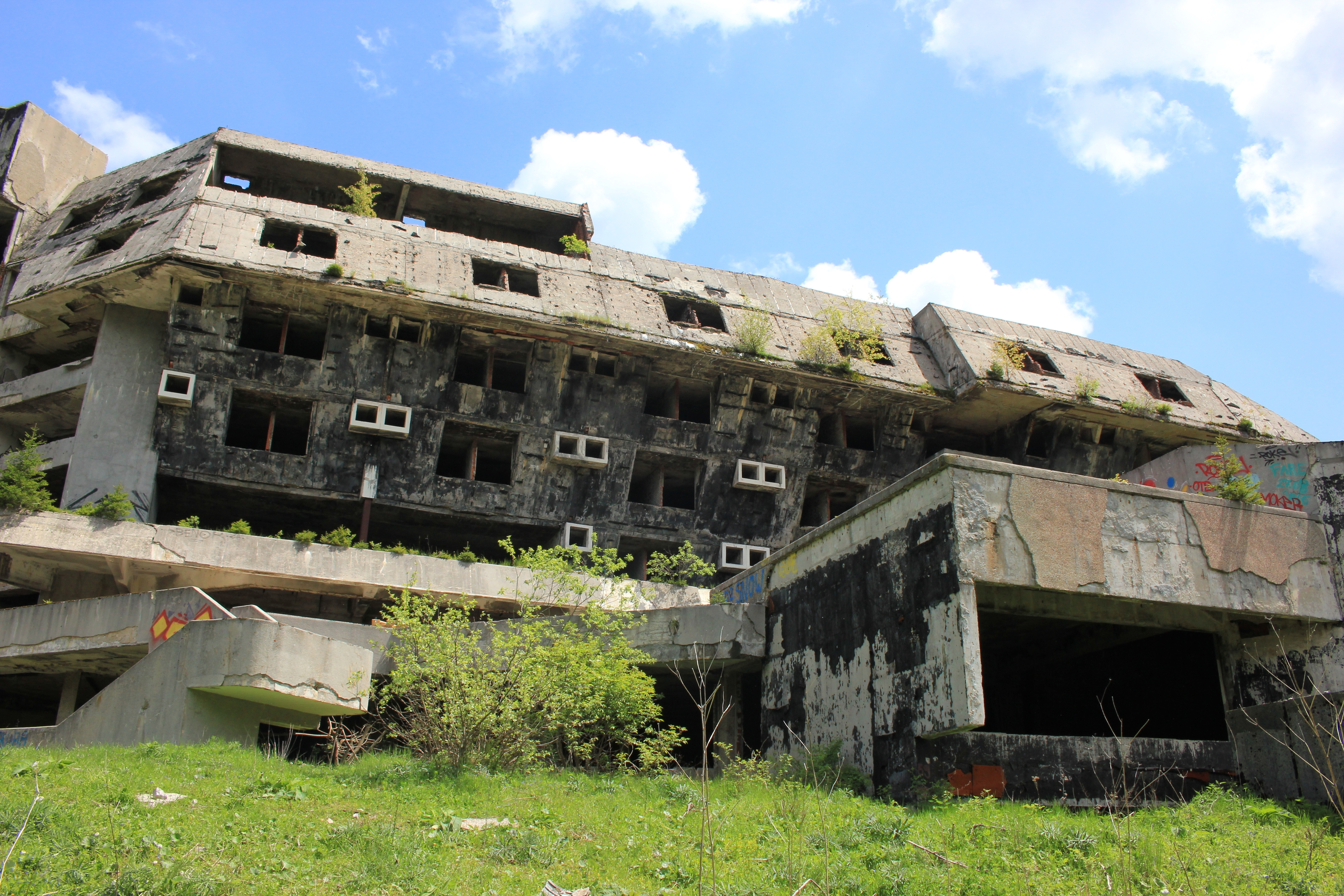
Ruins of Hotel Igman on the mountain

== Bibliography ==
- Guber, Mihovil (1943). "Pustošenje planinarskih objekata u južnoj Hrvatskoj" [The Desolation of Mountain Objects in Southern Croatia] (PDF). Hrvatski planinar (in Croatian). Vol. 39, no. 6–7. pp. 85–93. ISSN 0354-0650.
