= Ravna Vala =

Primeval forest in Bosnia and Herzegovina

Ravna Vala Prašuma Ravna Vala
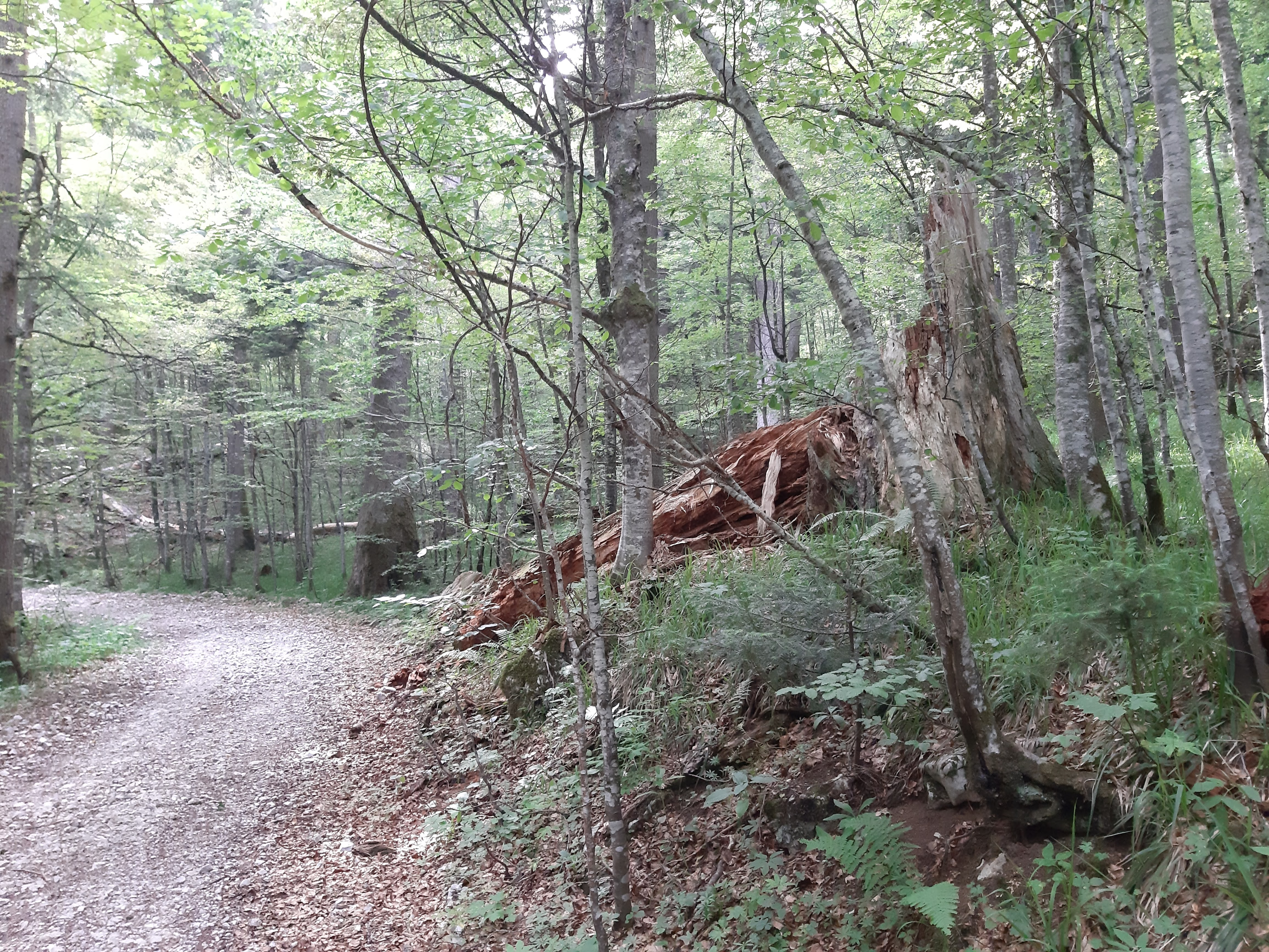
- Ravna Vala in 2021
- Interactive map of Ravna Vala

Geography
- Location: Bosnia and Herzegovina
- Coordinates: 43°43′26.43″N 18°16′23.55″E
- Elevation: 1280 – 1450 m
- Area: 45.04 ha (111.3 acres)

Administration
- Established: 1978

Ravna Vala is a primeval forest located on the mountains Igman and Bjelašnica in Bosnia and Herzegovina, about 20 km south-west of Sarajevo.

It was scientifically documented for the first time in 1978. Ravna Vala was first delineated as a virgin-forest reserve in 1978 and remains one of the best-studied old-growth beech–fir stands in the Dinaric Alps.

== Geology ==
Ravna Vala occupies a high-mountain segment of the Dinaric Alps, where the bedrock is dominated by folded Triassic and Jurassic carbonates. These consist chiefly of thick sequences of limestone and dolomite that were deformed during the Alpine orogeny, giving rise to steep, north-easterly slopes and a well-developed karst landscape. A permanent 1 hectare research plot (and 46 temporary circular plots of 12.5 m radius) have been systematically laid out across the 45 hectare Ravna Vala reserve.

Quaternary glacial and periglacial action left a veneer of moraine debris over much of the carbonate massif. On this mixed substrate, soils are typically shallow and calcareous—rendzinas directly on limestone and dolomite outcrops or calcaric cambisols where a thin mantle of glacial till has accumulated. In more protected depressions, slightly deeper kalkomelanosols may form. The mean annual temperature is about 6 °C and precipitation about 1,600 mm, with soils ranging from shallow rendzinas on bare limestone to calcaric cambisols in moraine-mantled hollows and occasional kalkomelanosols in sheltered depressions.

== Biodiversity ==
Ravna Vala is located at an altitude of 1280 to 1450 meters on an area of 45 ha. The geological base is limestone-dolomite on which very heterogeneous soils have been developed. The main forest species are fir and beech, but spruce, maple and other deciduous trees occur in the admixture.

In addition to other wild animals, there is also a brown bear, which is the largest wild animal in Bosnia and Herzegovina.

Ravna Vala lies on the north-eastern slopes of Mount Bjelašnica at elevations of 1,280–1,440 m and belongs to the Dinaric beech–fir–spruce forest association (Abieti–Fagetum dinaricum). In 2005, Vladimir Beus and Sead Vojniković carried out systematic surveys on thirty 4 m^{2} plots each in both virgin and neighbouring managed stands. They recorded 54 plant species in the old-growth plots and 56 in the managed plots, comprising five canopy-forming trees (European beech (Fagus sylvatica), silver fir (Abies alba), Norway spruce (Picea abies), sycamore maple (Acer pseudoplatanus) and rowan (Sorbus aucuparia), six to eight shrub species and over forty herb-layer species. Ground-layer cover was dominated by wood fescue (Festuca altissima), which reached at least 60 per cent canopy cover on 36 plots in both stand types; other abundant herbs included wood anemone (Anemone nemorosa) and bulbous bittercress (Cardamine bulbifera), all showing comparable cover values in old-growth and managed stands.

The similarity in species richness and understory structure between the two stand types suggests that the selective logging carried out in 1983 did not significantly alter the site's microclimate or soil conditions. This finding indicates that, under careful management, the high-altitude beech–fir–spruce forests of the Dinaric Alps can retain their native floristic biodiversity over the long term. Re-surveys of the 1 ha plot in 1978, 1988 and 2008 showed total stem count rising from 346 to 478 trees, driven by a near-threefold increase in beech in the smallest diameter class and a halving of fir in the same classes—evidence that beech is gradually supplanting fir under current climate trends.
