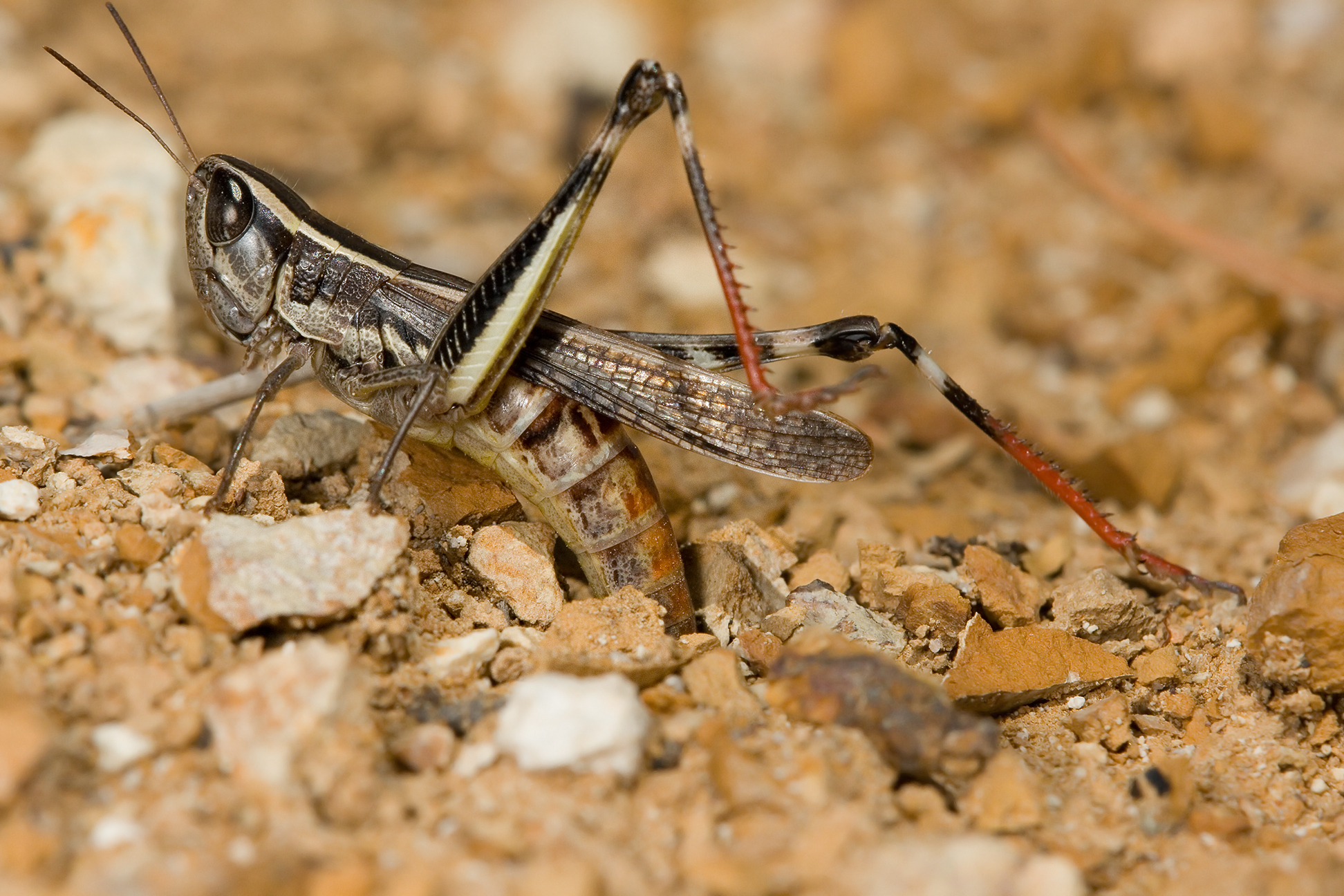
- Macrotona australis, female laying eggs

Scientific classification
- Kingdom: Animalia
- Phylum: Arthropoda
- Clade: Pancrustacea
- Class: Insecta
- Order: Orthoptera
- Suborder: Caelifera
- Family: Acrididae
- Subfamily: Catantopinae
- Tribe: Catantopini
- Genus: Macrotona; Brunner von Wattenwyl, 1893

= Macrotona =

Genus of grasshoppers

Macrotona is a genus of grasshoppers in the family Acrididae and tribe Catantopini. It includes eight described species and around 35 undescribed species. They are often found in association with spinifex.

== Species ==
List of Orthoptera Species File:

- Macrotona australis (Walker, 1870)
- Macrotona curvicostalis (Sjöstedt, 1921)
- Macrotona genicularis (Sjöstedt, 1921)
- Macrotona lineosa (Walker, 1870)
- Macrotona mjobergi Sjöstedt, 1920
- Macrotona modesta (Sjöstedt, 1921)
- Macrotona picta (Sjöstedt, 1920)
- Macrotona securiformis (Sjöstedt, 1921)
