= Bjelašnica =

Mountain in central Bosnia and Herzegovina

- Бјелашница
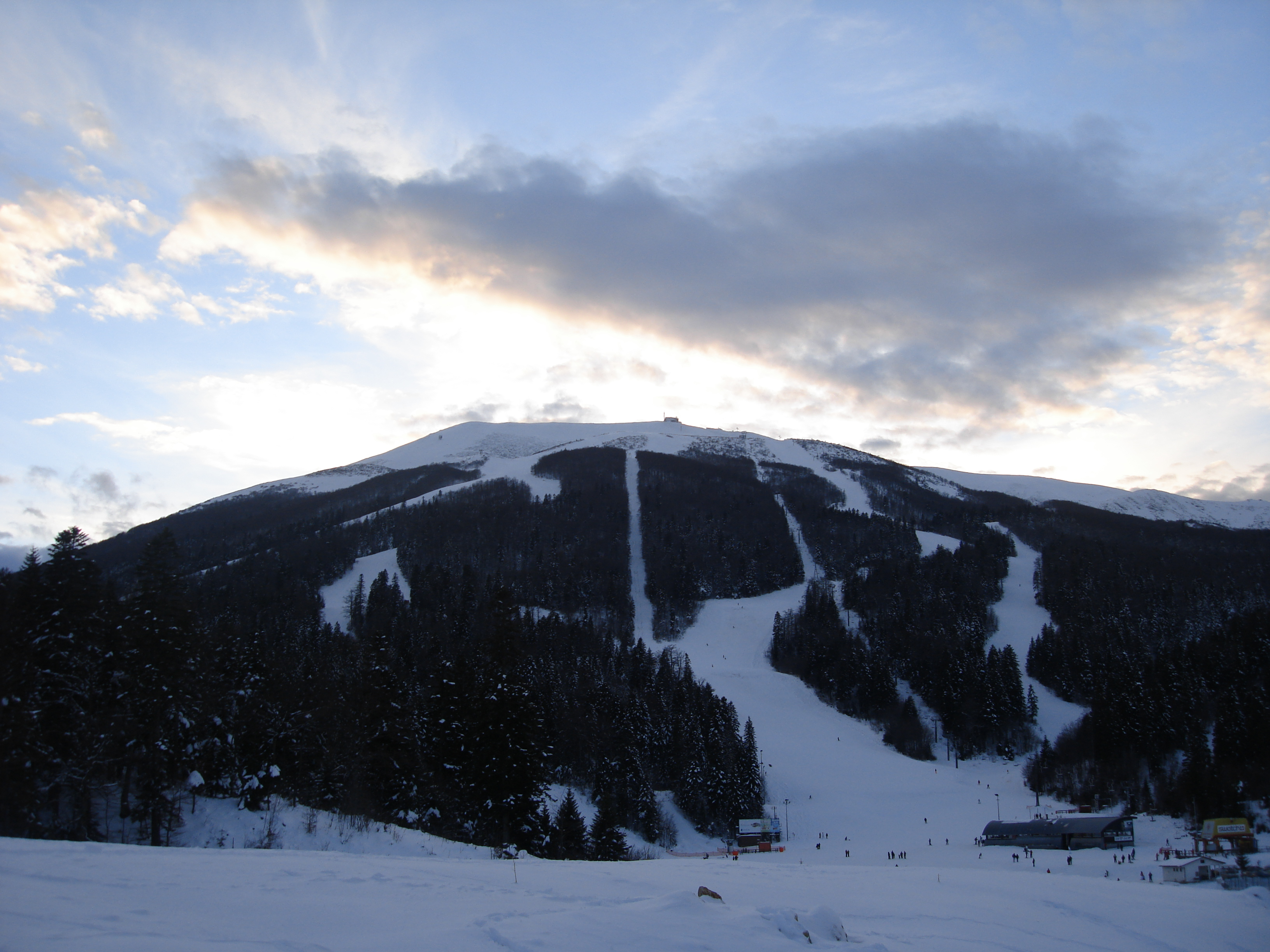
- The ski resort at Bjelašnica

Highest point
- Elevation: 2,067 m (6,781 ft)
- Prominence: 655 m (2,149 ft)
- Isolation: 13.98 km (8.69 mi)
- Coordinates: 43°42′14″N 18°15′25″E

Geography
- Location within Bosnia and Herzegovina
- Location: Bosnia and Herzegovina
- Parent range: Dinaric Alps

Bjelašnica (Serbian Cyrillic: Бјелашница, pronounced [bjělaːʃnit͡sa]) is a mountain in the Dinaric Alps in central Bosnia and Herzegovina. It is to the southwest of Sarajevo, bordering Mount Igman. Bjelašnica's tallest peak, by which the mountain group got its name, rises to an elevation of 2,067 metres (6,781 ft). Other notable peaks are Krvavac (2,061 m (6,762 ft)), Mali Vlahinja (2,055 m (6,742 ft)), and Hranisava (1,964 m (6,444 ft)). The Bjelašnica range is bordered by the Rakitnica in the south, the Neretva in the west, Mount Igman in the north-east and Mount Ivan in the north-west. Only at 20 minutes distance of Sarajevo, it is a tourist attraction for hiking and skiing. Several small mountain lakes and ponds exist on Bjelašnica, of which Blatačko and Lokvanjsko are most significant.

Bjelašnica was, in certain areas, the site of extensive combat during the 1992–95 Siege of Sarajevo and particular areas pose a high mine risk. There are numerous trails set up and maintained by local mountain clubs that lead to the bald peaks higher up. The mountain is also visited by mountain bikers and has become a base for some paragliders.

== Etymology ==
The mountain's name stems from the root bijel, which means "white".

== Geology ==
Geologically, Bjelašnica is part of the Dinaric Alps and formed largely of secondary and tertiary sedimentary rock, mostly limestone and dolomite.

== Climate and vegetation ==
The white snow cupola of Bjelašnica is a familiar sight from the higher points in Sarajevo from mid-October until early June. Bjelašnica's base is largely forested with mostly beech. However, there are no trees above the 1,500 metre tree line.

Bjelašnica has an alpine tundra climate (ET) with long, cold winters lasting for most of the year and short, cool summers. During winter, snowfall is extremely heavy and very constant, falling on most winter days.

Climate data for Bjelašnica (1961–1990)
Month	Jan	Feb	Mar	Apr	May	Jun	Jul	Aug	Sep	Oct	Nov	Dec	Year
Record high °C (°F)	5.4 (41.7)	5.3 (41.5)	9.4 (48.9)	13.8 (56.8)	18.2 (64.8)	21.0 (69.8)	23.2 (73.8)	22.0 (71.6)	20.3 (68.5)	15.9 (60.6)	10.8 (51.4)	8.8 (47.8)	23.2 (73.8)
Mean daily maximum °C (°F)	−4.1 (24.6)	−4.3 (24.3)	−2.4 (27.7)	0.8 (33.4)	6.0 (42.8)	9.9 (49.8)	12.3 (54.1)	12.4 (54.3)	9.4 (48.9)	5.1 (41.2)	0.7 (33.3)	−2.6 (27.3)	3.6 (38.5)
Daily mean °C (°F)	−6.5 (20.3)	−6.5 (20.3)	−4.4 (24.1)	−1.2 (29.8)	3.8 (38.8)	7.2 (45.0)	9.5 (49.1)	9.6 (49.3)	6.8 (44.2)	2.8 (37.0)	−1.6 (29.1)	−4.9 (23.2)	1.2 (34.2)
Mean daily minimum °C (°F)	−8.8 (16.2)	−8.7 (16.3)	−6.5 (20.3)	−3.1 (26.4)	1.6 (34.9)	4.7 (40.5)	6.7 (44.1)	7.0 (44.6)	4.5 (40.1)	0.6 (33.1)	−3.7 (25.3)	−7.2 (19.0)	−1.1 (30.0)
Record low °C (°F)	−29.2 (−20.6)	−26.2 (−15.2)	−25.4 (−13.7)	−19.0 (−2.2)	−11.0 (12.2)	−6.4 (20.5)	−3.0 (26.6)	−3.7 (25.3)	−9.0 (15.8)	−12.2 (10.0)	−19.2 (−2.6)	−26.8 (−16.2)	−29.2 (−20.6)
Average precipitation mm (inches)	78.0 (3.07)	83.8 (3.30)	84.4 (3.32)	79.7 (3.14)	88.1 (3.47)	110.0 (4.33)	84.2 (3.31)	98.6 (3.88)	95.9 (3.78)	118.4 (4.66)	110.6 (4.35)	82.7 (3.26)	1,114.5 (43.88)
Average precipitation days (≥ 0.1 mm)	14.4	14.6	15.5	16.3	15.9	16.5	12.9	12.4	11.5	11.4	15.1	15.2	171.7
Average relative humidity (%)	85.5	87.6	88.1	88.4	85.0	85.3	81.5	80.1	81.6	82.8	84.4	85.2	84.6
Mean monthly sunshine hours	90.4	82.7	110.6	126.7	162.6	167.6	229.9	218.0	177.3	149.4	96.1	82.8	1,694.2
Percentage possible sunshine	32	29	30	32	36	37	50	51	48	45	34	30	39
Source: MeteoBiH

== Weather station ==
Bjelašnica summit is easily recognizable from a distance by the structures that have been erected on top of it. After the Austro-Hungarian Empire occupied Bosnia following the Congress of Berlin in 1878, the Austrians installed almost immediately the first meteorological station on the summit in 1878, creating the first meteorological station in the whole area of the Balkans. This structure was replaced in 1894 by a more advanced meteorological observatory with an all-year around manning. The observatory is still there, has been repaired of the damage sustained during the Bosnian war, and still functions as an important chain-link in the meteorological survey of the Balkans. The communications centre with its landmark tower that used to stand next to the observatory was destroyed in 1993. The remains of the destroyed tower were removed in 2006.

== 1984 Winter Olympics ==
During the 1984 Winter Olympics, Bjelašnica hosted the men's alpine skiing events, where brash Bill Johnson (USA) won the downhill after boldly predicting victory, overtaking Swiss ski legend Peter Müller who took silver. The American twins Phil and Steve Mahre took gold and silver in the slalom at Bjelašnica. Switzerland's Max Julen surprisingly took the gold in the Giant Slalom, while the silver went to the Yugoslav favorite Jure Franko. Major investment was done by the Yugoslav authorities in order to accommodate the Winter Olympics. The Babin Dol area was developed for the necessary construction and a long main ski lift was built from Babin Dol up to the Bjelašnica summit. In preparation of the Games, a road was constructed across the Igman plateau connecting Sarajevo through Hadžići to the Malo Polje, Veliko Polje and Babin Dol venues. The Babin Dol area has several structures dating from that time, including the renowned Maršal (then: Famos) Hotel and most of the skiing facilities in the area. FIS World Cup events took place on 18 January 1983 and 21–22 March 1987. In 1983 it was only the downhill (winner: Gerhard Pfaffenbichler, before Steve Podborski and Franz Klammer) that was done. In 1987 contests were done in Men's Slalom (winner: Grega Benedik) and Giant Slalom, Men's (winner: Marc Girardelli) and Women's (tied victory: Maria Walliser and Vreni Schneider) Other FIS events have taken place and are still taking place at Bjelašnica.

== Bosnian War (1992–95) ==
The strategic value of Bjelašnica summit, overlooking the Igman plateau, had already been recognized by the JNA and Yugoslav leadership headed by Marshal Tito. A large radar site was constructed on a subsummit of the Vlahinja ridge, while a communications centre and tower was constructed next to the weather station on the nearby Bjelašnica summit.

Bjelašnica was throughout the course of the Bosnian War an area of major strategic importance as part of the Siege of Sarajevo. The territory covered by the Bjelasnica range and the Igman plateau between Konjic and the United Nations-controlled Sarajevo Airport was from the outset of the conflict controlled by the ARBiH. By mid-1993, the central plateau of Igman came under increased Serb military pressure, when the suspicion became stronger that the area had become a major logistical artery of the besieged city, as a result of the construction of the Sarajevo tunnel.

A major VRS offensive started in July 1993 that led to the fall of Trnovo, and on 4 August 1993, Serb forces captured the Bjelašnica summit and part of the Igman supply road. The VRS advance was stopped under threat of NATO airstrikes. After tense negotiations the VRS retreated from the Bjelašnica summit, but not without blowing up the communications tower first. French United Nations Protection Force (UNPROFOR) units were stationed on Bjelašnica, and the Igman area was declared a Demilitarized Zone (DMZ) by the UN.

The situation around the frontlines in nearby Treskavica and around Babin Dol, remained explosive with violent exchanges of hostilities between VRS and ARBiH units. The villages on the southern slopes of Bjelašnica, like Umoljani and Lukavac were not in the frontline, but sustained heavy damage from shelling. Discussion about real or alleged use by ARBiH forces of the Igman DMZ was an issue of constant contention, between UNPROFOR Commander General Michael Rose, ARBiH General Rasim Delić, and VRS Commander Ratko Mladić.

By mid-1995, the military situation became very tense again, and in August 1995 the VRS launched another offensive, forcing UNPROFOR from the Bjelasnica ridge and advancing through Babin Dol towards Veliko Polje. However, after the second Markale shelling, on August, 30, NATO started Operation Deliberate Force, in which NATO aircraft engaged VRS Command & Control facilities and other targets. Also the VRS-held radar station on Vlahinja ridge was completely destroyed during these air strikes that lasted until 14 September 1995, when the air strikes were suspended to allow the implementation of the withdrawal of VRS heavy weapons from the Sarajevo exclusion zone, effectively ending the Siege of Sarajevo.

=== Mine risks ===
Extensive de-mining activities have taken place around recreational areas and especially around the existing ski runs, which can be considered safe by all means. The largest part of the Bjelašnica range remained largely spared from warfare and the mine risk is therefore minimal within the area west of the Bjelašnica summit and east of the Hranisava mountain.

== Gallery ==
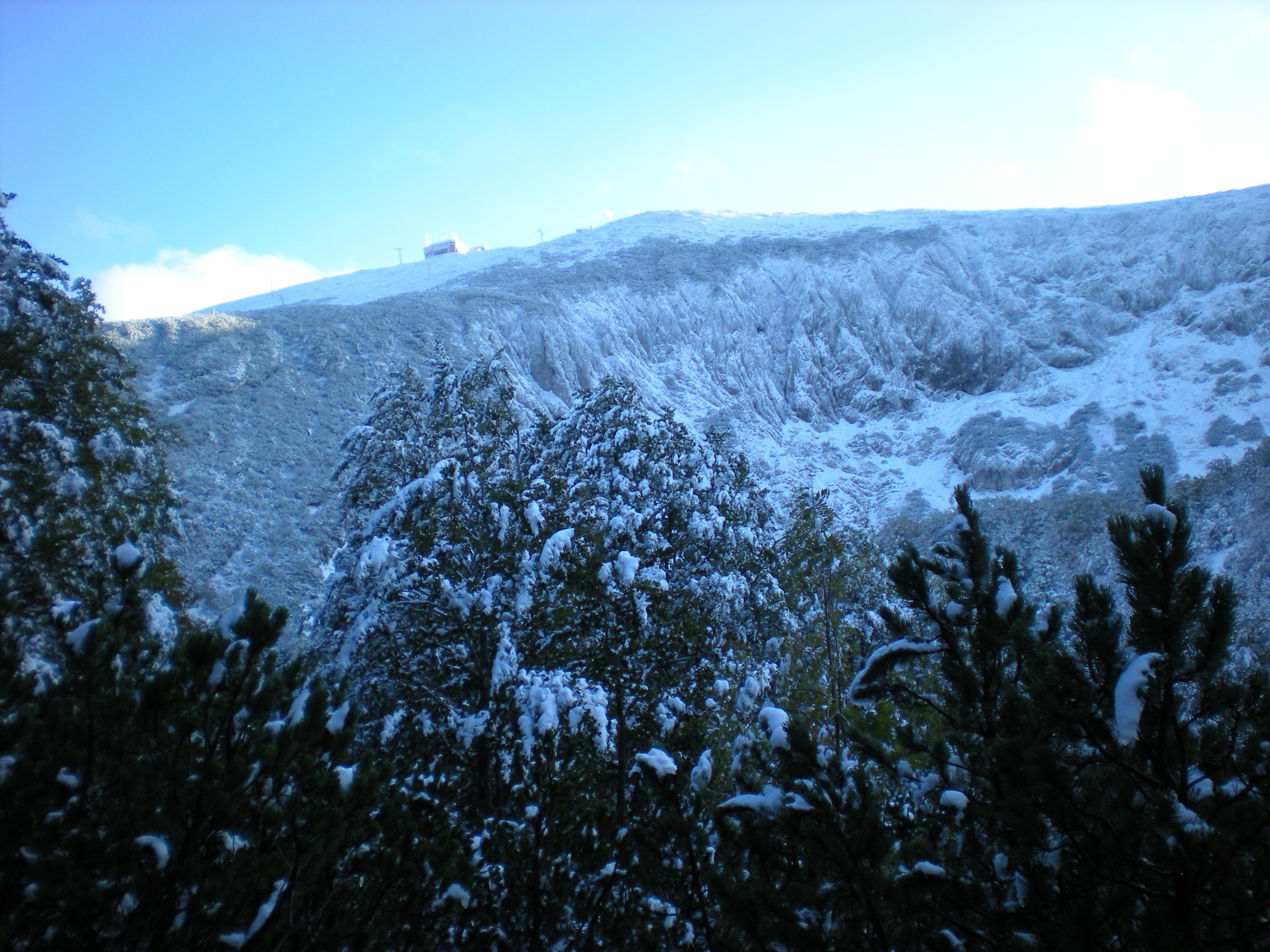
Bjelašnica summit as seen from Josipova Staze

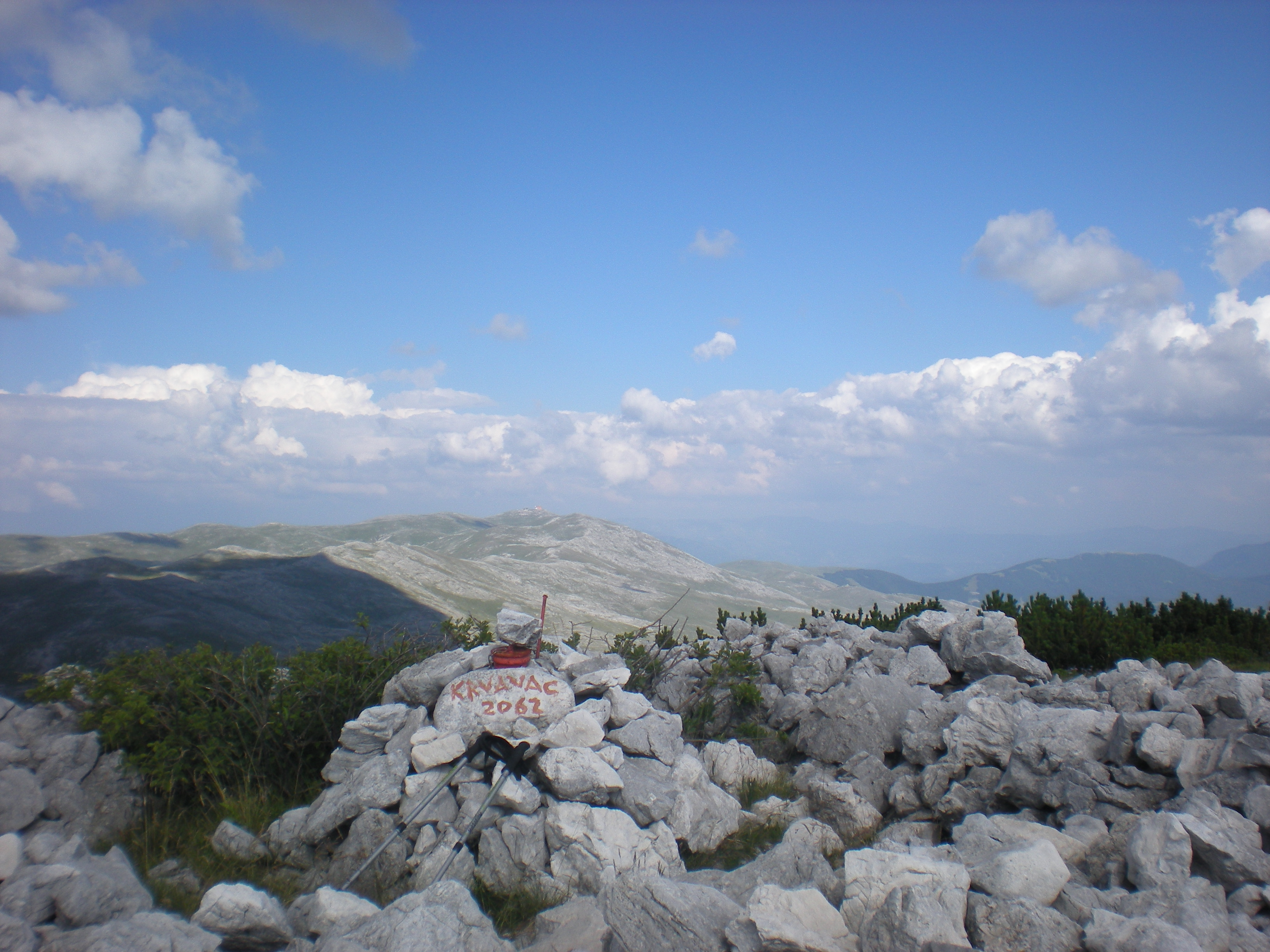
View from Krvavac summit

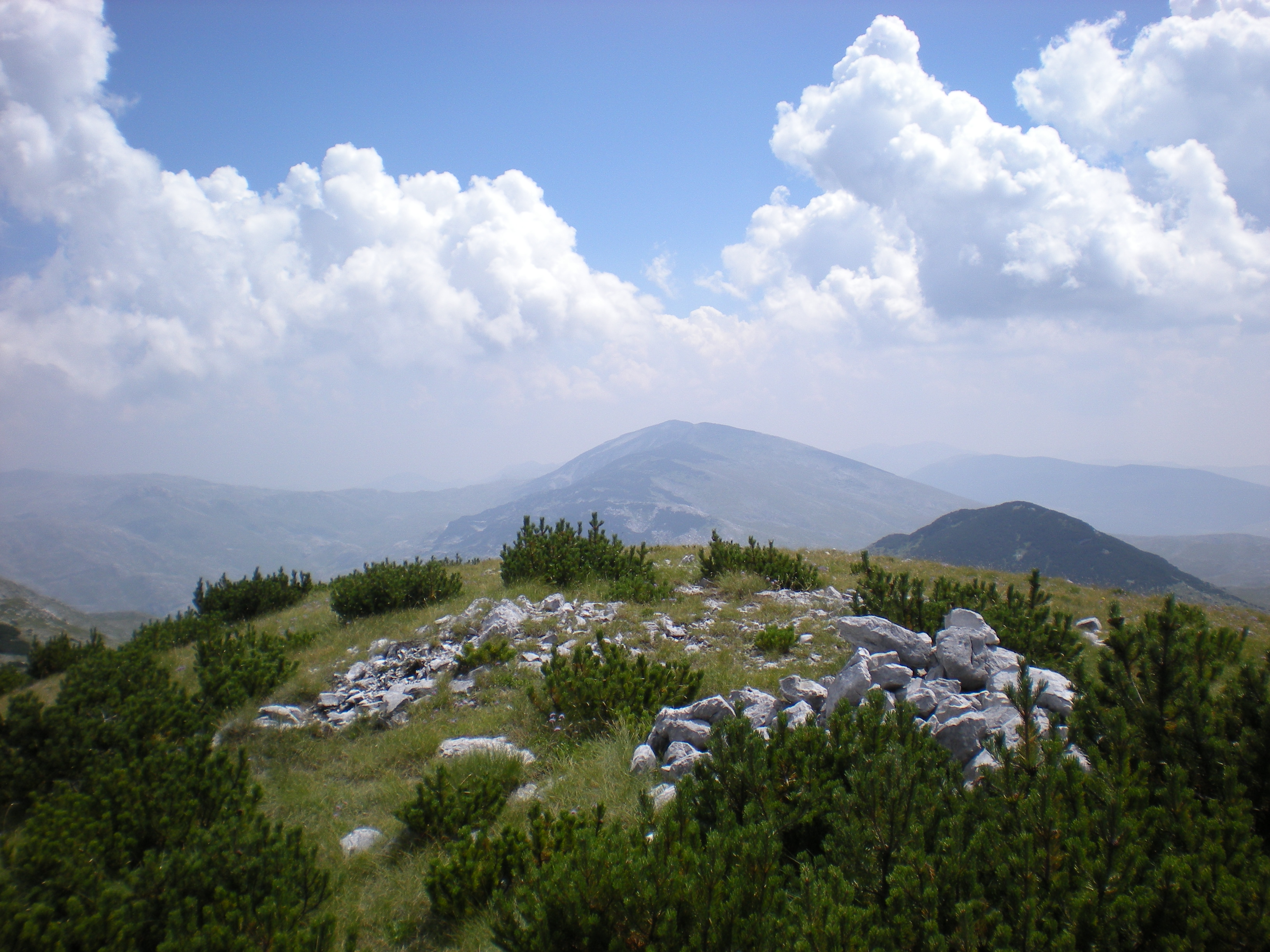
View from Hranisava summit

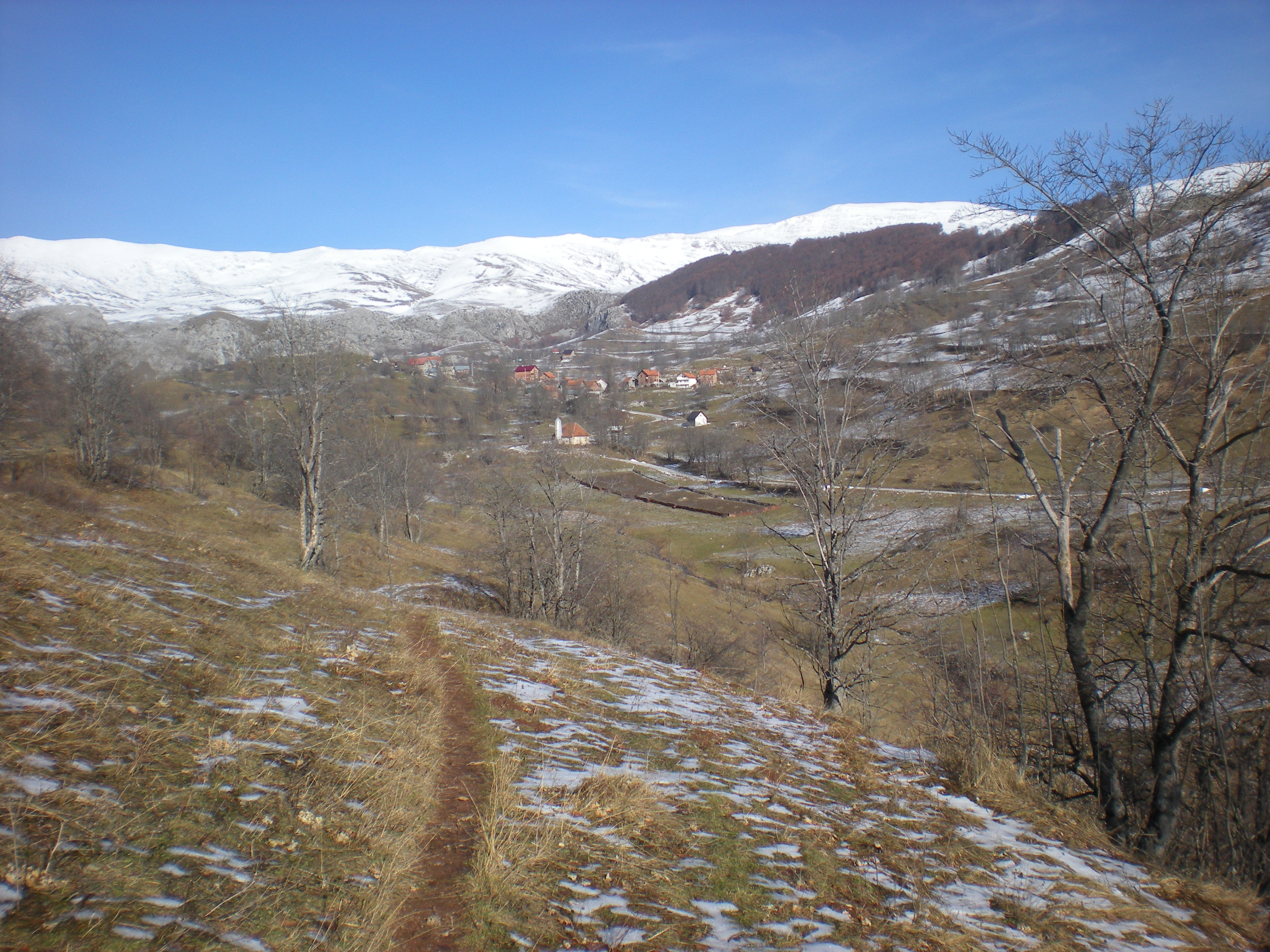
View of Umoljani and the Bjelašnica main ridge from the trail above Rakitnica Canyon

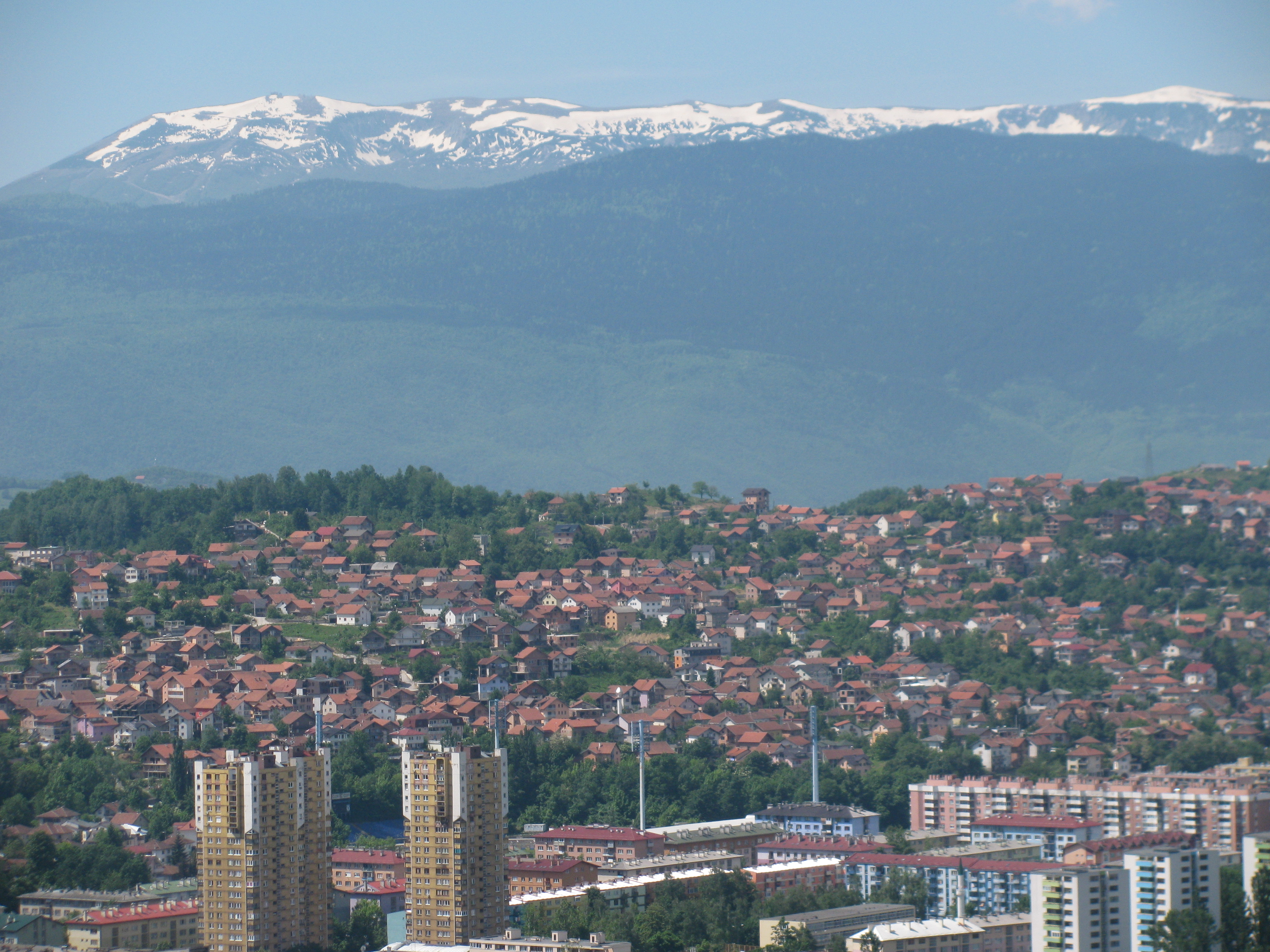
Mount Bjelašnica (snowy peaks) view from Sarajevo

== Bjelašnica Olympic Mountain Ski Centre ==
The Bjelašnica Olympic Mountain Ski Centre and its facilities are all located on the eastern slope of Bjelašnica main summit. There are 6 lifts, with one modern six-seat carrier lift departing from Babin Dol, one four-seater lift, three anchor lifts and two remaining single saucer lifts. Next to the original 3100 meter Olympic Downhill run and the Giant Slalom run there are four more pistes varying in length between 3200 and 550 meters and covering all difficulty levels between blue-red-black. A lot of investment has been done to develop the Ski Centre and the Babin Dol area since the era directly following the Dayton Agreement, with another peak during the last couple of years. New hotels, apartment complexes and restaurants have turned this area into a modern ski resort. The latest redevelopment has seen the replacement of the old ski lift with two modern ski lifts and a state of the art snow production system, ready to operate for the 2017/2018 ski season. This was done as part of the preparations for the 2019 European Youth Olympic Winter Festival, which was hosted by Sarajevo and Istočno Sarajevo in February 2019.

== Hiking ==
The Bjelašnica range consists of basically three ridges, the Vlahinja ridge, the Strug ridge and a more southern ridge parallel to the Rakitnica and separated from the other ridges by a wide valley called Dugo Polje. A number of hikes exist in these mountains. One trail approaches the Bjelašnica main summit (2,067 m.) from the north and is called Josipova Staza after one of the founders of Bosnian and Herzegovinian alpinism: Josip Sigmund. From the main summit a ridge walk leads north-east towards the summit of Mala Vlahinja (2,055 m.). The last summit of this ridge in the west is called Hranisava (1,964 m.) and can be better ascended to by a trail starting in the hamlet of Lokve, between Hadžići and Pazarić. This offers a hike towards a view from this most western summit of the Bjelašnica range. Another hike departs from Dugo Polje and leads via a difficultly retrieved trail through thick shrubs of Pinus Mugo the summit of Krvavac (2,061 m.). One of the hikes leads parallel to the Rakitnica Canyon, departing from Umoljani and ending at Lukomir, known to be the last all-year-through inhabited semi-nomadic settlement at this altitude in the Balkans. There is quite a number of well equipped mountain huts to be found within this mountain group. Stanari P.D. (1,540 m.) is an excellent base for hikes in the central-western part of the mountain range. There are other mountain huts at Sitnik, Umoljani and Lukomir that might require prior reservation.

== See also ==
- Tourism in Bosnia and Herzegovina

== Bibliography ==
=== History ===
- Guber, Mihovil (1943). "Pustošenje planinarskih objekata u južnoj Hrvatskoj" [The Desolation of Mountain Objects in Southern Croatia] (PDF). Hrvatski planinar (in Croatian). Vol. 39, no. 6–7. pp. 85–93. ISSN 0354-0650.

=== Alpinism bibliography ===
- Poljak, Željko (February 1959). "Bjelašnica". Kazalo za "Hrvatski planinar" i "Naše planine" 1898—1958 (PDF). Naše planine (in Croatian). Vol. XI. p. 23. ISSN 0354-0650.
