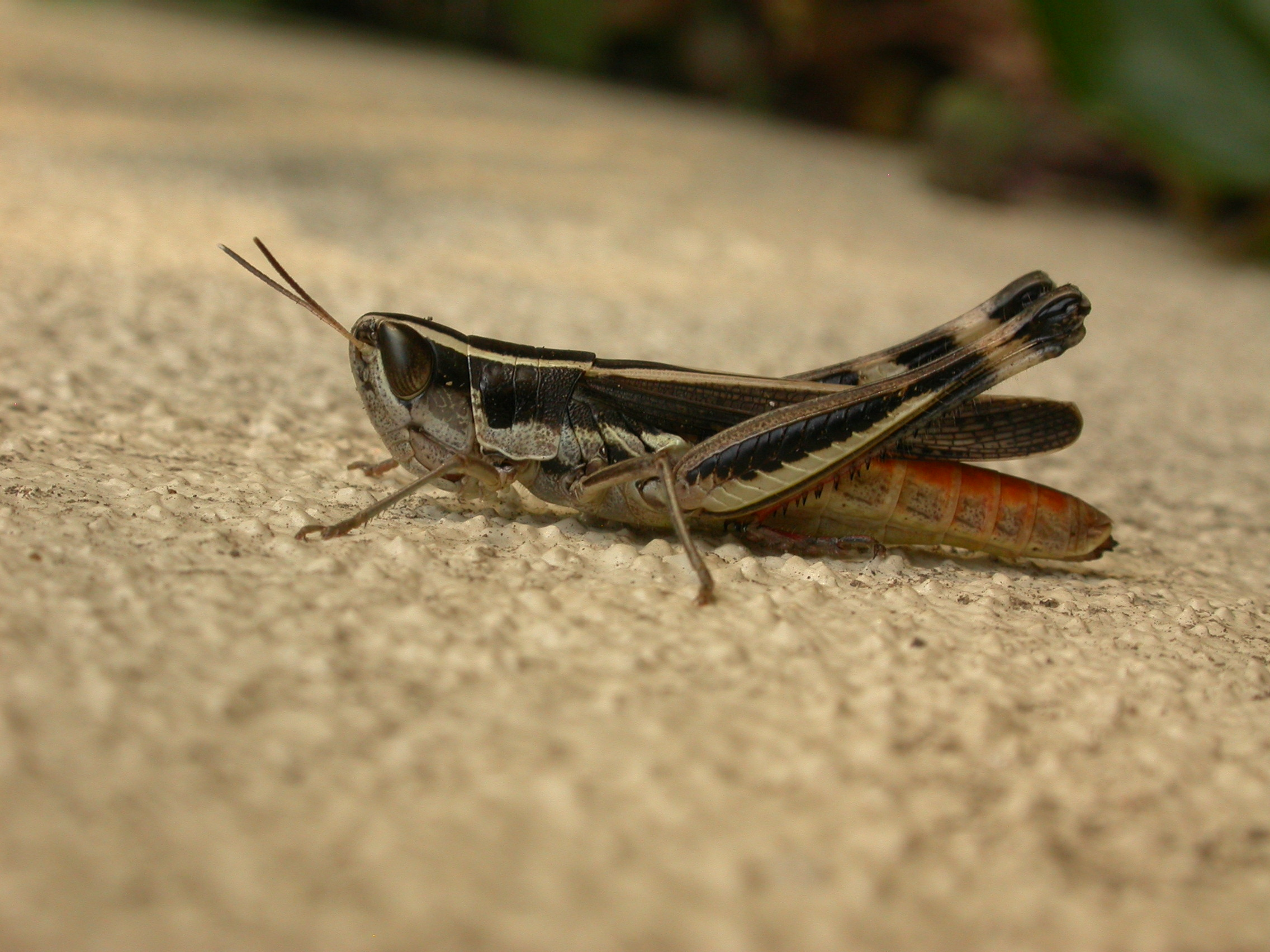
- Macrotona securiformis, Inland Macrotona

Scientific classification
- Kingdom: Animalia
- Phylum: Arthropoda
- Clade: Pancrustacea
- Class: Insecta
- Order: Orthoptera
- Suborder: Caelifera
- Family: Acrididae
- Subfamily: Catantopinae
- Tribe: Catantopini
- Genus: Macrotona
- Species: M. securiformis

Binomial name
- Macrotona securiformis (Sjöstedt, 1921)

Synonyms
- Eumacrotona securiformis Sjöstedt, 1921

= Macrotona securiformis =

Species of grasshopper

Macrotona securiformis, the Inland Macrotona, is a species of short-horned grasshopper in the family Acrididae, first described in 1921 by Bror Yngve Sjöstedt, as Eumacrotona securiformis. It is found in Australia.
