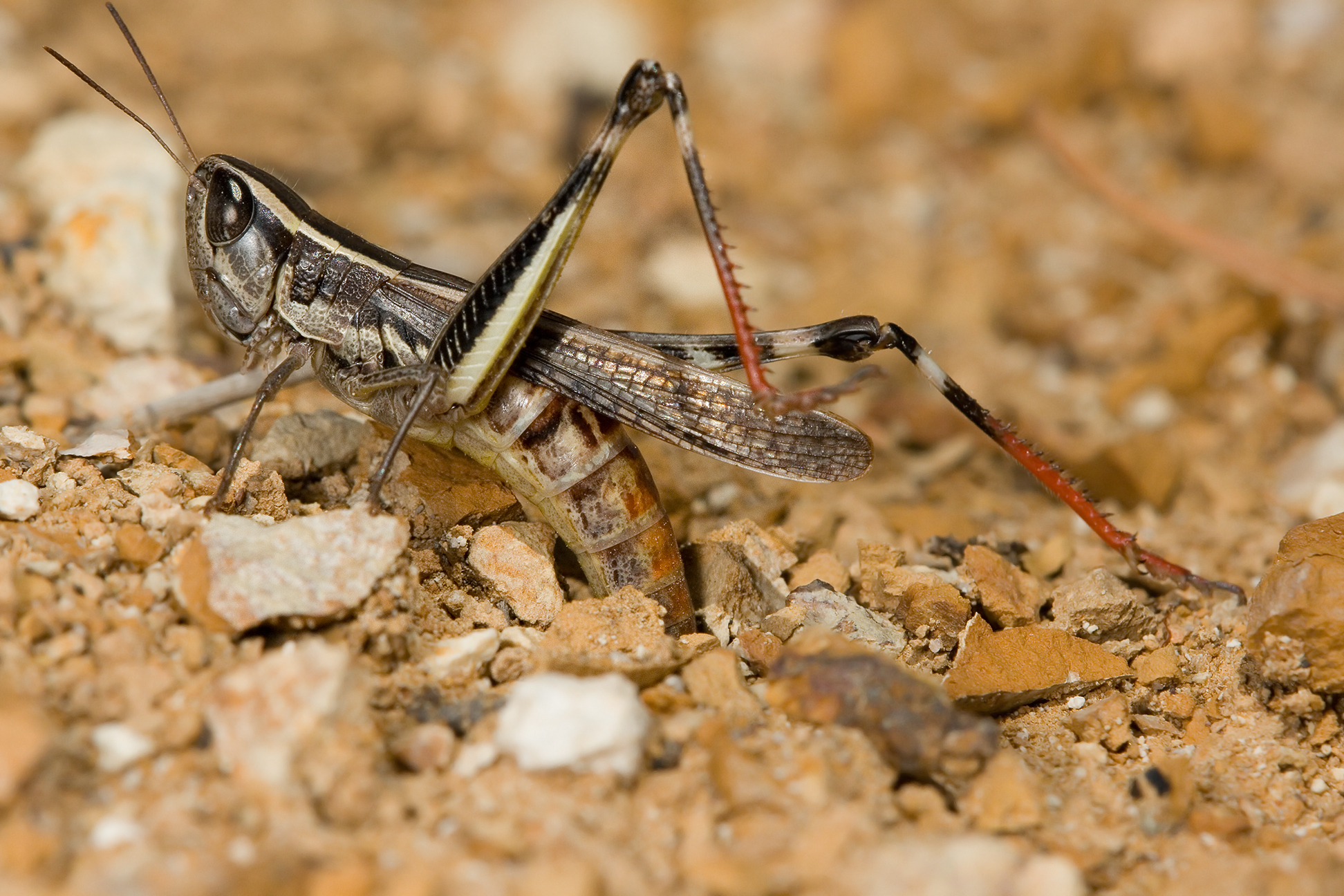
- Female, laying eggs

Scientific classification
- Kingdom: Animalia
- Phylum: Arthropoda
- Clade: Pancrustacea
- Class: Insecta
- Order: Orthoptera
- Suborder: Caelifera
- Family: Acrididae
- Genus: Macrotona
- Species: M. australis

Binomial name
- Macrotona australis (Walker, 1870)

= Common macrotona =

Species of grasshopper

The common macrotona (Macrotona australis) is found in southern and eastern Australia.

== Taxes ==
Macrotona australis was first described by Francis Walker in 1870. Synonyms include Eumacrotona bella, Eumacrotona simplex, Heteracris australis, Macrotona gracilis, Macrotona lineola.

== Description ==
Size ranges from 1.7 to 3.0 cm (0.67 to 1.18 in). Colour varies from red to grey. Most individuals have a bronze colouring behind the rear legs.

== Distribution and habitat ==
Its presence has been verified across mainland Australia and Tasmania.

It is commonly found with spinifex grass in heath habitats.
