= Sarajevo Tunnel =

Tunnel

- Sarajevo Tunnel
- Coordinates: 43°49′11″N 18°20′14″E

Characteristics
- Design: Tunnel

History
- Construction start: 1 March 1993

Location
- Interactive map of Sarajevo Tunnel

The Sarajevo Tunnel (Bosnian: Sarajevski Tunel) also known as the Tunnel of Salvation (Bosnian: Tunel spasa), the Tunnel of Hope, or the Tunnel of Life, was a tunnel constructed between March and June 1993 during the Siege of Sarajevo in the midst of the Bosnian War. It was built by the Army of the Republic of Bosnia and Herzegovina (ARBiH) in order to link the city of Sarajevo, which was entirely cut off by the Army of Republika Srpska (VRS), with ARBiH-held territory on the other side of the Sarajevo Airport, an area controlled by the United Nations.

The tunnel linked the Sarajevo neighbourhoods of Dobrinja and Butmir (giving it the name "Tunnel D-B"), allowing food, war supplies, and humanitarian aid to come into the city, and allowing people to get out. The tunnel became a major way of bypassing the international arms embargo and providing the city defenders with weaponry.

== Background ==
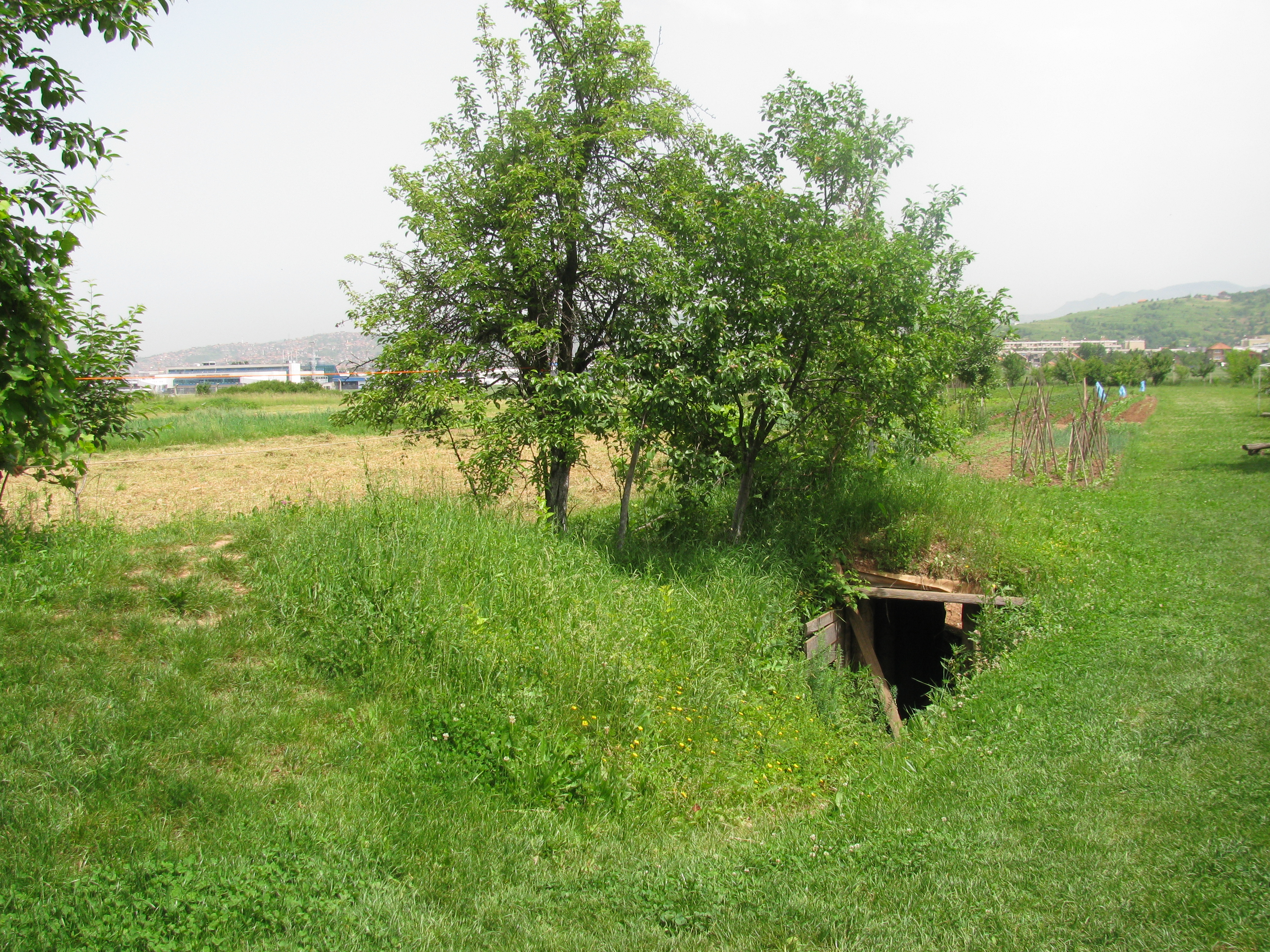
The tunnel's south entrance, outside the siege lines

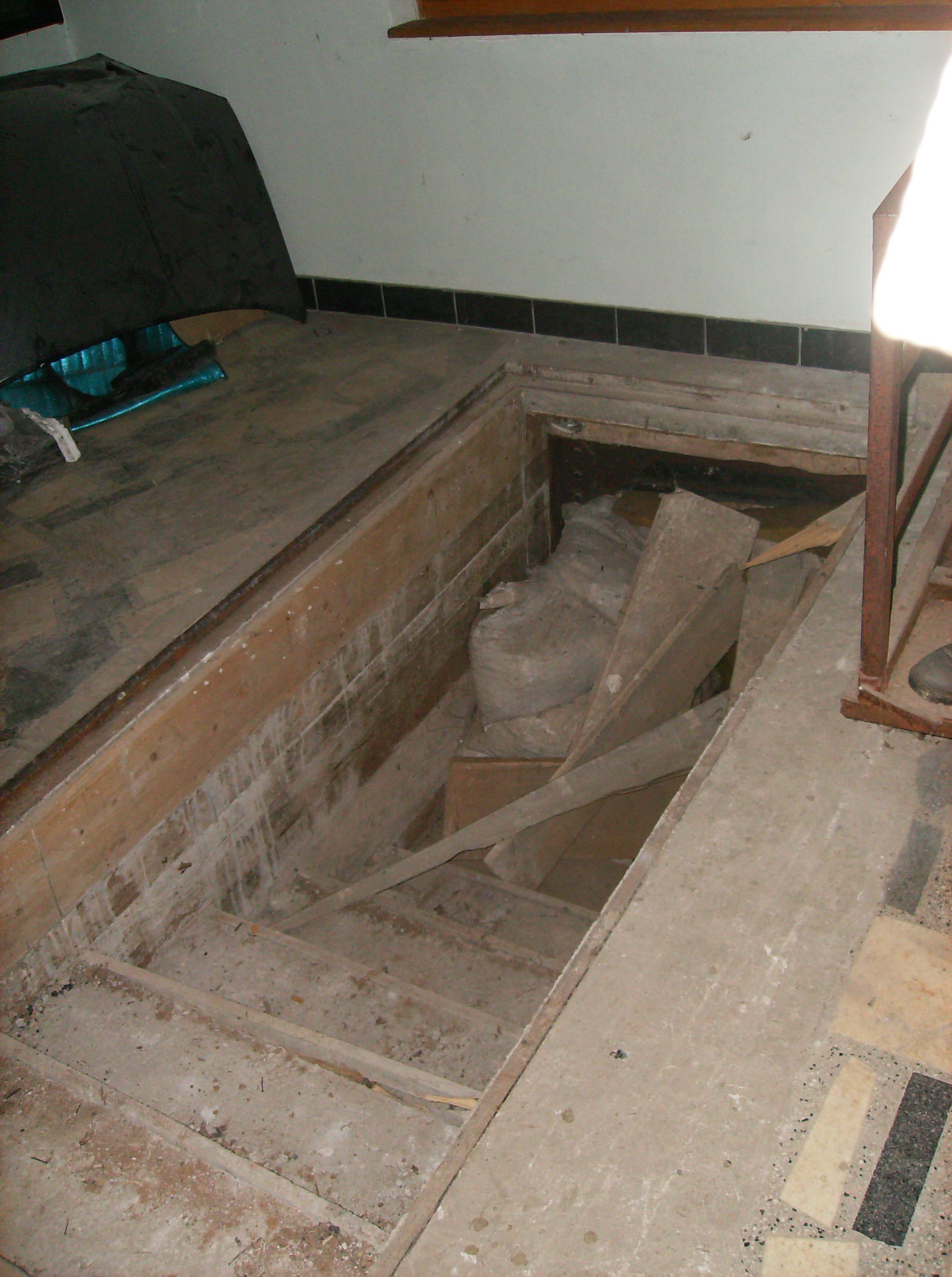
The tunnel's north entrance, within the territory under siege

Construction of the tunnel began in secret on 1 March 1993 under the codename "Objekt BD". The tunnel was to link Butmir and Dobrinja, two Bosnia-held neighborhoods; one inside Serbian siege lines and the other outside. Nedžad Branković, a Bosnian civil engineer, created the plans for the tunnel's construction underneath the Sarajevo airport runway. However, because of the urgency of the construction, full costing and technical specifications were never made.

The construction was assigned to the First Corps Army of Bosnia and Herzegovina under the supervision of deputy commander General Rašid Zorlak. Beginning the project was difficult as there was a lack of skilled manpower, tools, and materials to complete the task. Consequently, the tunnel was dug by hand, with shovels and picks, and wheelbarrows were used to carry 1,200 cubic metres (42,000 cu ft) of detritus away. The tunnel was dug 24-hours a day, with workers working in 8-hour shifts digging from opposite ends. Its construction was financed by the State, the Army, and the City of Sarajevo. The workers were paid with one packet of cigarettes per day, an item that was in high demand and a prized bartering possession.

One source states that a total of 2,800 cubic metres (99,000 cu ft) of soil was removed and 170 cubic metres (6,000 cu ft) of wood and 45 tonnes (50 tons) of steel were used in the construction of the tunnel. The biggest technical problem was the underground water, which had to be frequently thrown out manually. Because of the permanent shelling, the tunnel was installed with a pipeline that was used for the delivery of oil for the town. Communication lines and electric cables donated by Germany were also installed so that Sarajevo had electricity and telephone lines connecting it with the world.

The construction of the tunnel was completed on 30 June 1993, when the two tunnels met in the middle. Use of the tunnel began the following day on 1 July 1993.

== Structure ==
The tunnel consists of 160 metres (520 ft) of covered trenches on the Dobrinja side, 340 metres (1,100 ft) of covered trenches on the Butmir side, and 340 metres (1,100 ft) of actual tunnel under the airport runway. On the Dobrinja side, the average height of the tunnel is 1.6 metres (5 ft 3 in) (excluding the height of the iron reinforcements) and averages 0.8 metres (2 ft 7 in) in width for the top half and 1 metre (3 ft 3 in) in width for the bottom half of the tunnel. On the Butmir side, the tunnel is slightly higher; 1.8 metres (5 ft 11 in) excluding the wood reinforcements. The width on the Butmir side is the same as that of the Dobrinja side. There is also a section called the 'reduced level entrance', a 30-metre (100 ft) portion on the Dobrinja side that was the deepest and most difficult stretch of the tunnel to construct. At its deepest point, the tunnel is 5 metres (20 ft) below the airport runway.

The entrance on the Dobrinja side was the garage of an apartment building. The entrance on the Butmir side was a nondescript house near the airport belonging to the Kolar family. Both entrances were under close guard and ringed by trenches manned by Bosnian troops.

At first the tunnel was a simple, muddy path through which supplies had to be carried by hand or on the backs of soldiers. Less than a year after it was created, however, a small railway track was laid and small carts were built to transport supplies through the tunnel. The final construction of the tunnel included a 12-megawatt power cable, pumps for pumping underground water, an oil pipe and permanent lighting.

There were two major problems with the tunnel. The first was flooding by underground waters which could rise to levels waist deep. The second was air quality. The tunnel had no ventilation and consequently everyone entering the tunnel was forced to wear a mask.

== Usage ==
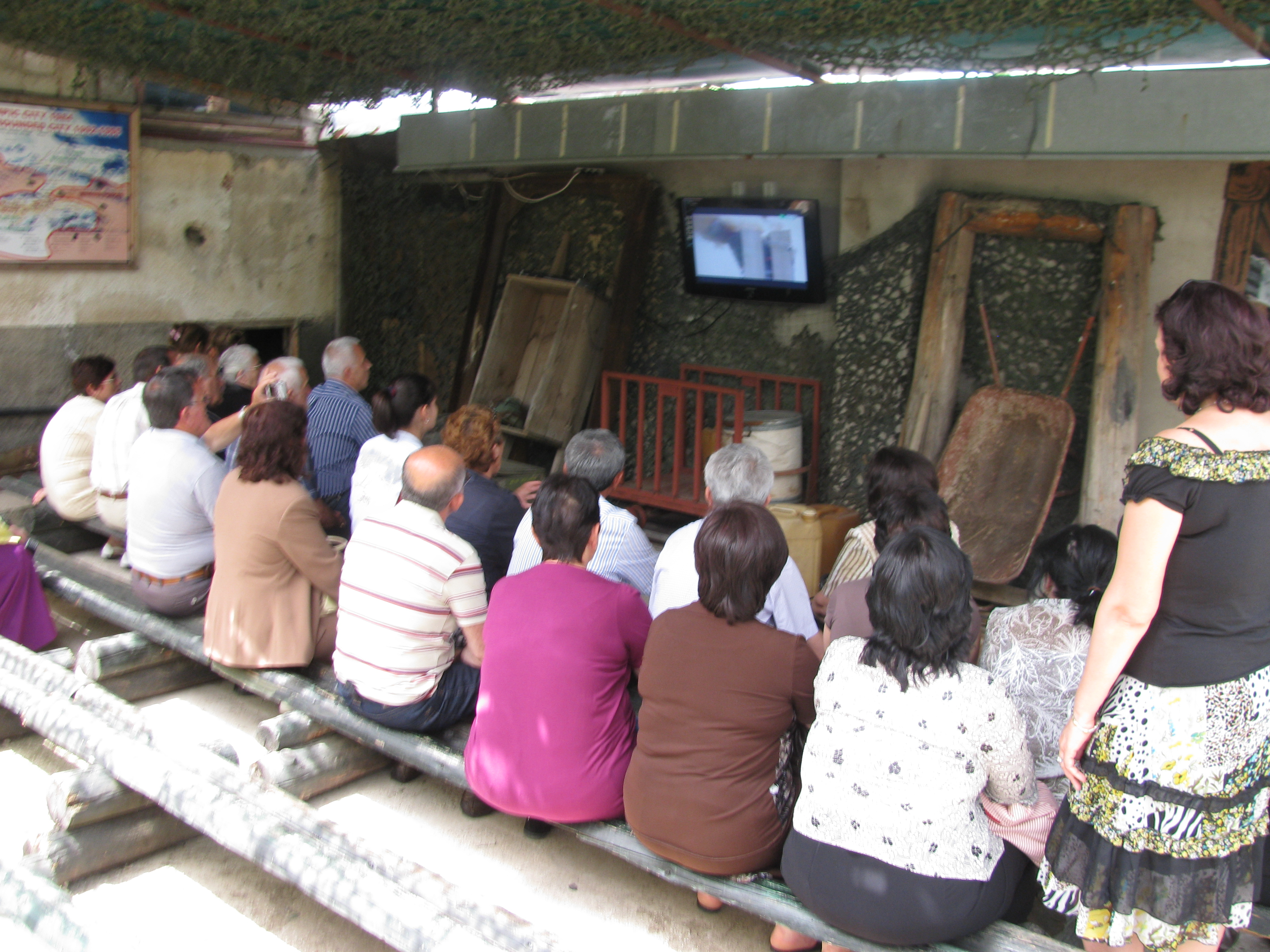
Educational video screening at Sarajevo Tunnel Museum

The tunnel was constructed during the Bosnian War as a means by which to link two Bosnian held territories that had been cut off by the Army of Republika Srpska. The tunnel provided a crude way to supply Bosnian units and civilians in Sarajevo. It also allowed for communication between the Bosnian and Bosnian-allied forces in Sarajevo and outside territories. It became a symbol of the city's struggle. It allowed humanitarian aid to be given to the Bosnians and it let them flee the city.

The tunnel was used to supply the Bosnian armed forces with wartime supplies, including food, fuel, newspapers, and weapons. Wagons were used to cart supplies through the tunnel and could be loaded with 400 kilograms (880 lb) of goods at a time. The first items to go through the tunnel were Bosnian IEDs. Food, cigarettes, alcohol, and petrol also passed through the tunnel allowing Butmir, Kolonija, and Hrasnica to become blackmarket centers for the illegal sale of these items. The tunnel was also used to transport oil, and for telecommunication.

The tunnel was also used as a way for Bosnians to get out of Sarajevo. Transit each way, both into the city and out of the city, was constant. Every day, between 3000 and 4,000 Bosnian soldiers (as well as civilians) and 30 tonnes (33 tons) of various goods passed through the tunnel. Groups traveling through the tunnel ranged in size from 20 to 1,000 people. On average, it took 2 hours for these groups to travel through the tunnel. Throughout the war, between two million and three million trips of Bosnians were made through the tunnel, and a number of Bosnian civilians used the tunnel to flee Sarajevo. Those who traveled through the tunnel included soldiers, civilians, politicians, and generals. Alija Izetbegović, President of the Republic of Bosnia and Herzegovina, is the most notable individual who used the tunnel. He was carried through the tunnel on a chair called the "President's Chair" and thus never actually laid foot in the tunnel.

The entrance to the tunnel was protected by the Bosnian army, and a permit was required to enter and leave the city by this underground route. There were reports of Bosnian civilians being forced to pay up to $120 USD to the Bosnian army for passage for them and their families through the tunnel.

== Sarajevo Tunnel Museum ==
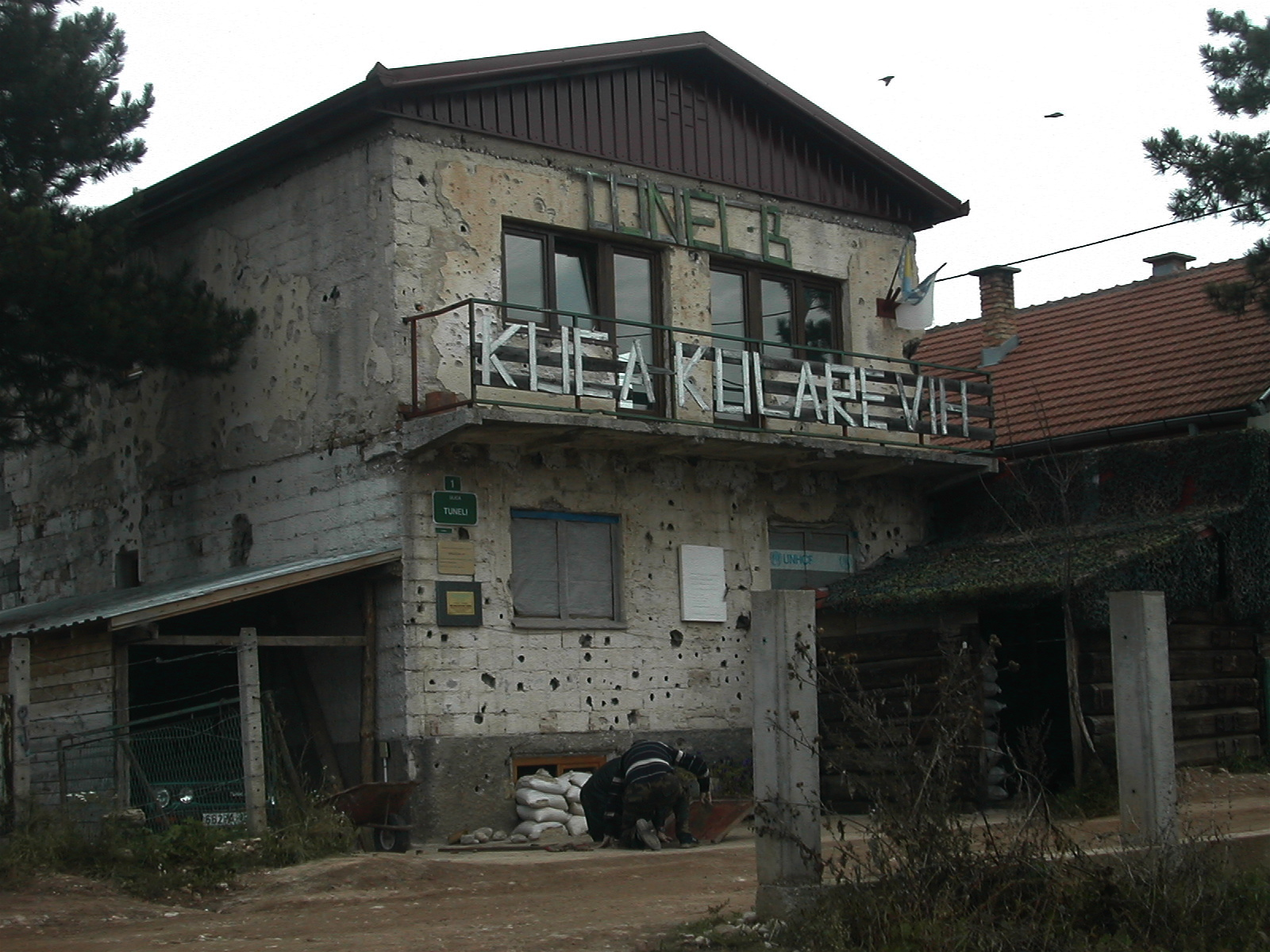
The house in which the tunnel's southern entrance was hidden is now a museum

After the war, the Sarajevo Tunnel Museum was built onto the historic private house whose cellar served as the entrance to the Sarajevo Tunnel. Visitors can still walk down a small length of the tunnel (approximately 20 metres; 70 ft). The house museum exhibits archival materials including an 18-minute-long film, war photographs, military equipment, flags, military uniforms, along with flotsam and jetsam. In 2004, local planning authorities were seeking funding for a "full reconstruction of the tunnel" and the "construction of museum buildings at its entrance and exit points".

Regarding the museum's purpose Vladimir Zubić, deputy of the City Council of Sarajevo, noted that the museum is "a reminder of everyone, so that a thing like this tunnel, that provided the people of this city with the minimum subsistence, will never have to be used again. It will be a place where younger people will be able to study a part of our recent past and it will be proof that this part of our history will never be forgotten".

The house and the land around Sarajevo Tunnel's entrance are owned by Bajro Kolar, a local man who runs the private museum. In a documentary about the Sarajevo War Tunnel, he talked about his reasons for turning the house into a war facility. He said, "whatever we have, we gave for the defense and liberation of Sarajevo." Having existed for 15 years without any governmental financial support, the museum is becoming one of the most visited sites of the Bosnian capital, with hundreds of daily visitors. Many guided tours in Sarajevo include the Tunnel Museum as one of the war sites most worth visiting in the city.

The museum is open to visitors every working day from 09:00 to 18:00.

== Gallery ==
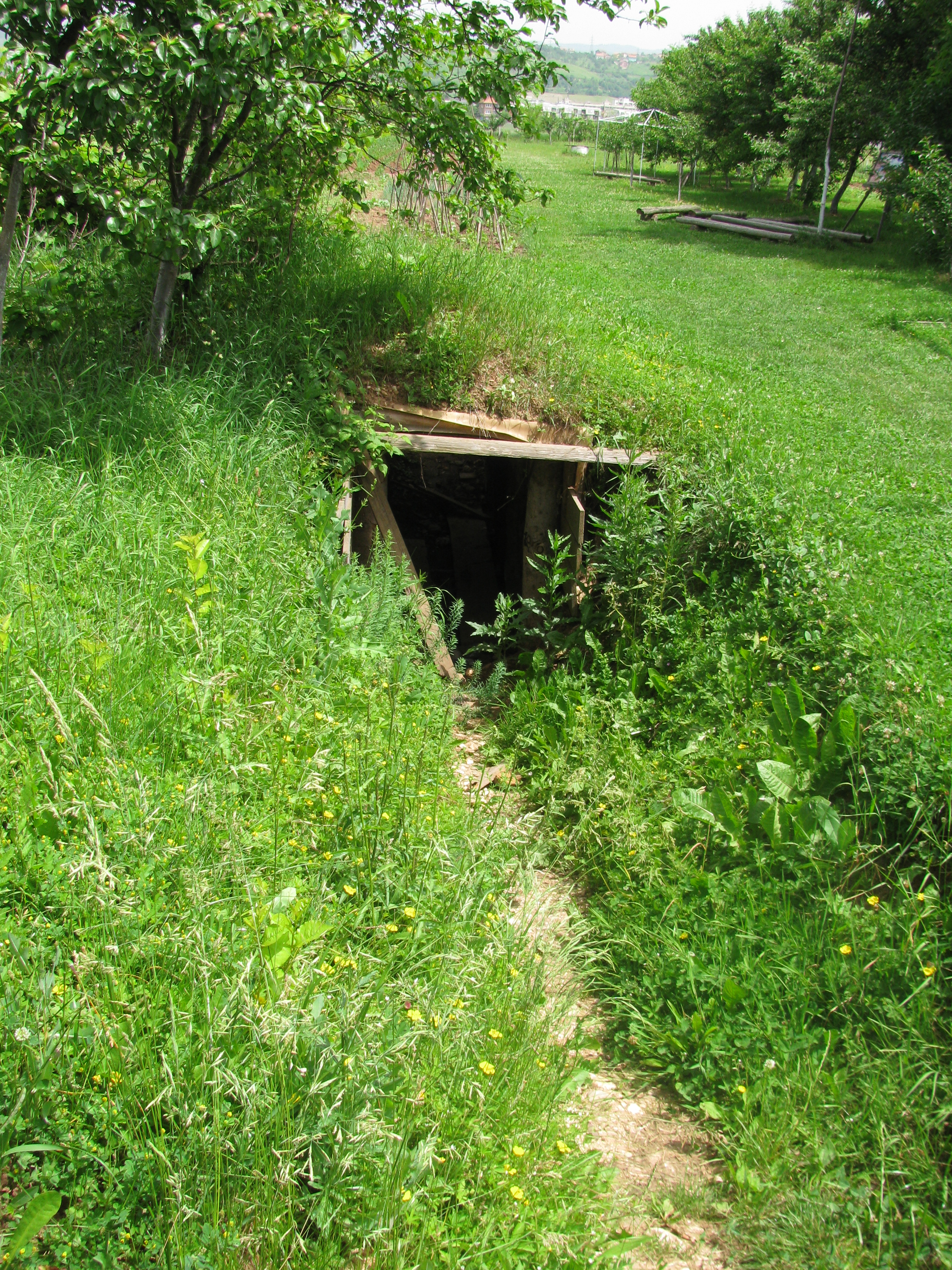
Sarajevo Tunnel south

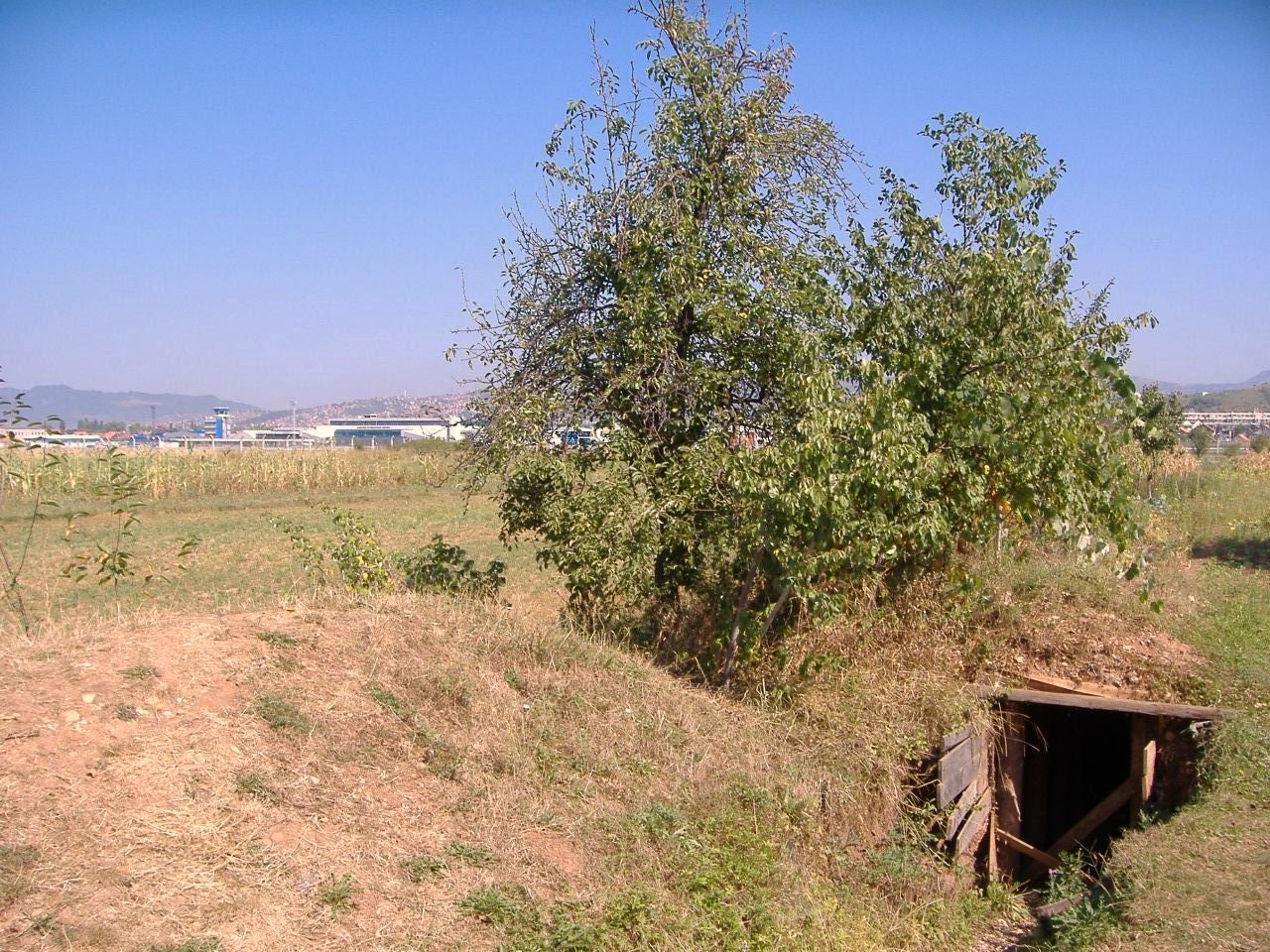
Sarajevo Tunnel south

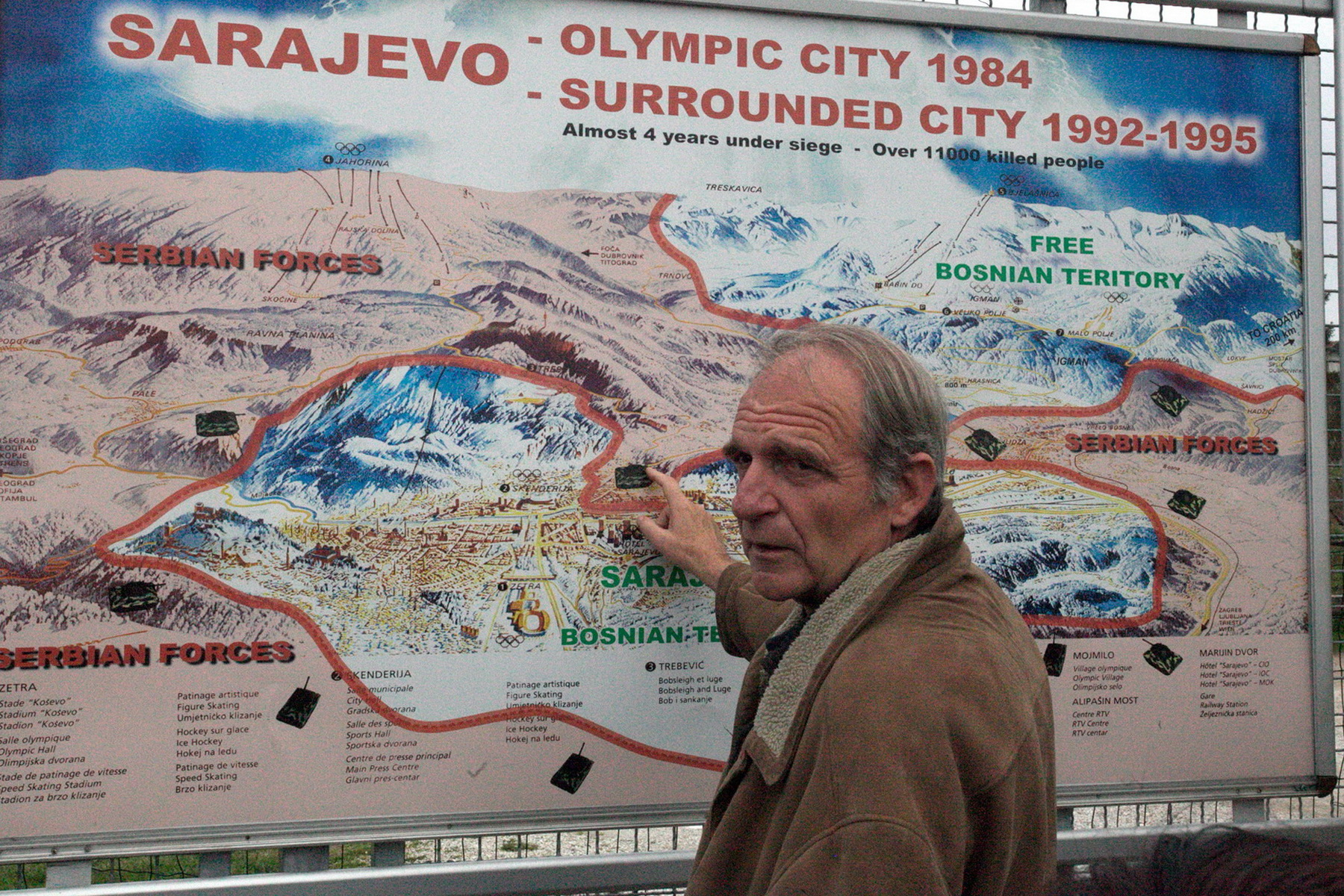
Surrounded Sarajevo

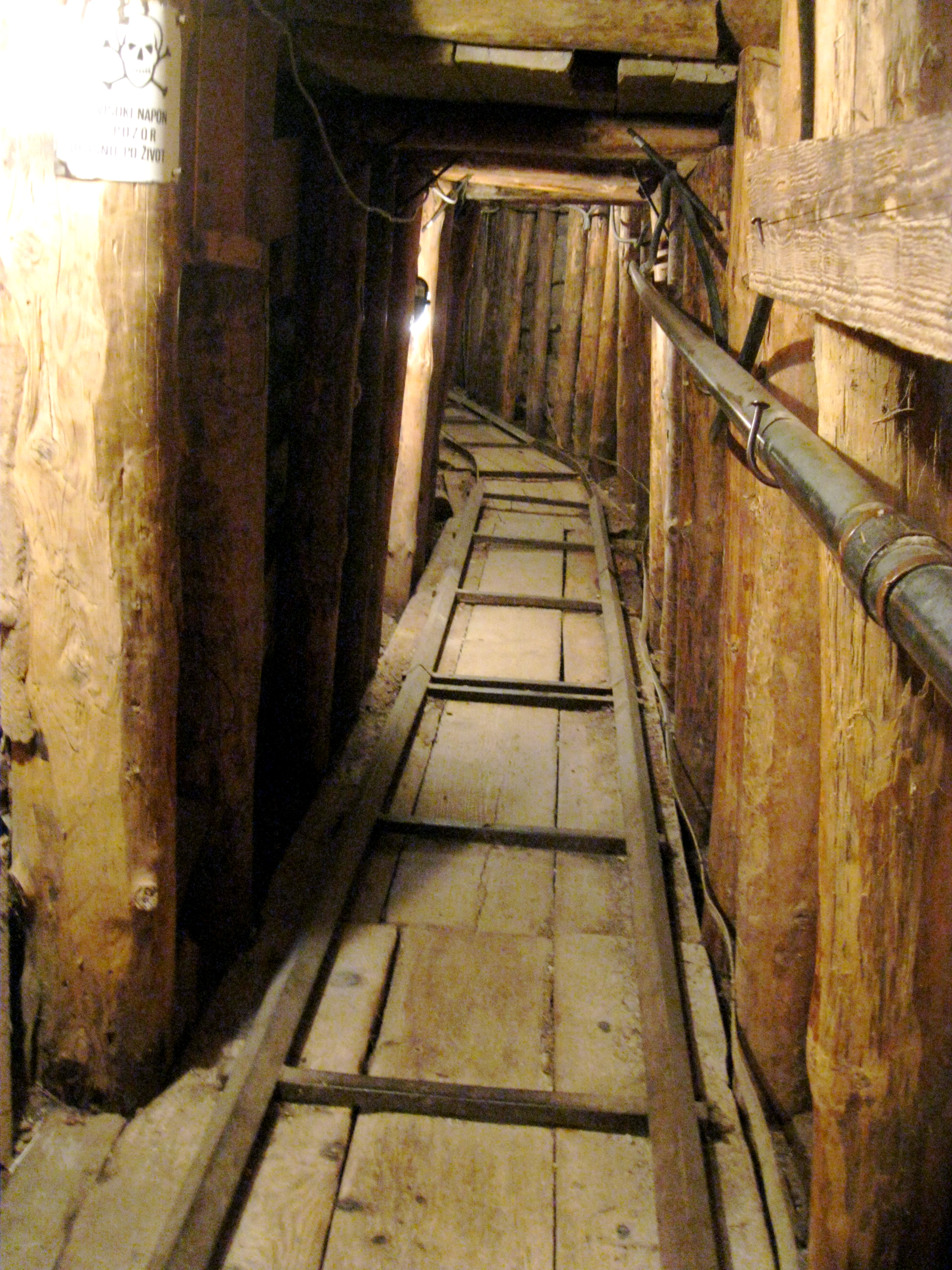
Sarajevo Tunnel

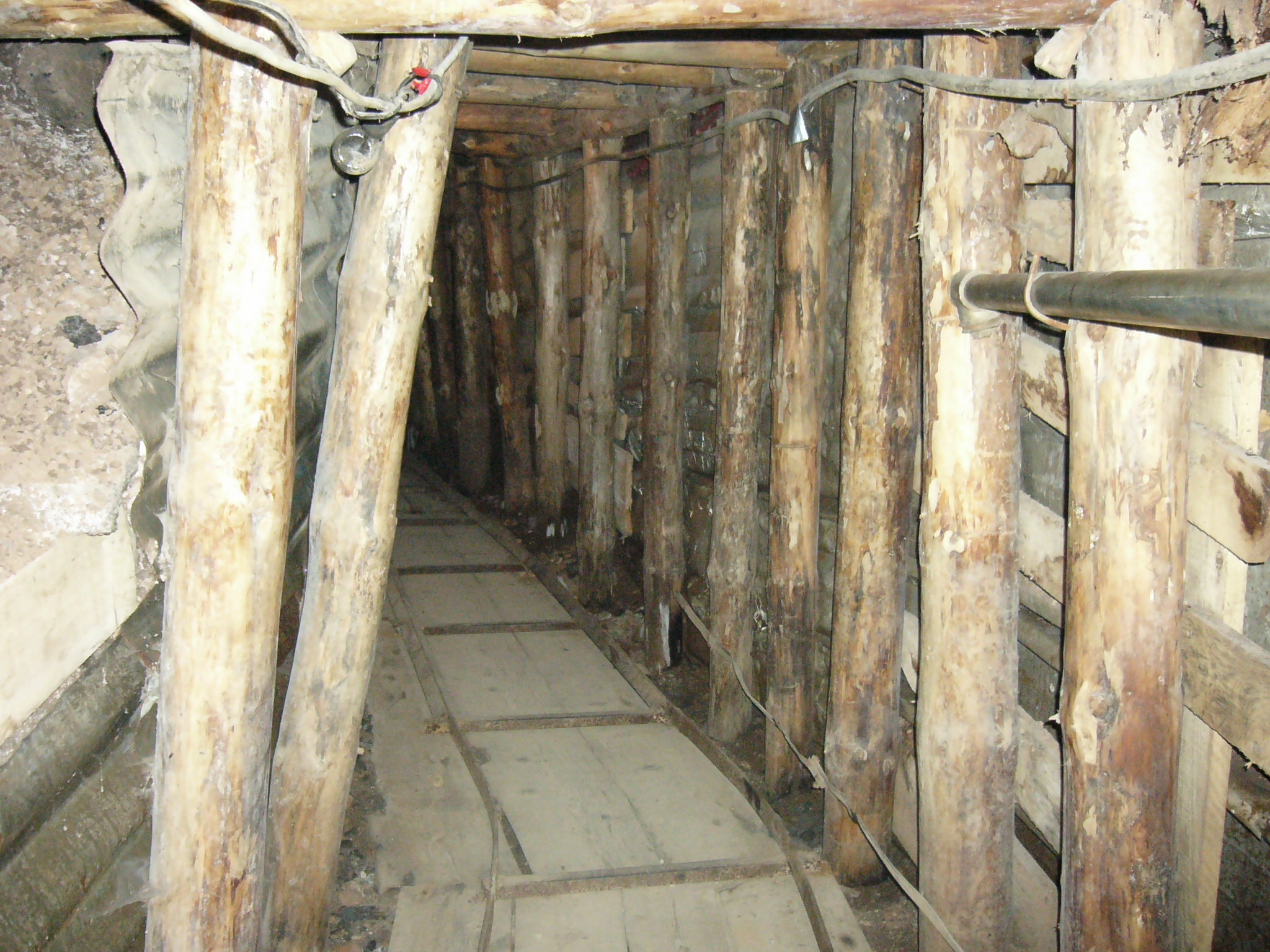
Sarajevo Tunnel

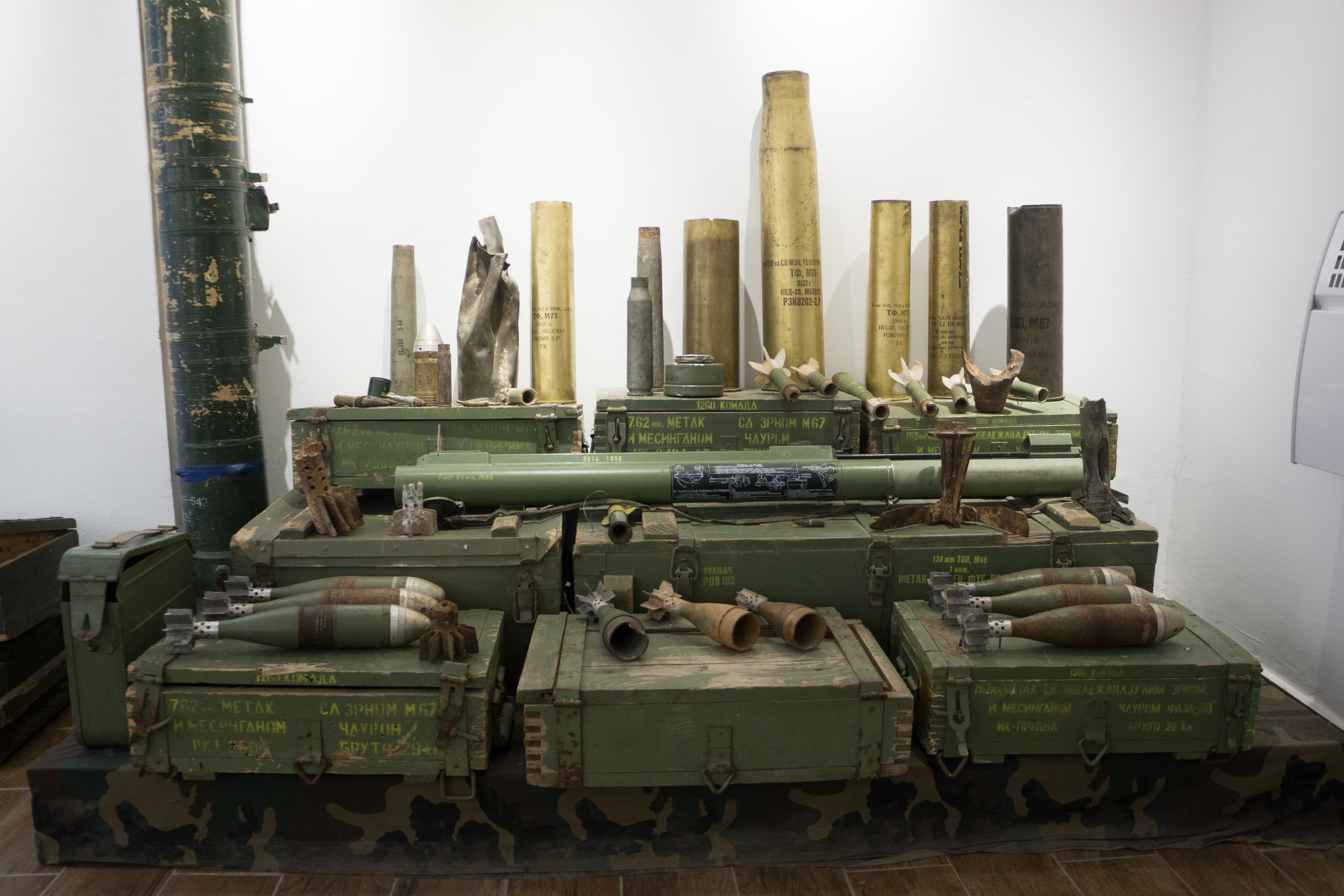
Weapons used during Siege on Sarajevo

== Bibliography ==
- Donia, Robert J. (2006). Sarajevo: A Biography. Ann Arbor: University of Michigan Press.
