= Krajina =

Slavic toponym meaning frontier or march

Krajina (Serbo-Croatian: [krâjina]) is a Slavic toponym, meaning 'country' or 'march'. The term is related to kraj or krai, originally meaning 'land, country; edge' and today denoting a region or province, usually remote from urban centers.

== Etymology ==
The Serbo-Croatian word krajina derives from Proto-Slavic *krajina, derived from *krajь, related to *krojiti 'to cut'; the original meaning of krajina thus seems to have been 'place at an edge, fringe, borderland', as reflected in the meanings of Church Slavonic краина, kraina.

In Old East Slavic: Ѹкраина/Ꙋкраина, romanized: Oukraina [uˈkrɑjinɑ]) appears in the Hypatian Codex of c. 1425 under the year 1187 in reference to a part of the territory of Kievan Rus', meaning specifically region or land itself rather than borderland.

In most Slavic languages (including the Chakavian and Kajkavian dialects of Serbo-Croatian), the root krajina is found and means country: in Polish (kraj), Slovak (krajina), Czech, Ukrainian (країна, romanised krayina), Belarusian (краіна, romanised kraina) and Sorbian. Though, in Slovenian, this word means land and march. To these languages, the word krajina was derived from Proto-Slavic *krajь, just like in Serbo-Croatian.

The name of Ukraine derives from Old East Slavic украина (ukraina) 'boundary, outskirts, borderland', a compound of оу (u) 'beside, at' + краи (krai) 'land, edge' + -ина (-ina), a suffix creating a feminine noun. The Proto-Slavic word *krajь generally meant "edge", related to the verb *krojiti 'to cut (out)', in the sense of 'division', either 'at the edge, division line' or 'a division, region'. In modern Slavic languages, variations of kraj or krai mean a wide array of things, such as 'edge, country, land, end, region, bank, shore, side, rim, piece (of wood), area'.

In some South Slavic languages, including Serbo-Croatian and Slovene, the word krajina or its cognate still refers primarily to a border, fringe, or borderland of a country (sometimes with an established military defense), and secondarily to a region, area, or landscape. Krajina is also a surname, mostly among South Slavic language speakers. The word kraj can today mean 'end, extremity, region, land, area'.

== Geographical regions ==
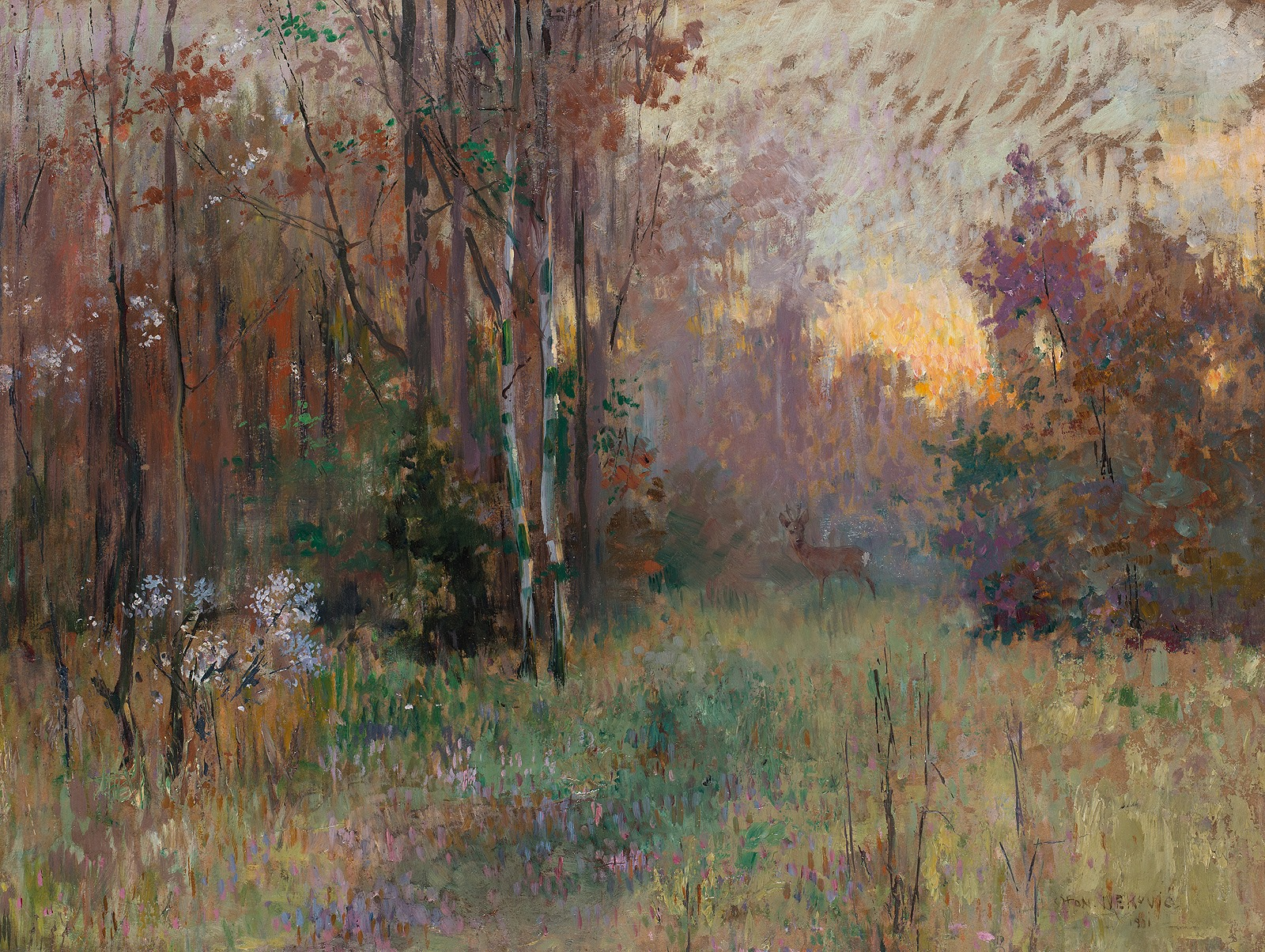
Krajina, oil painting by Croatian artist Oton Iveković (1901)

=== Bosnia and Herzegovina ===
- Bosanska Krajina sits in a triangle roughly between Banja Luka, Prijedor and Bihać, and encompasses a larger area westwards from the Vrbas river to Una and toward the Sava on the north; while on the south it is bordered by the Unac. In medieval Bosnia the region was known as Donji Kraji.
- Cazinska Krajina is the borderland of Bosnia adjacent to Croatia around the city of Cazin. Today it constitutes Una-Sana Canton.

=== Bosnia-Herzegovina and Croatia ===
- Krajina, medieval name for the region(s) in Central Dalmatia in Croatia, including parts of Lower Neretva and western Herzegovina in today's Bosnia and Herzegovina. It extended in the east-west direction from the lower course of the river Neretva in the east to the river Cetina in the west, and in the south-north direction from the rivers Vrljika and Trebižat and the mountains Dinara, Mosor and Biokovo in the north to the Adriatic Sea.
  - Neretvanska krajina, historical area west of the river Neretva and southwest of Imotski; including a part of the peri-littoral area near Makarska in Croatia is called Krajina;
  - Omiška krajina, region in the hinterland of Omiš, in Zagora in southern Croatia, west of Cetinska krajina;
  - Vrgoračka krajina, area in Zagora, in southern Croatia, around the city of Vrgorac, southwest of Herzegovina and west of the Neretva valley, east of Imotska krajina;
  - Vrlička krajina, area in Zagora, in southern Croatia, around the city of Vrlika, west of Livanjski kraj, northwest of Cetinska krajina (sometimes considered as part of Cetinska krajina);
  - Imotska krajina, area around the city of Imotski, in Zagora in southern Croatia, constituted mostly by Imotsko polje;
  - Cetinska krajina, area along the valley of the river Cetina in southern Croatia, in Zagora, west of the border with Herzegovina, constituted mostly by Sinjsko polje.

=== Croatia ===
- kъrainu (Krajina), medieval Glagolitic name of a Croatian province on the Baška tablet (c. 1100).
- municipality of Krajina, a former municipality located between Split and Imotski in southern Croatia, existed from 1912–1945;
- also the name of the soccer club from Imotski.
- Republic of Serbian Krajina, Serbian proto-state which existed from 1991 to 1995
- Drniška krajina, area around the city of Drniš, in Zagora in southern Croatia.
- Istarska krajina, historical region in western Croatia, central area of Istria.
- Kninska Krajina, region around Knin in southern Croatia, north of Drniška krajina and northeast of Cetinska krajina.
- Sinjska krajina, area in Zagora in southern Croatia around the city of Sinj, west of Livanjski kraj, southeast of Vrlička krajina (sometimes considered as part of Cetinska krajina).

=== Montenegro ===
- Skadarska Krajina, region north of Bar and Ulcinj, across the mountain. It borders Skadar Lake on its northern edge.

=== Poland ===
- Krajna, historical region on the border between Greater Poland and Pomerania.

=== Serbia ===
- Timok Valley (Serbian: Тимочка Крајина, romanized: Timočka Krajina), border region of Serbia adjacent to Bulgaria, around the Timok River.
  - Negotin Valley (Serbian: Неготинска Крајина, romanized: Negotinska Krajina), a part of the Timok Valley around the city of Negotin.
- Koča's krajina, an area liberated during the eighth Austrian-Turkish war.

=== Slovenia ===
- White Carniola (Slovene: Bela krajina), borderland of Slovenia adjacent to Croatia.

== Political regions ==
Subdivisions of Austria-Hungary:

- Military Frontier (Serbo-Croatian: Vojna krajina, German: Militärgrenze), borderland of Austrian Empire against the Ottoman Empire. It was further divided into:
  - Banat Krajina (on the Serbian-Romanian border);
  - Croatian Krajina (on the border of western Croatia and Bosnia);
  - Slavonian Krajina (on the border of Serbia and eastern Croatia with Bosnia).

Political units formed by rebel Serbs at the beginning of the Croatian War of Independence (1991–95):

- Republic of Serbian Krajina (1991–95)
- SAO Krajina
- SAO Kninska Krajina, used by some since the Yugoslav Wars to signify two regions, Knin and its surroundings, and to a larger extent Krajina proper (the main portion of the Republic of Serb Krajina).
- SAO Eastern Slavonia, Baranja and Western Syrmia, sometimes called Podunavska Krajina

Political unit formed by Serbs in the prelude (1991) to the Bosnian War (1992–95):

- SAO Bosanska Krajina

Where the term Serbian Krajina or Krajina alone is used, it most often refers to the former Republic of Serbian Krajina.

In Russia:

- In Russian, kray (край) is the word for the territories of Russia, a second-level subdivision.

In Slovakia:

- In Slovak, kraj is used for the regions of Slovakia, a first-level subdivision.

In the Czech Republic:

- In Czech, kraj is used for the regions of the Czech Republic, a first-level subdivision.

In Ukraine:

- In Ukrainian, krajina (країна) means 'country, land', while Ukrajina is the country's name. See also: Name of Ukraine.

== People ==
- Krajina Belojević, a 9th-century Serbian duke in the Principality of Serbia

== See also ==
- Krain
- Kraj
- Ukraine
- Semasiological map for *krajь

== Bibliography ==
- Derksen, Rick (2008). Etymological Dictionary of the Slavic Inherited Lexicon (PDF). Leiden Indo-European Etymological Dictionary Series. Leiden; Boston: Brill. p. 737. ISBN 978-90-04-15504-6. OCLC 179104910. Archived from the original on 31 October 2013.
- Karlo Jurišić, Lepantska pobjeda i makarska Krajina, Adriatica maritima, sv. I, (Lepantska bitka, Udio hrvatskih pomoraca u Lepantskoj bitki 1571. godine), Institut JAZU u Zadru, Zadar, 1974., str. 217., 222., (reference from Morsko prase)
- Pivtorak, Hryhoriy Petrovych (2001). Походження українців, росіян, білорусів та їхніх мов Pochodžennja ukrajinciv, rosijan, bilorusiv ta jichnich mov [The Origin of Ukrainians, Belarusians, Russians and their languages] (in Ukrainian). Kyiv: Akademia. ISBN 966-580-082-5.
