= Struge =

Struge may refer to:

- Struge, Bosnia and Herzegovina, a town in Čapljina municipality, Bosnia and Herzegovina
- Struga (Macedonian: Струга, Albanian: Strugë), a town in the Republic of Macedonia
- Pri Cerkvi–Struge, a village in the Municipality of Dobrepolje in Slovenia.
