= Kravica (waterfall) =

- Кравица
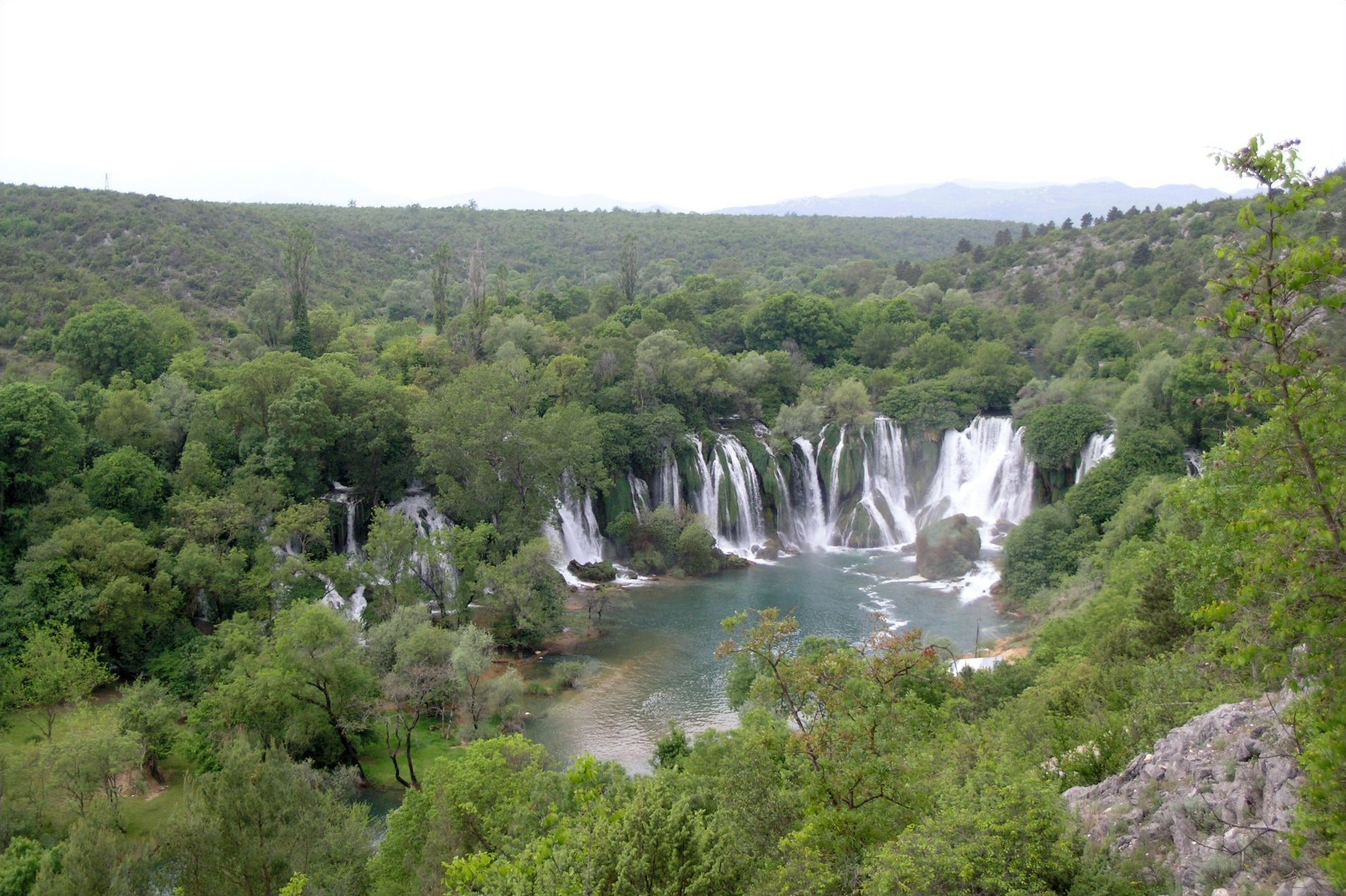
- A view of the Kravica falls

- Location within Bosnia and Herzegovina
- Location: Bosnia and Herzegovina
- Coordinates: 43.154121°N 17.603672°E
- Type: Segmented
- Total height: 25 metres (80 ft)
- Number of drops: 1
- Total width: 120 metres (390 ft)
- Watercourse: River Trebižat

Kravica Waterfall (Serbo-Croatian: Slap Kravica or Vodopad Kravica / Слап Кравица or Водопад Кравица) is a large tufa cascade on the Trebižat River, in the karstic heartland of Herzegovina in Bosnia and Herzegovina. It is 10 kilometres (6 mi) south of Ljubuški and 40 kilometres (25 mi) south of Mostar. Its height is about 25 metres (80 ft) and the radius of the lake in the base of the waterfall is 120 metres (390 ft). Kravica is a popular swimming and picnic area and, during the summer, it is frequently visited by tourists from around the world.

The Kravica Falls area also has a little cafe, a rope swing, a picnic area, and a place to camp. The best time of year for visiting is during the springtime when the fall is at its fullest and the arid landscape turns a bright green. During the high season, various restaurants in the vicinity of the waterfalls mostly offer grilled dishes and fish specialties. Near the Kravica Falls is also a small grotto with stalactites made of calcium carbonate, an old mill and a sailing ship. The owner of the waterfall was a famous municipal councilor, landowner, benefactor and philanthropist from Ljubuški, Zaim-beg Selimić.

== Gallery ==
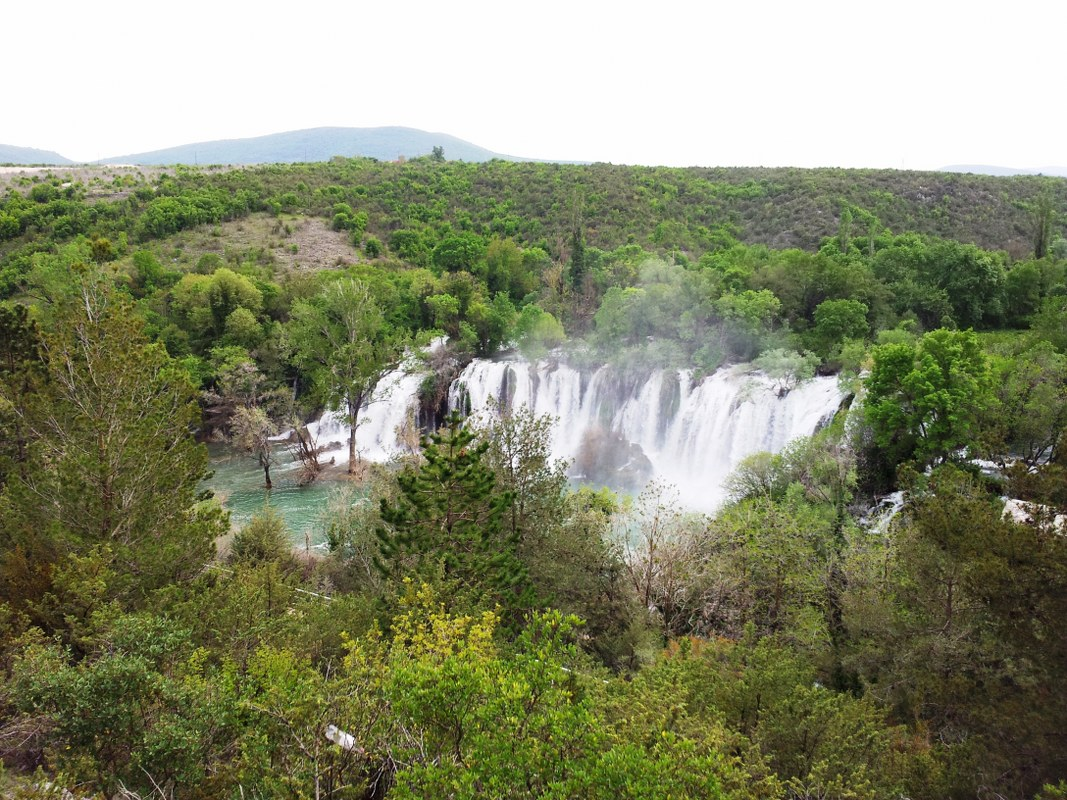
Kravica in winter and spring at high discharge

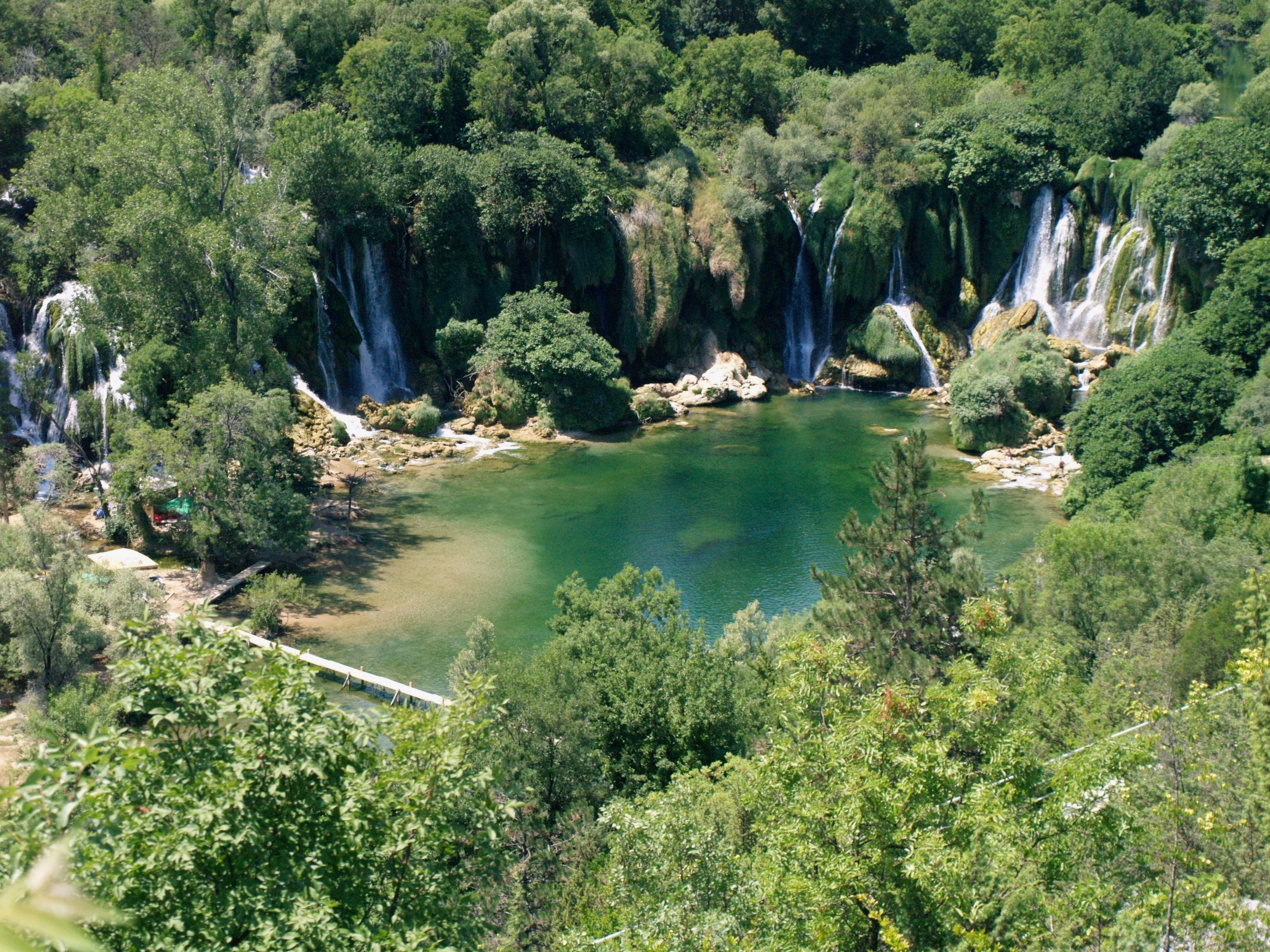
Kravica in summer at low discharge

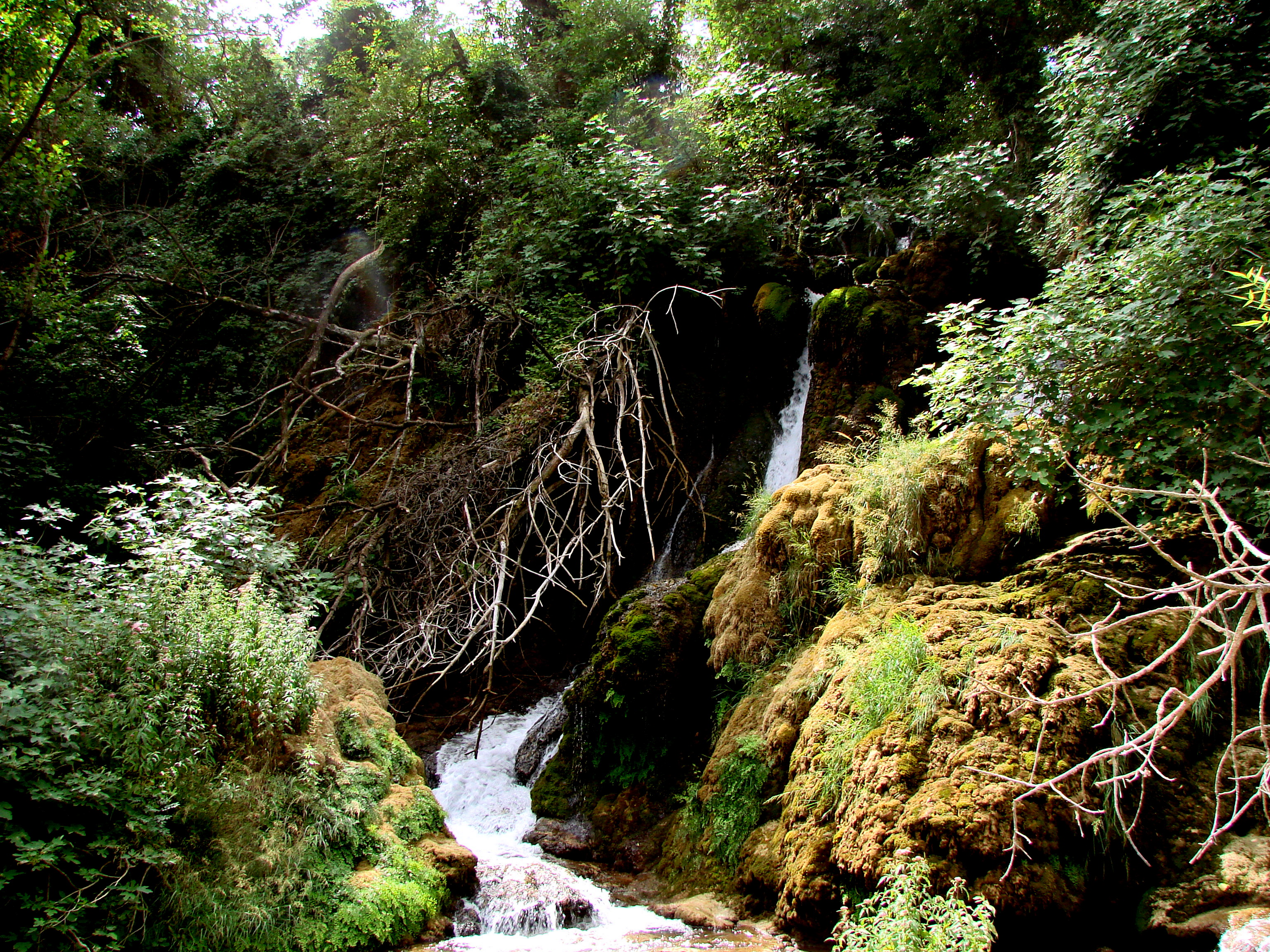
Kravica & its tufa beds at the waterfall barrier

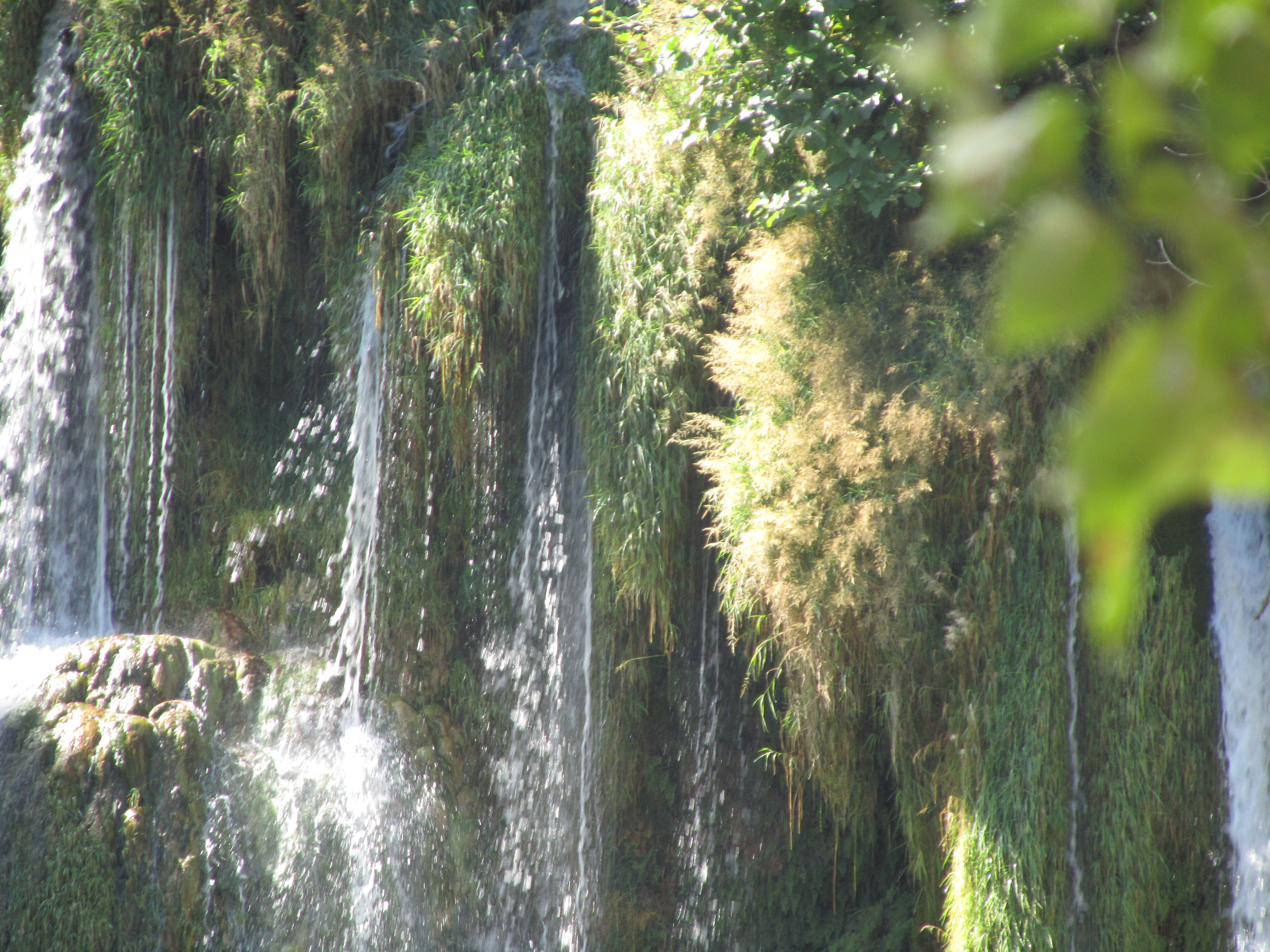
Kravica symbiosis - tufa overgrown with moss helps accumulate more tufa

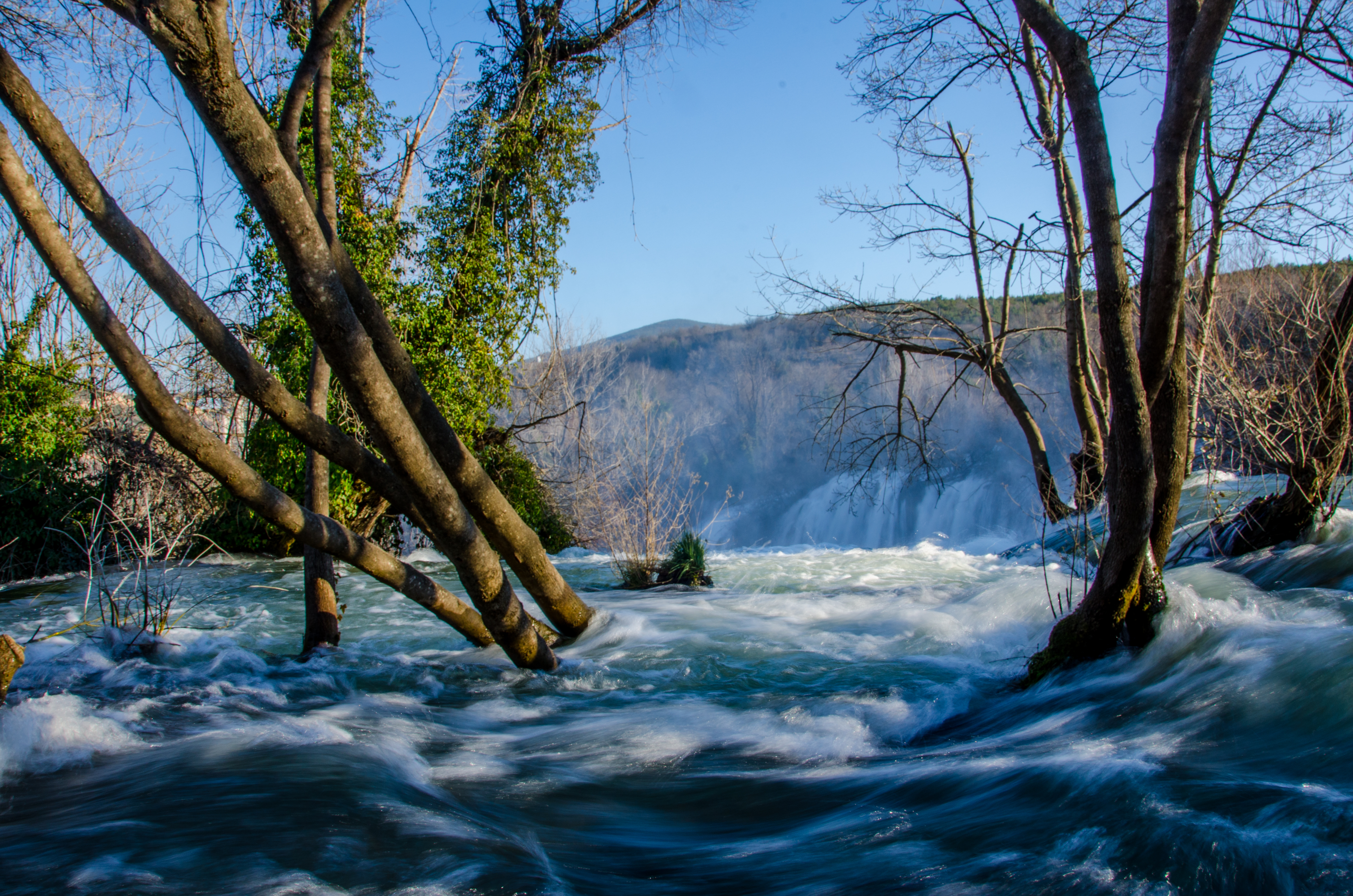
Kravica - at the falls crown

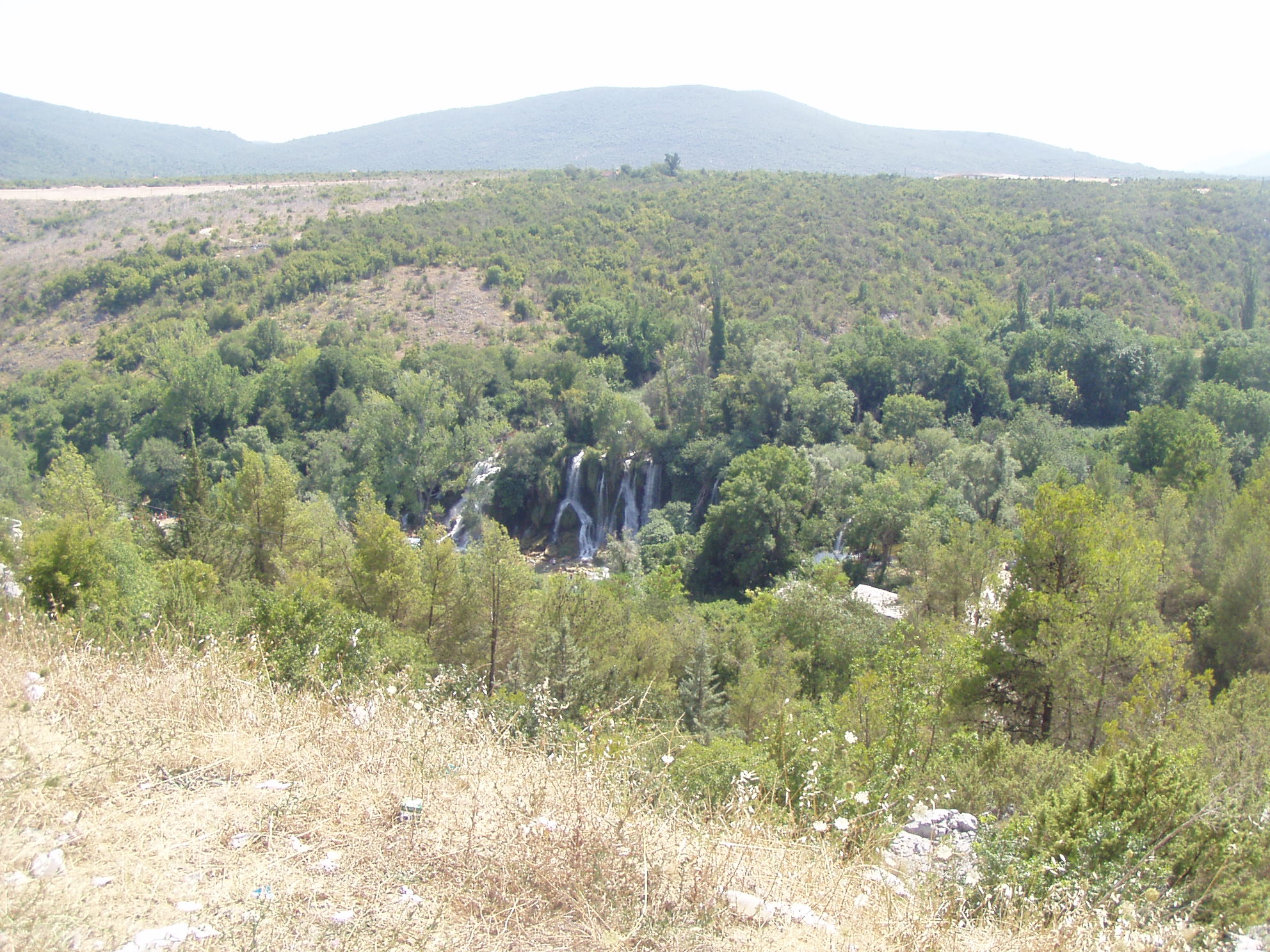
Kravica immediate surroundings under pressure - A1 highway visible in close proximity

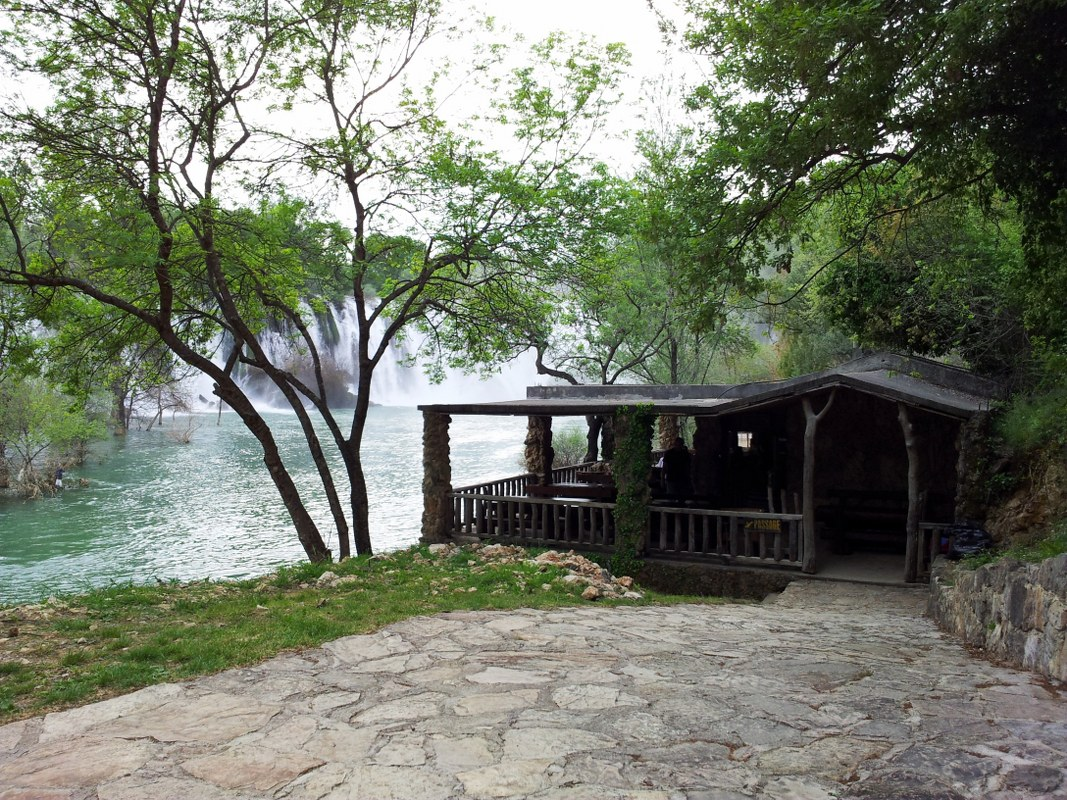
Kravica under anthropogenic pressure - tourist paved walk and nearby bar

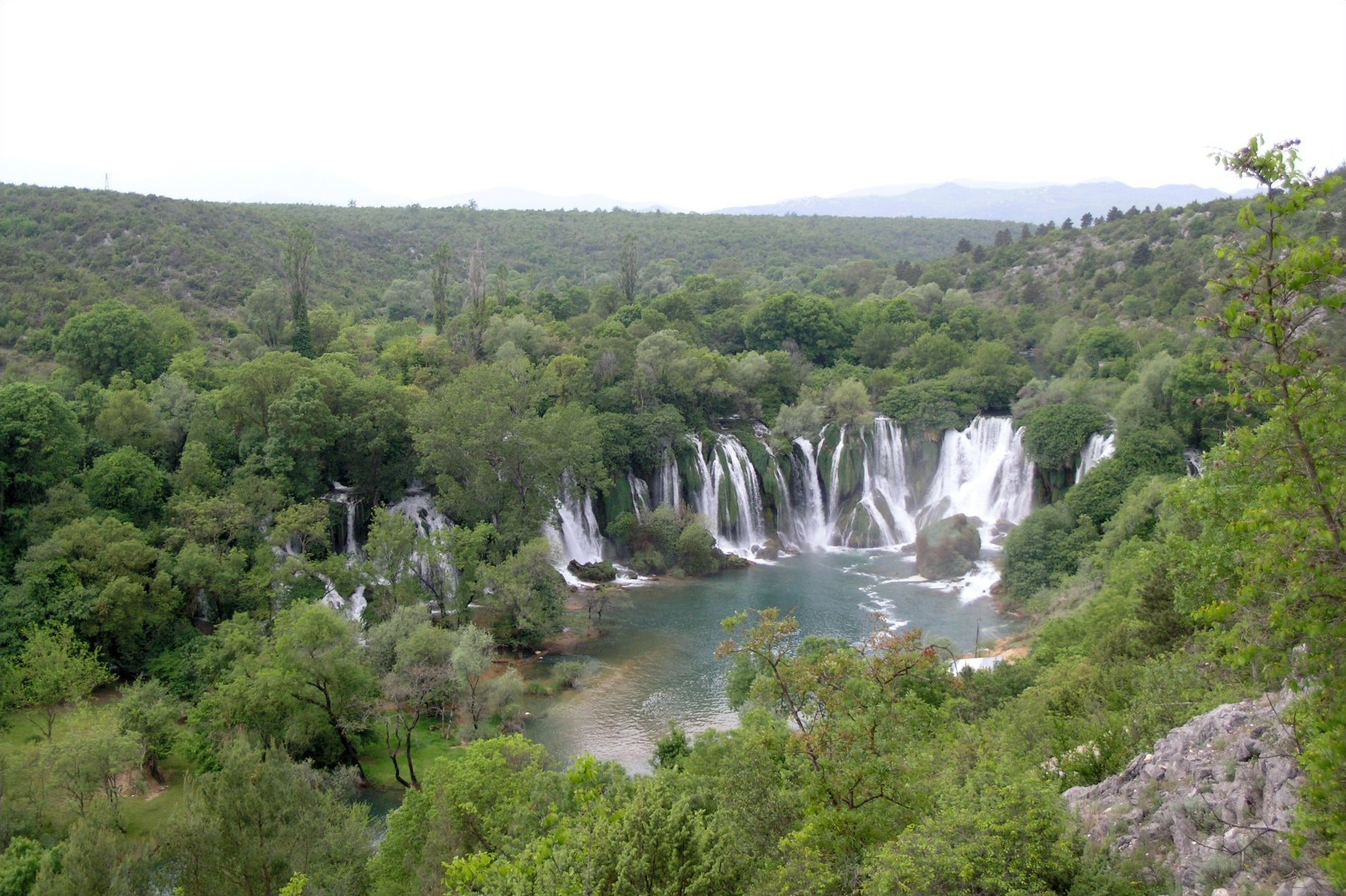
Kravica lush surrounding and rich riparian ecosystem

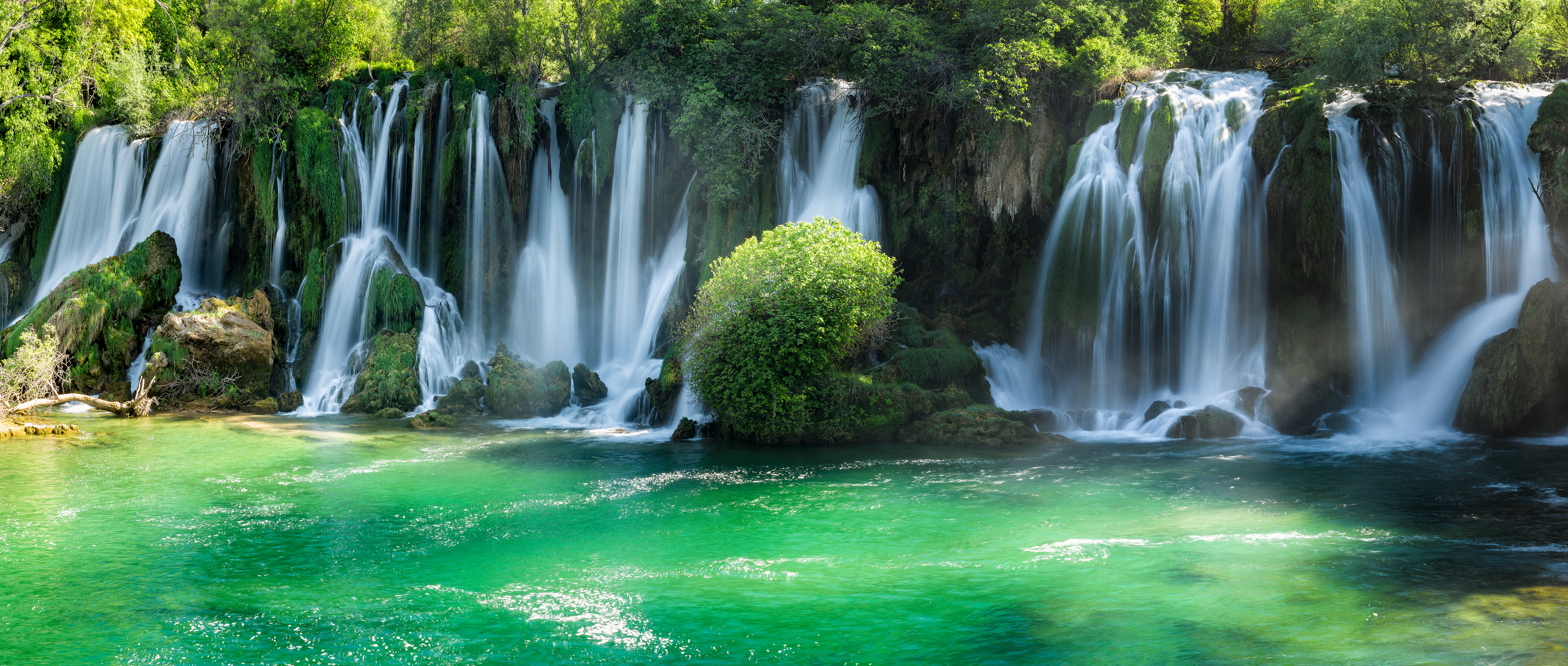
A scene when the sun broke through lighting up the Kravica Waterfalls

== See also ==
- List of waterfalls
- Koćuša
