= Trebižat (river) =

Trebižat Vrljika (at Imotski), Matica (at Drinovci), Suvaja (at Posušje), Tihaljina (at Peć Mlini), Mlade (at Mlade), Stari (Old) Prokop & (New) Prokop or Kanal (at Jegetina), Trebižat (till mouth), (also at various places) Culuša, Ričina, Rika, & Brina
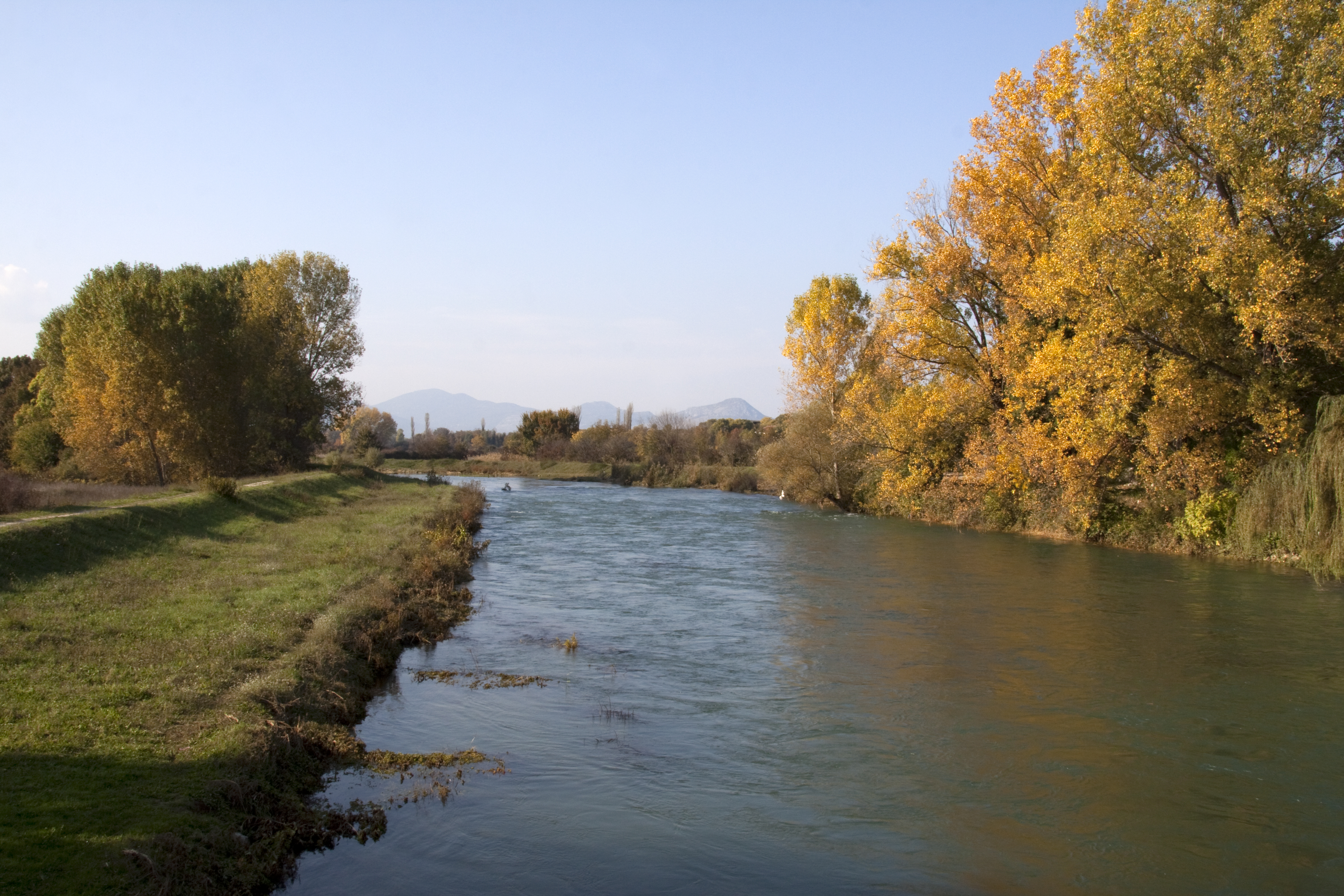
- The Trebižat River in Ljubuški

- Trebižat confluence with Neretva
- Native name: Rika (Serbo-Croatian)

Location
- Country: Bosnia and Herzegovina
- Cities: Ljubuški, Čapljina

Physical characteristics
- Source
  - location: Peć Mlini
  - coordinates: 43.336715°N 17.323457°E
- Mouth
  - location: Neretva at Struge near Čapljina
  - coordinates: 43.0899°N 17.7008°E
- Length: 51 km (32 mi)

Basin features
- Progression: Vrljika→ Matica→ Tihaljina→ Mlade→ Trebižat→ Neretva→ Adriatic Sea

The Trebižat (Serbian Cyrillic: Требижат) is a river in the southern part of Bosnia and Herzegovina, and major right tributary of the Neretva River.

== Geography and hydrology ==
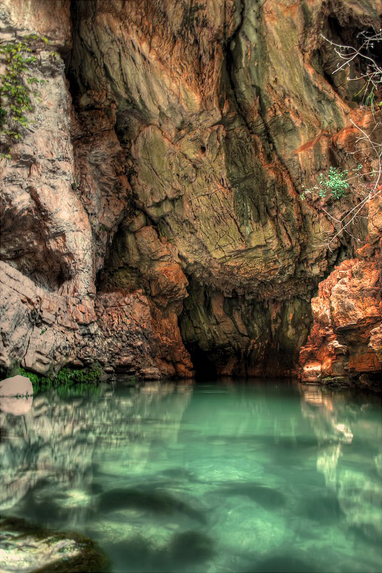
Source of the Trebižat/Tihaljina at Peć Mlini

Trebižat River is located in the south-western region of Bosnia and Herzegovina. It is part of the Neretva basin and it is a major tributary of the Neretva river. The river rises from the large karstic wellspring within cave in Peć Mlini village. This wellspring is continuation of the Vrljika (Matica) river which sunk few kilometers before and on a plain above, at the southeastern end of Imotsko Polje near Drinovci in Bosnia and Herzegovina.

=== Sinking river ===
Trebižat is 51 km long and is the second largest losing (sinking) stream in Bosnia and Herzegovina, whose waters drains into the underground and reappear several times at various locations, but as a river the Trebižat sinks only once as the Matica, in estavelle(s) at the southeastern edge of Imotsko Polje near Drinovci, and reappears again in Peć Mlini wellspring as the Tihaljina (later Trebižat), renamed afterwards nine more times. In terms of length, it comes right after the Trebišnjica river which is the largest river of this kind in the world and also a tributary of the Neretva watershed.

=== Nine names of the Trebižat river ===
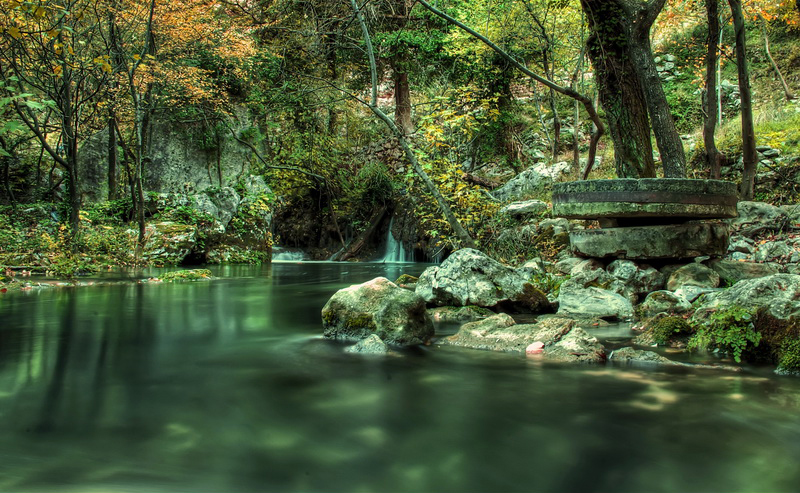
After rise in Peć-Mlini, river is named Tihaljina.

Because the Trebižat River disappears and reappears various times and places, the people used to call it different names. At least nine names are regularly used, and few other are known to be used as well – overall some thirteen names are known to be used at different point in times and/or by different communities along its course, at various location and for different sections: the Vrljika (from its original wellspring at Proložac to Kamenost (Podbablje)), the Matica (from Kamenmost in Croatia to Drinovci in Bosnia and Herzegovina), the Tihaljina (from wellspring at Peć Mlini to Mladi), the Mlade (from Mlade to Perila), the Stari Prokop and the Novi Prokop or the Kanal (from Perila to Jegetina), and the Trebižat (from Jegetina, through Ljubuško polje, till confluence with the Neretva in village Struge near Čapljina); also at various places the river is called Brina, Culuša, Ričina, Suvaja (at Posušje), and Rika.

== Waterfalls ==
A special characteristic of Bosnia and Herzegovina's water systems are the plethora of waterfalls dotting the landscape. Among the most beautiful and biggest are the: Štrbački cascade (23.5 m high – quantitatively the biggest waterfall in Bosnia and Herzegovina), Martin Brod on the Una River, Pliva Falls in Jajce (27 m), Kravice Falls and Koćuša falls on the Trebižat River.

=== Kravica Falls ===
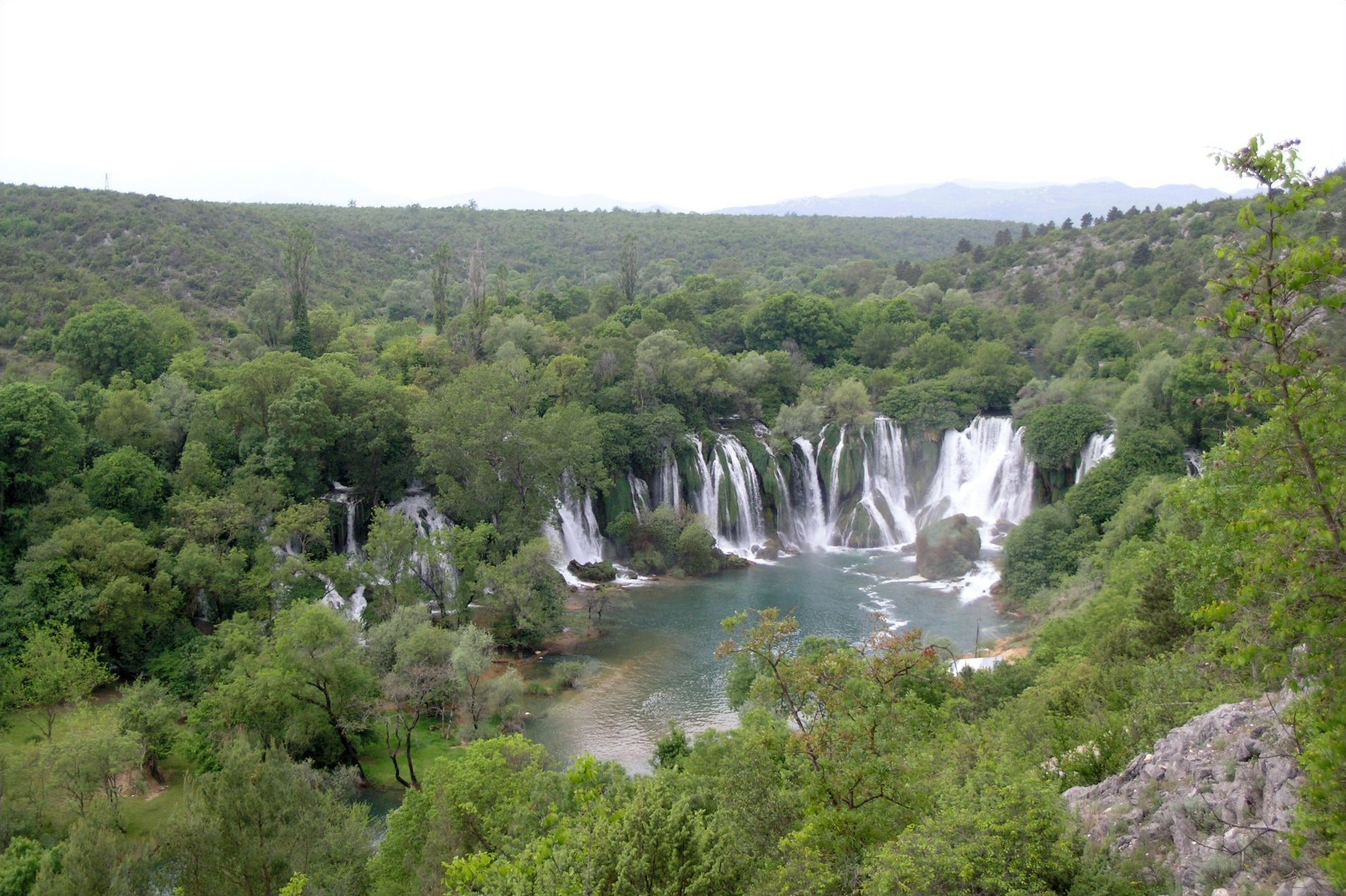
Waterfalls of Kravica, Bosnia and Herzegovina

The most attractive landmark on the Trebižat River is Kravice Falls, located 3 km downstream from the Vitaljina, in Studenci near Ljubuški. Similar to Krka Falls and Plitvice Lakes, Trebižat River is also in a constant process of natural tufa deposit. It is known that travertine barriers and waterfalls can grow only in water of high purity and quality, so it is not strange that the landscape of a natural phenomenon that is Trebižat was proposed for protection as a Nature Park by concerned NGO's in Bosnia and Herzegovina on more than a few occasions.

=== Koćuša Falls ===
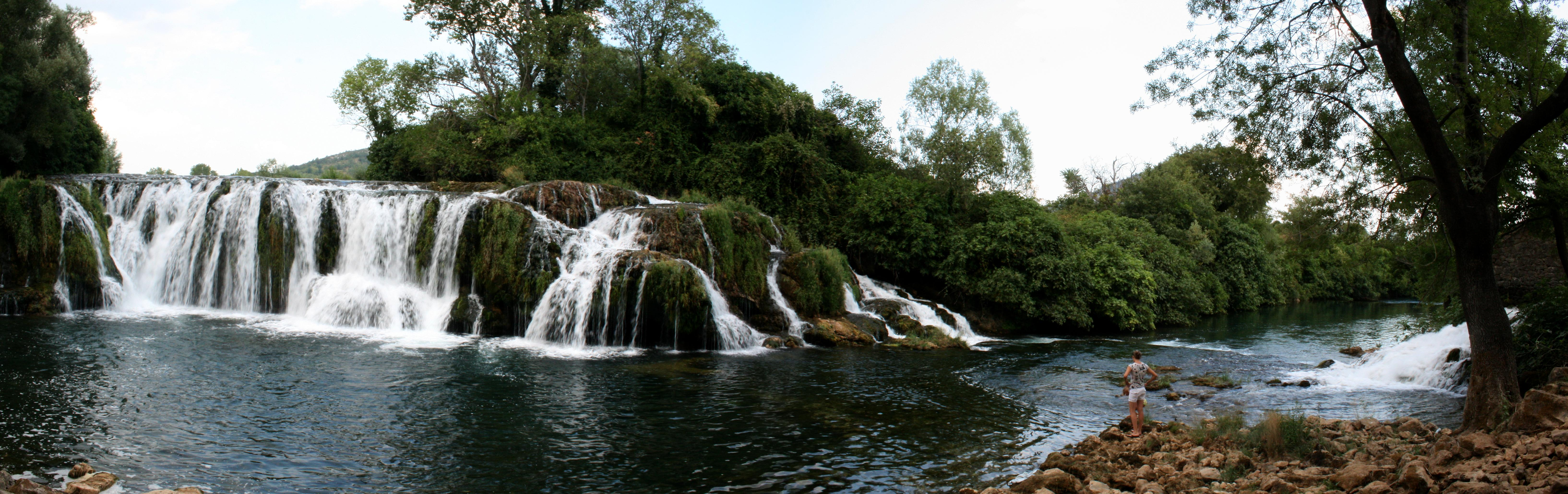
Koćuša Falls on the Trebižat River - yet another karst jewel of Bosnia and Herzegovina.

=== Ćeveljuša Falls ===
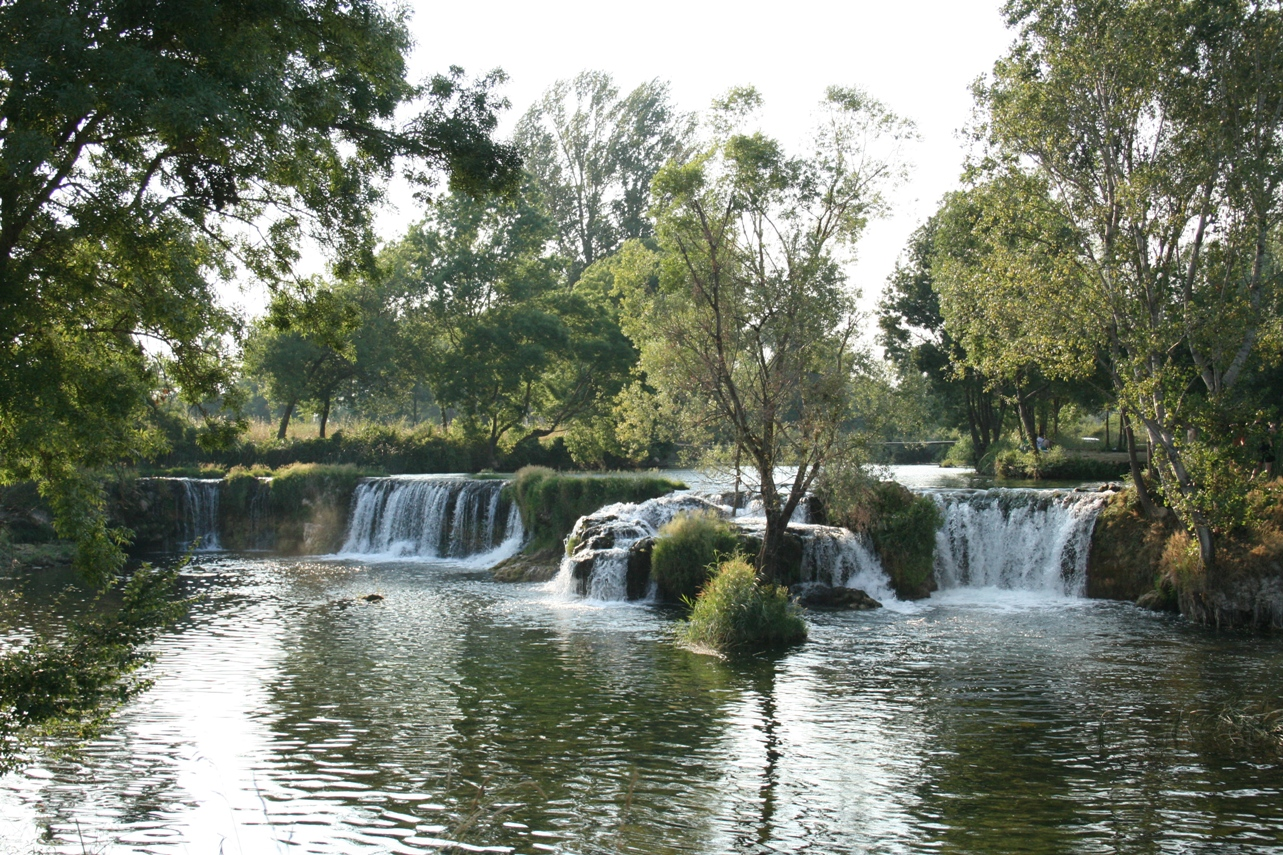
Tufa barriere of Ćeveljuša Falls is in its early stage of formation

== Waters utilization ==
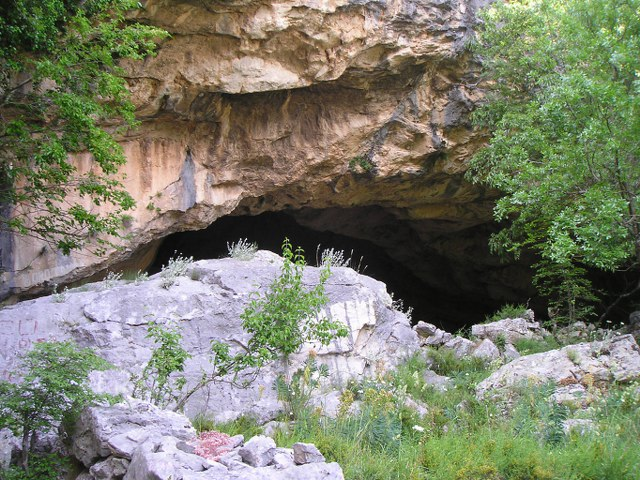
Ravlića Cave in the cliffs above the river wellspring, one of sites in the area inhabited from early Neolithic to early Bronze Age

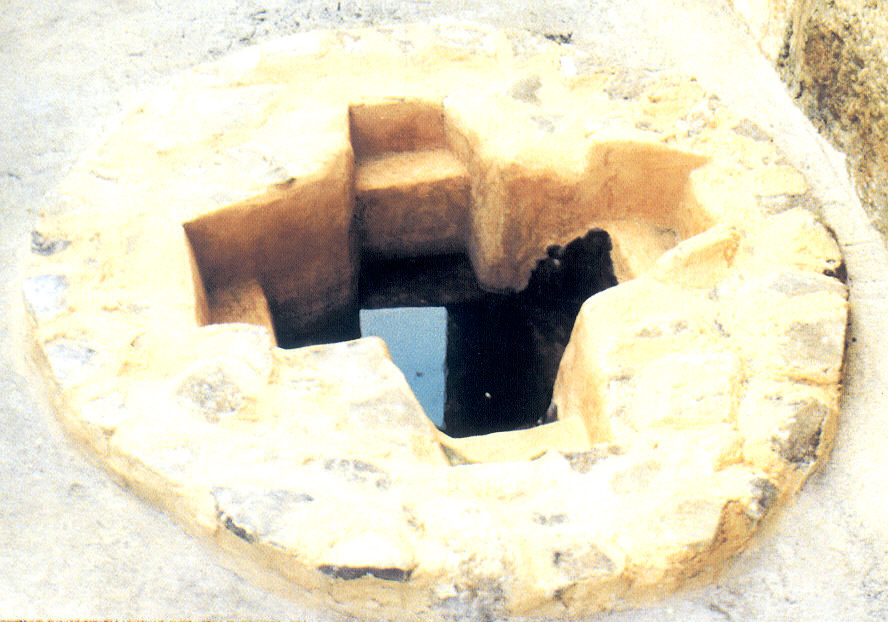
Early Christian site

Since time immemorial the Trebižat valley was inhabited by men thanks to its advantageous natural environment. Karst provided safe habitat with abundance of caves, fresh waters supply, fertile land with variety of natural produce. During antiquity valley was part of the Roman Dalmatia, inhabited by Illyrians, with farming already at high level of development. Many Roman settlements and farms were discovered in the region, with villas, such as Mogorjelo, as focal point of farming life and representative archaeological find, as well as later antiquity basilikas being excavated in the area. During medieval times area belonged to powerful Bosnian magnate family of Kosača, and later came under Ottoman rule. Agriculture was always primary enterprise for the inhabitants of the Trebižat valley and wider region, so is today. Waters of the river playing a key role in it. In recent times hydroelectric power plant Peć Mlini was built alongside the river's wellspring in Peć Mlini, at the site where Vrljika/Matica sinks and reappears as Tihaljina/Trebižat, practically traversing sink-hole. HPP Peć Mlini generates 2×15.3 MW.

== Ecology and protection ==
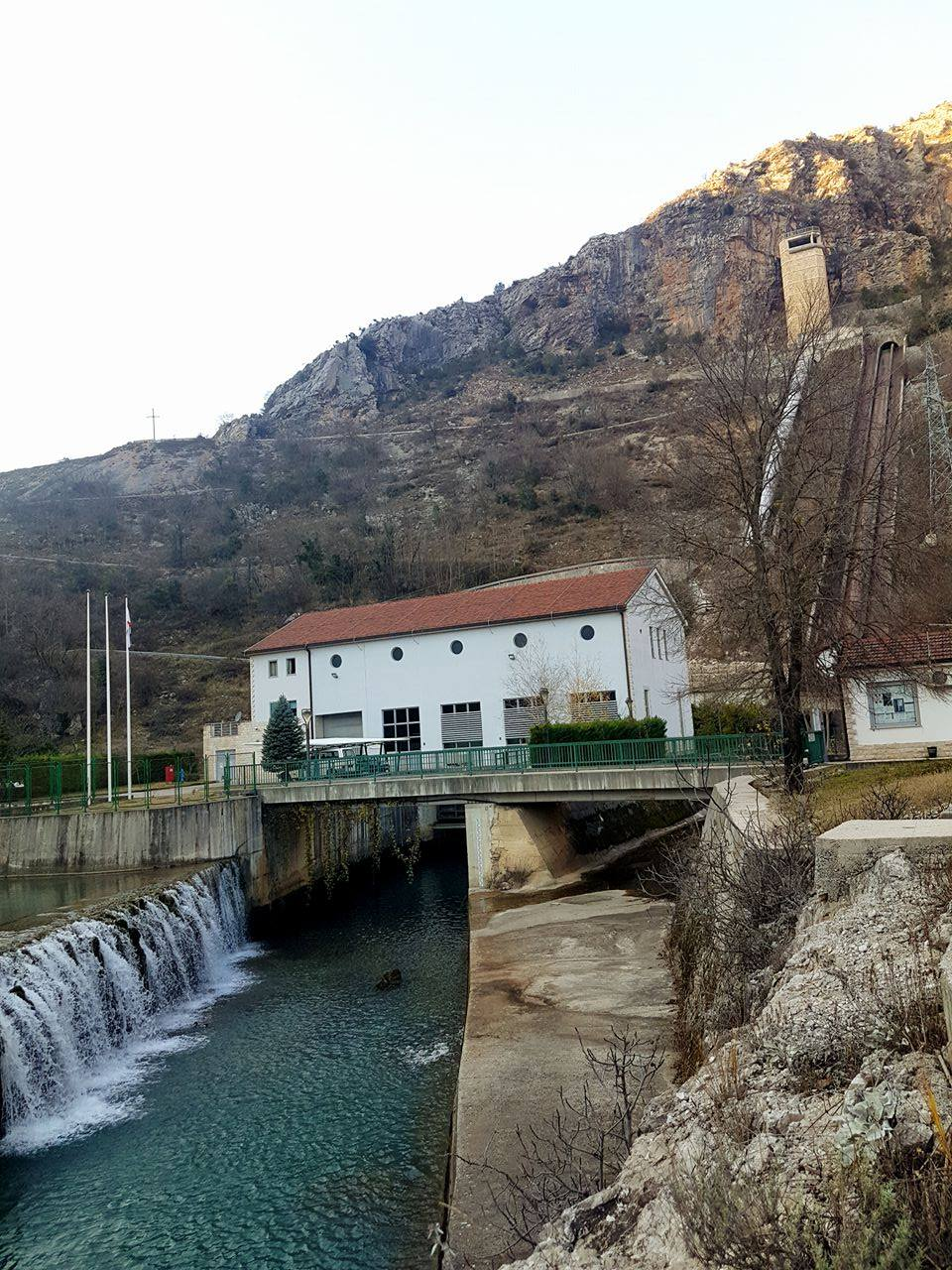
HE Peć Mlini

The water regime of the Trebižat River is affected by the extraction of its water for hydropower plants, irrigation and fish farming, and the river suffers from some pollution. Trebižat River flows through an area of remarkable ecological value, hosting protected areas such as the travertine formation around Kravice Waterfall. Although there have been many negative anthropogenic impacts in recent years on the Trebižat River, especially from hydropower and irrigation exploitation, unchecked urbanization and tourism, the analyses of aquatic organisms, river ecology and river morphology still shows a high ecoloical diversity, despite high level of endangerment. Various actions are considered with the aim of preserving the Trebižat River and its riparian ecosystem. The area was assessed in terms of its geography, climate conditions, historic heritage of the river, demography, geology of the river and its tributaries, river hydrology and morphology, ecological characteristics, river pollution, river use, and river management.

== See also ==
- Krupa
- Bregava
- Trebišnjica
