= Koćuša (waterfall) =

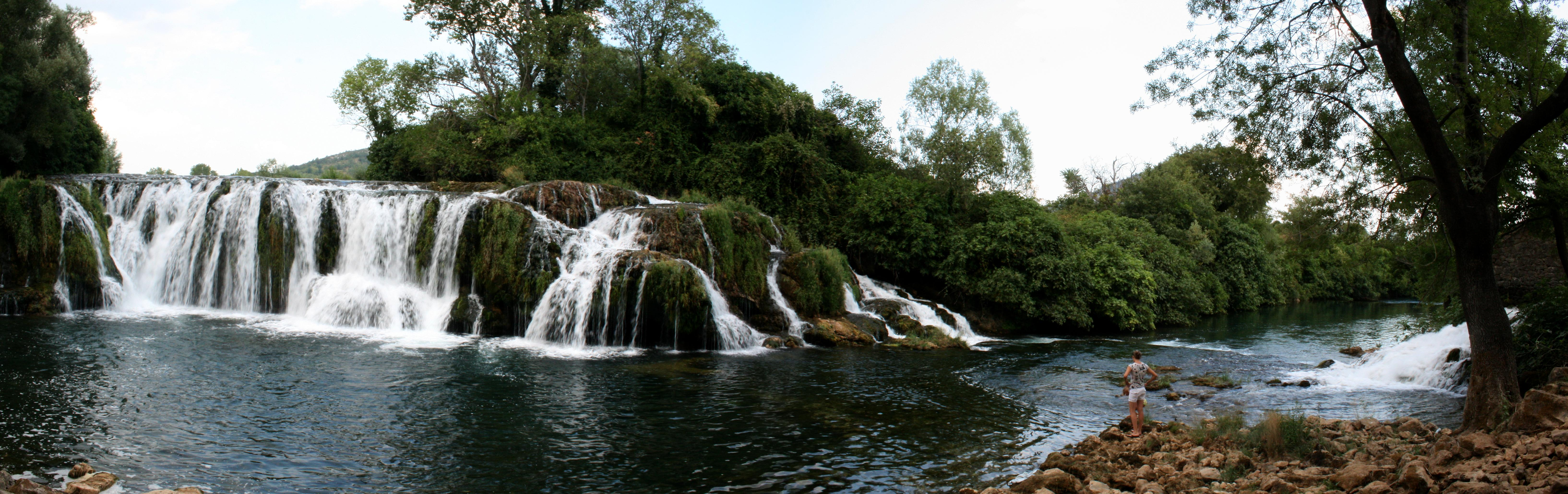

- Location within Bosnia and Herzegovina
- Location: Ljubuški, Bosnia and Herzegovina
- Coordinates: 43°14′57.42″N 17°27′8.06″E
- Total height: 5 metres (16 ft)
- Watercourse: Trebižat

Koćuša is a waterfall in village Veljaci located 10 km from Ljubuški, Bosnia and Herzegovina. Its height is about 5 m.

Koćuša impresses above all with its width of more than fifty meters, which together with five meters of height slopes, makes an imposing water slide.

The Koćuša waterfall is part of the Trebižat River system, a karst river known for a series of waterfalls and travertine formations in western Herzegovina. The waterfall’s flow varies seasonally, with the highest water levels typically occurring in spring.

Koćuša holds local cultural significance as a natural landmark of the Ljubuški area and is frequently featured in regional tourism materials and photography.
