= Imotsko Polje =

Karstic field in Croatia and Herzegovina

- Location within Croatia Location within Bosnia and Herzegovina
- Floor elevation: 248–283 m (814–928 ft)
- Area: 95 km^{2} (37 mi^{2})

Geography
- Country: Croatia, Bosnia and Herzegovina
- State/Province: Split-Dalmatia County, West Herzegovina
- Population center: Imotski
- Coordinates: 43.43°N 17.2°E
- Mountain range: Dinaric Alps
- Rivers: Ričina; Vrljika
- Interactive map of Imotsko Polje

Imotsko polje, NW part

Imotsko Polje (lit. 'Field of Imotski') is a polje (karstic field) located on the border of Croatia and Bosnia and Herzegovina near the city of Imotski. The larger part is in Herzegovina, while the Croatian part is in the inner Dalmatia region, and is the second largest in the country, covering an area of 95 square kilometres (37 sq mi).
