= Vrljika =

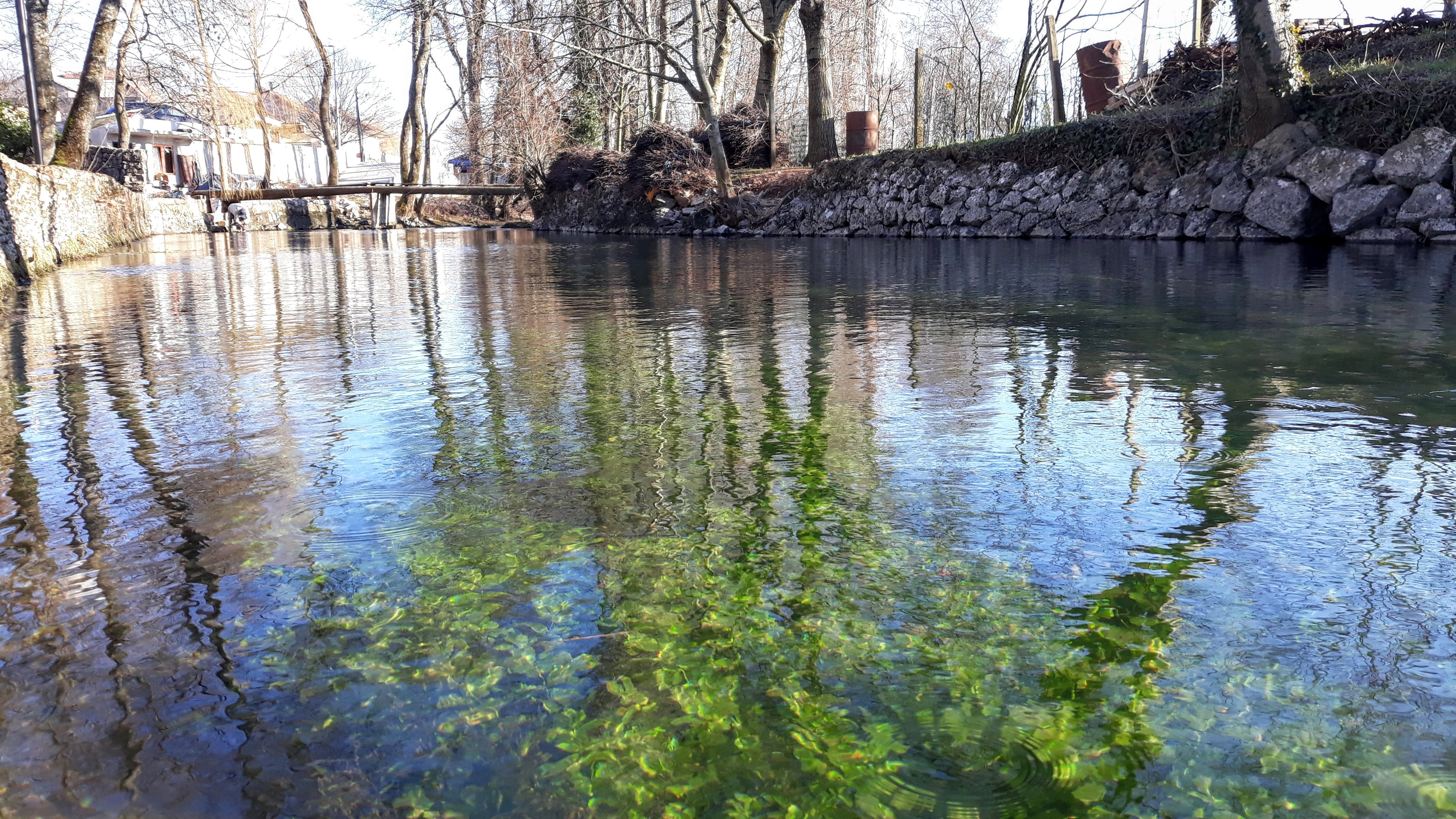

- Vrljika in Croatia and Bosnia and Herzegovina

Location
- Countries: Croatia; Bosnia and Herzegovina

Physical characteristics
- Source
  - location: Proložac
  - coordinates: 43.456764°N 17.175021°E
- Mouth: Nuga artificial lake/compensational basin for HPP Peć-Mlini
  - location: Drinovci
  - coordinates: 43.356426°N 17.305303°E

Basin features
- Progression: Vrljika→ Matica→ Tihaljina→ Mlade→ Trebižat→ Neretva→ Adriatic Sea
- River system: Neretva

The Vrljika is short sinking river in Croatia and Bosnia and Herzegovina, belonging to Neretva River basin. Its source is located on the outskirts of village Proložac near town of Imotski, Croatia. The Vrljika River is home of endangered endemic Softmouth trout, also known as Adriatic trout.

== Rare hydrogeology ==
The Vrljika River is a sinking river, typical of diverse karstic hydrology of Dinaric Alps in Croatia and Bosnia and Herzegovina. Rising from a strong karstic spring, it flows often short stretches before it sinks again.

=== Nine names of the Trebižat River ===
Because the Trebižat (river) disappears and reappears at resurgences various times, the people used to call it different names. Exactly nine names are known (every time it resurfaced, the river got a new name): Vrlika - Matica - Tihaljina - Mlade - Suvaja (Posušje) - Culuša - Ričina - Brina - Trebižat.

== Endemic and endangered trout ==
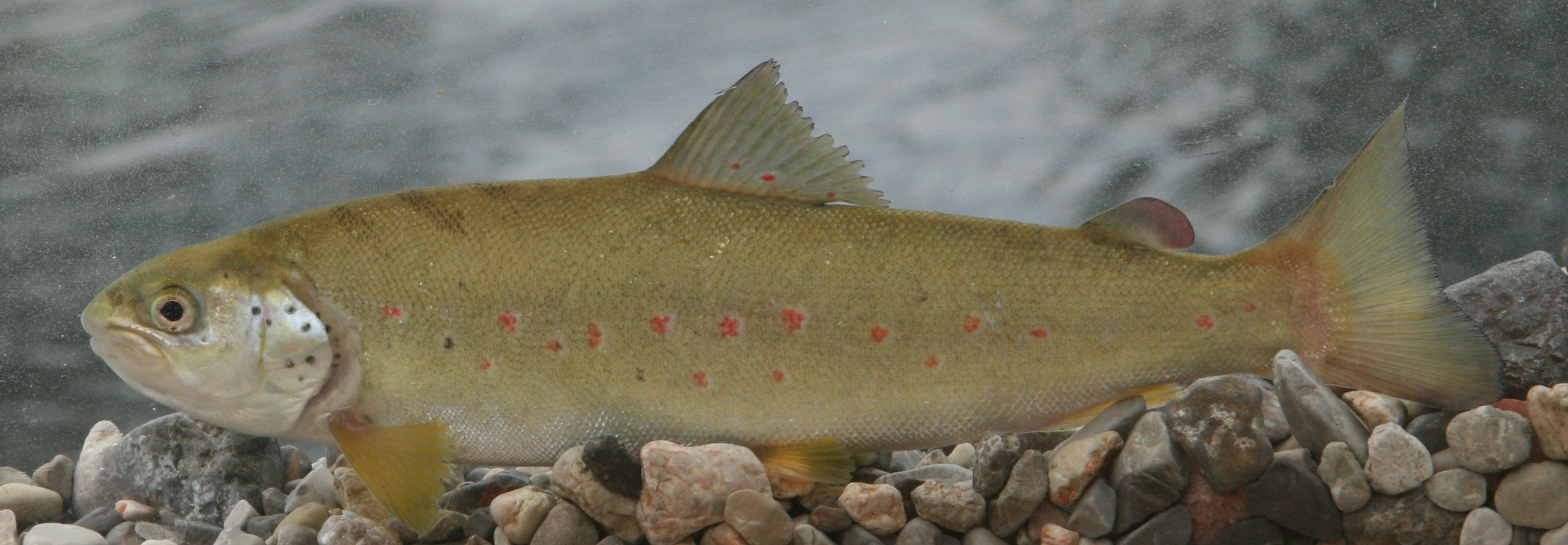
Softmouth trout of the Vrljika River sub-species

Dinaric karst water systems support 25% of the total of 546 fish species in Europe, many endemic. The degree of endemism in the karst ecoregion is greater than 10%. The Neretva River basin, together with four other areas in the Mediterranean, has the largest number of threatened freshwater fish species. Among most endangered is rare and endemic species of trout, a Softmouth trout, also known as Adriatic trout (Salmo obtusirostris)

== See also ==
- List of rivers in Bosnia and Herzegovina
