= Struge, Čapljina =

Struge
- Village
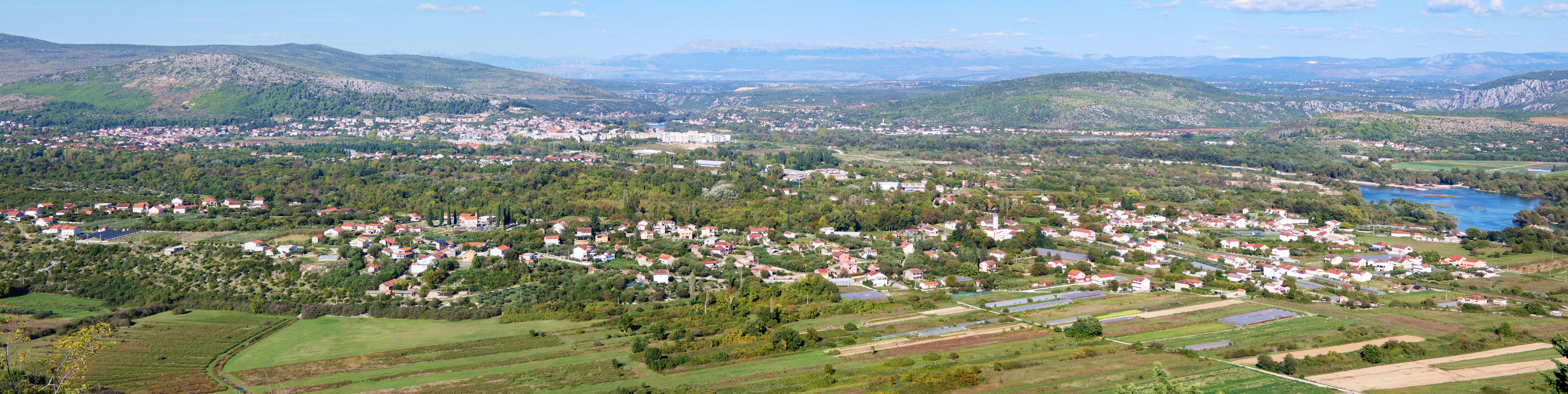

- Location within Bosnia and Herzegovina
- Coordinates: 43°06′N 17°42′E
- Country: Bosnia and Herzegovina
- Entity: Federation of Bosnia and Herzegovina
- Canton: Herzegovina-Neretva
- Municipality: Čapljina

Area
  - Total: 0.34 sq mi (0.87 km^{2})

Population (2013)
  - Total: 433
  - Density: 1,300/sq mi (500/km^{2})
- Time zone: UTC+1 (CET)
  - Summer (DST): UTC+2 (CEST)

Struge is a village in Bosnia and Herzegovina. According to the 1991 census, it is in the municipality of Čapljina.

== Demographics ==
According to the 2013 census, its population was 433.

Ethnicity in 2013
Ethnicity	Number	Percentage
Croats	341	78.8%
Bosniaks	75	17.3%
other/undeclared	17	3.9%
Total	433	100%
