= Operation Jackal =

1992 offensive of the Bosnian War

Coordinates: 43.08°N 17.96°E

- Part of the Bosnian War and the Croatian War of Independence
- Location of Mostar, Stolac and Čapljina in Bosnia and Herzegovina and in relation to Dubrovnik
Date	7 – 26 June 1992
Location	Bosnia and Herzegovina
Result	Croatian victory

Belligerents
Croatia; Herzeg-Bosnia	Republika Srpska

Commanders and leaders
(Croatia) Janko Bobetko	(Republika Srpska) Radovan Grubač

Units involved
Croatian Army; Croatian Defence Council; Croatian Defence Forces	Army of Republika Srpska

Strength
4,670 soldiers	Unknown

Operation Jackal (Serbo-Croatian: Operacija Čagalj), also known as Operation June Dawns (Operacija Lipanjske zore), was an offensive of the Bosnian War fought between a combined Croatian Army (HV), Croatian Defence Forces (HOS) and Croatian Defence Council (HVO) army against the Army of Republika Srpska (VRS) from 7–26 June 1992. The offensive was a Croatian pre-emptive strike against the VRS, a Bosnian Serb military formed in May 1992 from Yugoslav People's Army (JNA) units that were stationed in Bosnia and Herzegovina. The HV concluded that the JNA offensive operations of April and May 1992, resulting in the capture of Kupres and much of the Neretva River valley south of Mostar, were aimed at capturing or threatening the Croatian Port of Ploče and possibly Split. To counter this threat, the Croatian leadership deployed the HV, under the command of General Janko Bobetko, to the "Southern Front" including the area in which Operation Jackal was to be conducted.

The offensive marked the first significant Bosnian Serb defeat in the war and placed the HV in a favourable position to push back the VRS and remnants of the JNA holding positions north and east of Dubrovnik. The HV later re-established overland links with the city which had been under siege by the JNA since late 1991. The attack resulted in an HV/HVO victory and the capture of approximately 1,800 square kilometres (690 square miles) of territory in and around Mostar and Stolac.

== Background ==
In August 1990, a Serbian uprising occurred in Croatia centred on the Dalmatian hinterland around the city of Knin, parts of the Lika, Kordun, and Banovina regions, as well as in settlements in eastern Croatia with significant Serb populations. The areas were subsequently named the Republic of Serbian Krajina (RSK). The RSK, supported by Serbia, declared its intention to integrate with Serbia, and was denounced by the Government of Croatia as a rebellion. Tensions rose and by March 1991 the Croatian War of Independence had broken out. With the disintegration of Yugoslavia, in June 1991 Croatia issued its declaration of independence which became official on 8 October after a three-month moratorium. The RSK then initiated a campaign of ethnic cleansing against Croatian civilians and most non-Serbs were expelled by early 1993.

In May 1991, the Croatian National Guard (ZNG), subsequently renamed the Croatian Army (HV) in November, was formed as a result of growing support for the RSK from the Yugoslav People's Army (JNA) and the inability of the Croatian Police to cope with the situation. The establishment of the military of Croatia was hampered by a UN arms embargo introduced in September. The final months of 1991 saw the fiercest fighting of the war culminating in the Battle of the Barracks, the Siege of Dubrovnik, and the Battle of Vukovar.

In January 1992, the Sarajevo Agreement was signed by representatives of Croatia, the JNA and the UN, and a ceasefire called. After a series of unsuccessful ceasefires, the United Nations Protection Force (UNPROFOR) was deployed to Croatia to supervise and maintain the agreement. The conflict largely passed on to entrenched positions, and the JNA soon retreated from Croatia into Bosnia and Herzegovina, where a new conflict was anticipated.

As the Yugoslav People's Army (Jugoslavenska narodna armija – JNA) withdrew from Croatia following the acceptance and start of implementation of the Vance plan, its 55,000 officers and soldiers born in Bosnia and Herzegovina were transferred to a new Bosnian Serb army, which was later renamed the Army of Republika Srpska (VRS). This reorganisation followed the declaration of the Serbian Republic of Bosnia and Herzegovina on 9 January 1992, ahead of the 29 February – 1 March 1992 referendum on independence of Bosnia and Herzegovina. This declaration would later be cited as a pretext for the Bosnian War. Bosnian Serbs began fortifying the capital, Sarajevo, and other areas on 1 March. On the following day, the first fatalities of the war were recorded in Sarajevo and Doboj. In the final days of March, the Bosnian Serb army bombarded Bosanski Brod with artillery, drawing a border crossing by the HV 108th Brigade in response. On 4 April, JNA artillery began shelling Sarajevo. The JNA and the VRS in Bosnia and Herzegovina faced the Army of the Republic of Bosnia and Herzegovina (ARBiH) and the Croatian Defence Council (HVO), reporting to the Bosniak-dominated central government and the Bosnian Croat leadership respectively, as well as the HV, which occasionally supported HVO operations.

== Prelude ==
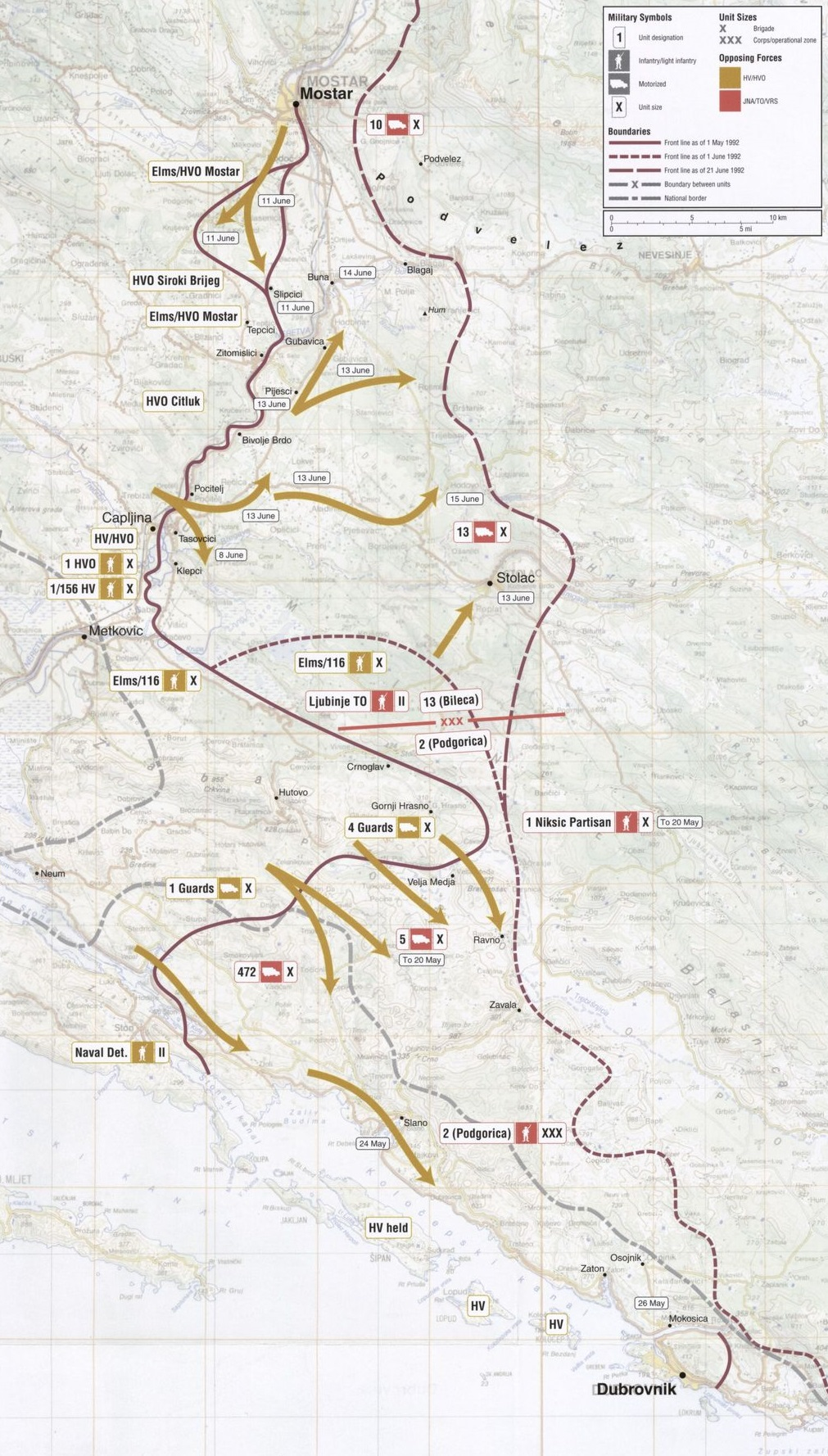
Map of Operation Jackal

In April 1992, the JNA renewed offensive operations against the HV and the HVO in areas of western and southern Herzegovina near Kupres and Stolac. The JNA's 2nd Military District, commanded by Colonel General Milutin Kukanjac, deployed elements of the 5th Banja Luka Corps and the 9th Knin Corps to the Kupres region, capturing the town from the HV and the HVO jointly defending the area in the 1992 Battle of Kupres on 7 April and threatening Livno and Tomislavgrad to the southwest. The 4th Military District of the JNA, commanded by General Pavle Strugar, employed the 13th Bileća Corps and the 2nd Titograd Corps to capture Stolac and most of the eastern bank of the Neretva River south of Mostar. The fighting around Mostar and JNA artillery attacks on the city started on 6 April, with the town of Široki Brijeg coming under attack by the Yugoslav Air Force on 7–8 April. While a Croatian attack of 9 April failed to capture a JNA-controlled airfield in Mostar, the Bosnian Serb Territorial Defence Force captured two nearby hydroelectric power plants on the Neretva River and the JNA pushed the HV/HVO force from Stolac on 11 April. Čapljina, 25 kilometres (16 miles) southwest from Mostar, came under intermittent JNA artillery and air attacks. A ceasefire was arranged on 7 May, but the JNA and the Bosnian Serb forces resumed the attack the next day. The attack succeeded in capturing a large part of Mostar and some territory on the west bank of the Neretva River. On 12 May, the transfer of JNA forces based in Bosnia and Herzegovina to the VRS was completed, and those JNA units which had not been transferred to the VRS withdrew from Bosnia and Herzegovina to the newly declared Federal Republic of Yugoslavia.

While the JNA planned the offensive to pre-empt a Croatian attack on Serb-held territory, Croatia saw the moves as a prelude to JNA attacks on southern Croatia, specifically aimed at the Port of Ploče and possibly Split. To counter the perceived threat, the HV deployed additional troops to the area redesignated as the "Southern Front". HV General Janko Bobetko, appointed to command the Southern Front, reorganised the HVO command structure and assumed command of the HVO in the area to stop the expected JNA/VRS offensive and regain the lost territory along the Neretva River. In late May, Bobetko launched an attack along the Adriatic coast, and in its immediate hinterland, towards besieged Dubrovnik linking up with the HV force in the city and breaking the JNA encirclement of the city by 1 June. The attack coincided with a JNA withdrawal towards Dubrovnik Airport in Konavle and positions within Bosnia and Herzegovina borders, 2 to 10 kilometres (1.2 to 6.2 miles) away from the coast. On 23 May, the HV/HVO captured the Hum Mountain south of Mostar.

== Order of battle ==
The HV and the HVO committed 4,670 troops to Operation Jackal. The HVO deployed various units stationed or raised in the area, mostly drawn from Mostar, Široki Brijeg, and Čitluk. The HV contributed the 4th Guards Brigade, elements of the 116th Infantry Brigade and the 156th Infantry Brigade. The HV troops were deployed around Čapljina, for the main attack across the Neretva River and on the right flank of the axis, while the HVO troops were deployed to their left, as well as in the Čapljina area. The VRS Herzegovina Corps (former JNA 13th Bileća Corps), commanded by Major General Radovan Grubač, consisted of the 10th and 13th Brigades as well as Ljubinje Territorial Defence troops in the area of Mostar and Stolac.

== Timeline ==
Operation Jackal, or alternatively Operation June Dawns, commenced on 7 June 1992. The attacking HV/HVO force moved east and north from Čapljina towards Stolac and Mostar aiming to push the VRS back from the Neretva River and capture positions around Mostar. The HV/HVO force captured the first objective of the offensive, the town of Tasovčići located across the Neretva River, opposite Čapljina, on 8 June. The HV component of the force which captured Tasovčići, the 156th Infantry Brigade, was detached from the force tasked with continued advance to capture Klepci and Prebilovci to protect the right flank of the Neretva bridgehead. The HV 116th Infantry Brigade held the Neretva River valley south of the bridgehead and east of Metković.

As the VRS Herzegovina Corps positions around Tasovčići collapsed, the attacking forces were able to quickly move east along its planned line of advance. On 11 June, the Mostar HVO forces attacked VRS positions on the west bank of the Neretva River, south of the city of Mostar in support of the main attack. The advance was immediately successful, capturing the villages of Varda, Kruševo, Jasenica, Slipčići and the Orlovac Mountain. The HVO captured JNA/VRS Heliport Barracks in Mostar the same day. On 12 June, the HVO pushed all remaining VRS forces east across the river.

The 1st Herzegovina Brigade of the HVO and the 156th Infantry Brigade advanced northeast from Čapljina and captured villages of Bivolje Brdo and Lokve ten kilometres (6.2 miles) away from the Neretva crossing point. The 116th Infantry Brigade, spearheading the Tactical Group-2, consisting of the brigade and supporting HVO troops, staged a rapid breakthrough and reached outskirts of Stolac, approximately 20 kilometres (12 miles) east of the Neretva crossing. The advance northeast towards Mostar continued north through Pijesci and Gubavica and reached the southern approaches to Mostar on 14 June. HVO units attacking from Čapljina secured Stolac by capturing VRS positions in Hodovo, approximately eight kilometres (5.0 miles) north of Stolac, on 15 June. The same day, the 4th Battalion of the Mostar HVO captured JNA "Sjeverni logor" barracks in Mostar while other elements of the HVO Mostar force captured nearby Fortica Hill overlooking the city. The final part of the northward advance of the force that set off from Čapljina was routed through the villages of Buna and Blagaj, which were also captured on 15 June. In order to complete a link up with the advancing HV and HVO units, the Mostar HVO forces, supported by the HV's 4th Battalion of the 4th Guards Brigade, moved south from the city through Jasenica. The two advancing forces met at the Mostar International Airport on 17 June.

The HV and the HVO completely pushed the VRS from Mostar, advancing further east along the slopes of the Velež Mountain and capturing high ground overlooking the city by 21 June. The ARBiH supported the eastward push from the city only in a secondary role. Even though the front lines did not move significantly to the east, the city of Mostar was relatively secure from future VRS attacks. The offensive is considered to have ended on 26 June, when the HVO captured the Merdžan Glava peak of the Velež Mountain.

== Aftermath ==
The HV and the HVO captured approximately 1,800 square kilometres (690 square miles) of territory during Operation Jackal, and the supporting attacks around Mostar, as well as handing the VRS their first significant defeat in the Bosnian War. The offensive removed a direct threat posed by the JNA and the VRS to Metković, and it accomplished the Croatian objective of capturing positions that were favourable to staging further offensives against JNA and VRS forces still positioned near Dubrovnik. The follow-up Operation Tiger was the first HV offensive to exploit the success of Operation Jackal and improve Croatian military positions on the Southern Front in general but specifically around Dubrovnik. HV deployment to Bosnia and Herzegovina not only gained them significant experience in the execution of large-scale military offensives, but also denied the Bosnian Serb VRS forces the chance to pursue a decisive victory.
