= Orašlje massacre =

- Part of the Croat–Bosniak War
- Location: Orašlje in Stolac, Bosnia and Herzegovina
- Date: 13 July 1993
- Target: Bosniaks
- Attack type: Mass killing
- Deaths: 15
- Perpetrator: Croatian Defence Council (HVO)

The Orašlje massacre was the mass murder of approximately 15 Bosniak civilians by members of the Croatian Defence Council in June 1993, during the Croat–Bosniak War. There was a massacre at the same place committed by the Ustaše and the Germans 50 years before this one.

== Background ==
On 12 July 1943, the German army, with the help of Ustaše, liquidated local Bosniaks from Orašlje.

The crime occurred when the Germans found out that the Bosniaks of Orašlje were hiding partisans and helping the national liberation movement. The news that the partisans were hiding in Orasalje reached the Germans through the Ustasha prefect and lawyer Jakiša Milković, who soon launched a criminal expedition. The task was entrusted to units of the 7th SS volunteer division "Prince Eugen".

At dawn on July 12, German troops, without announcement, surrounded the hamlet of Orašje, arriving from Mostar, Domanović and Stolac. The SS criminals forced all the peasants they found in the field to enter the houses and barns, which they then broke into and opened fire, killing everyone they found, not distinguishing between men, women and children. Babies in bladders were not spared either. Among those killed were 25 children under the age of 15. The youngest victims were newborn babies of a few months.

After killing the locals, the Germans set fire to all the houses and barns. "Rare individuals escaped wounded lying among the dead. They managed to crawl out of the burning houses, or escape to save themselves, to tell the bitter fate of their families and neighbors.

== Crime ==
On 13 July 1993, exactly 50 years later, HVO and HV members committed the same crimes in the same place. The 15 inhabitants of Orašlje, from the same families, descendants of those killed in World War II, were killed. The youngest victim was Adis Bucman, he was only five years old. The oldest victim was Fatima Pehlić, she was 71 years old.

Local resident Meho Bucman lost his entire family. Only his father survived the crime in 1943, but not the one in 1993, when he died together with Meh's mother, brother, wife and children.

Locals say that apparently someone "took care" of the dates of the crime and do not believe in coincidence. They also lose faith that, after so many years, the judiciary will finally conduct an investigation and prosecute those responsible for the murders in 1993.
