= Opličići =

- Village
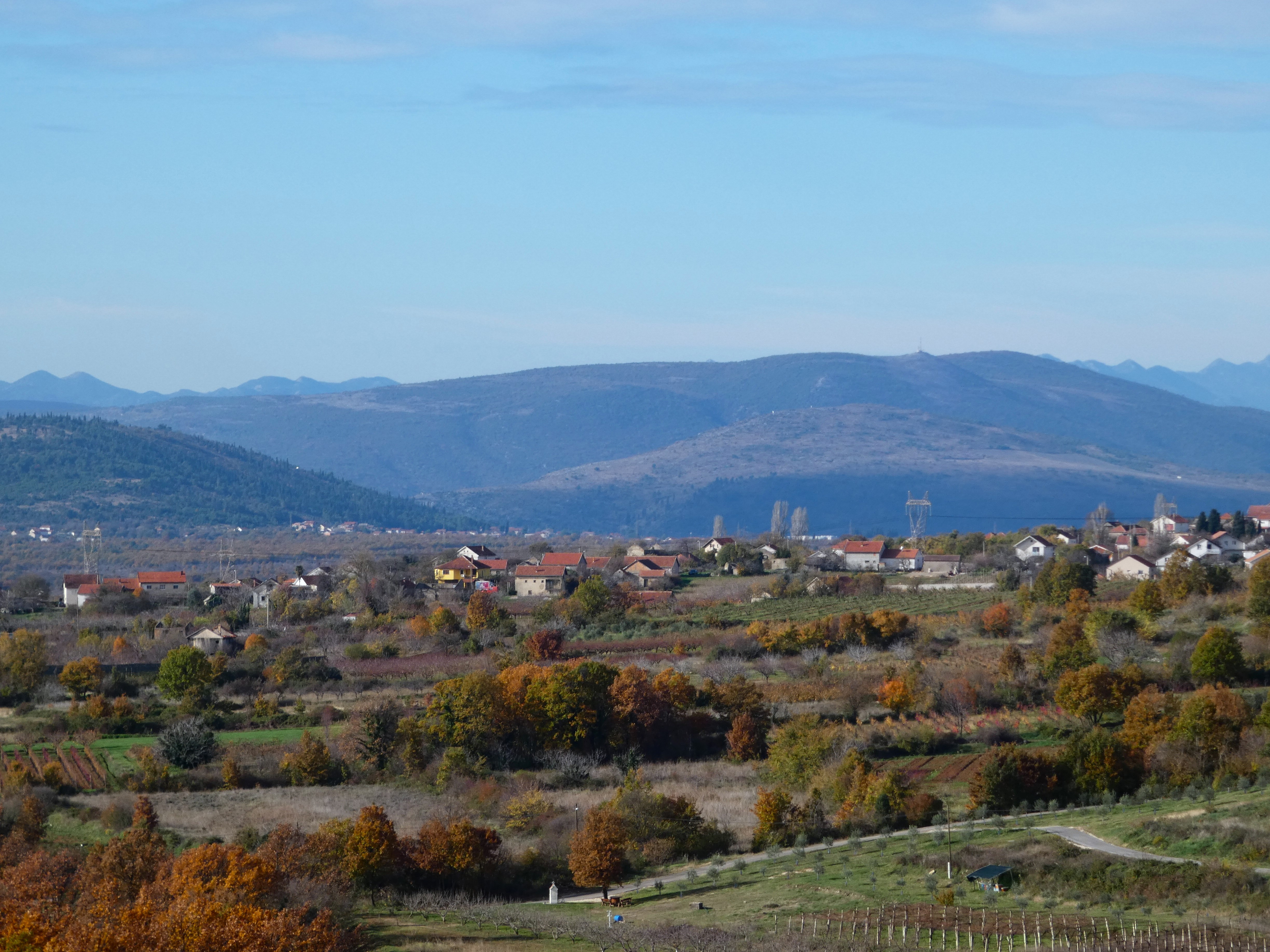

- Location within Bosnia and Herzegovina
- Country: Bosnia and Herzegovina
- Entity: Federation of Bosnia and Herzegovina
- Canton: Herzegovina-Neretva
- Municipality: Čapljina

Area
  - Total: 5.25 sq mi (13.59 km^{2})

Population (2013)
  - Total: 1,268
  - Density: 241.7/sq mi (93.30/km^{2})
- Time zone: UTC+1 (CET)
  - Summer (DST): UTC+2 (CEST)

Opličići is a village in Bosnia and Herzegovina. According to the 1991 census, the village is located in the municipality of Čapljina.

== Demographics ==
According to the 2013 census, its population was 1,268.

Ethnicity in 2013
Ethnicity	Number	Percentage
Bosniaks	741	58.4%
Croats	433	34.1%
Serbs	89	7.0%
other/undeclared	5	0.4%
Total	1,268	100%
