= Grabovina =

- Village
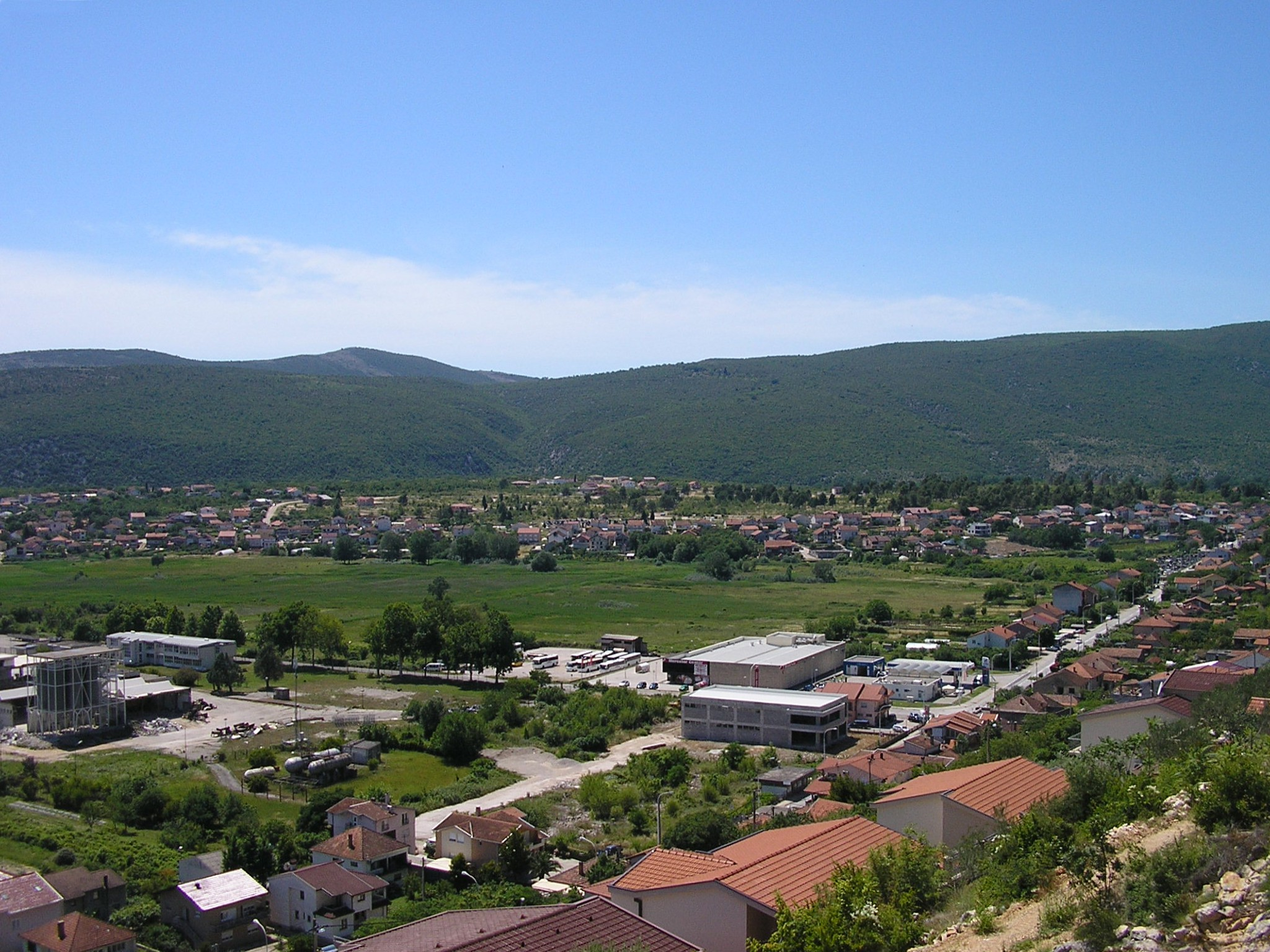

- Location within Bosnia and Herzegovina
- Coordinates: 43°07′N 17°41′E
- Country: Bosnia and Herzegovina
- Entity: Federation of Bosnia and Herzegovina
- Canton: Herzegovina-Neretva
- Municipality: Čapljina

Area
  - Total: 1.30 sq mi (3.36 km^{2})

Population (2013)
  - Total: 960
  - Density: 740/sq mi (290/km^{2})
- Time zone: UTC+1 (CET)
  - Summer (DST): UTC+2 (CEST)

Grabovina is a village in Bosnia and Herzegovina. According to the 1991 census, the village is located in the municipality of Čapljina.

== Demographics ==
According to the 2013 census, its population was 960.

Ethnicity in 2013
Ethnicity	Number	Percentage
Croats	920	95.8%
Serbs	24	2.5%
Bosniaks	12	1.3%
other/undeclared	4	0.4%
Total	960	100%
