= Dretelj =

- Village
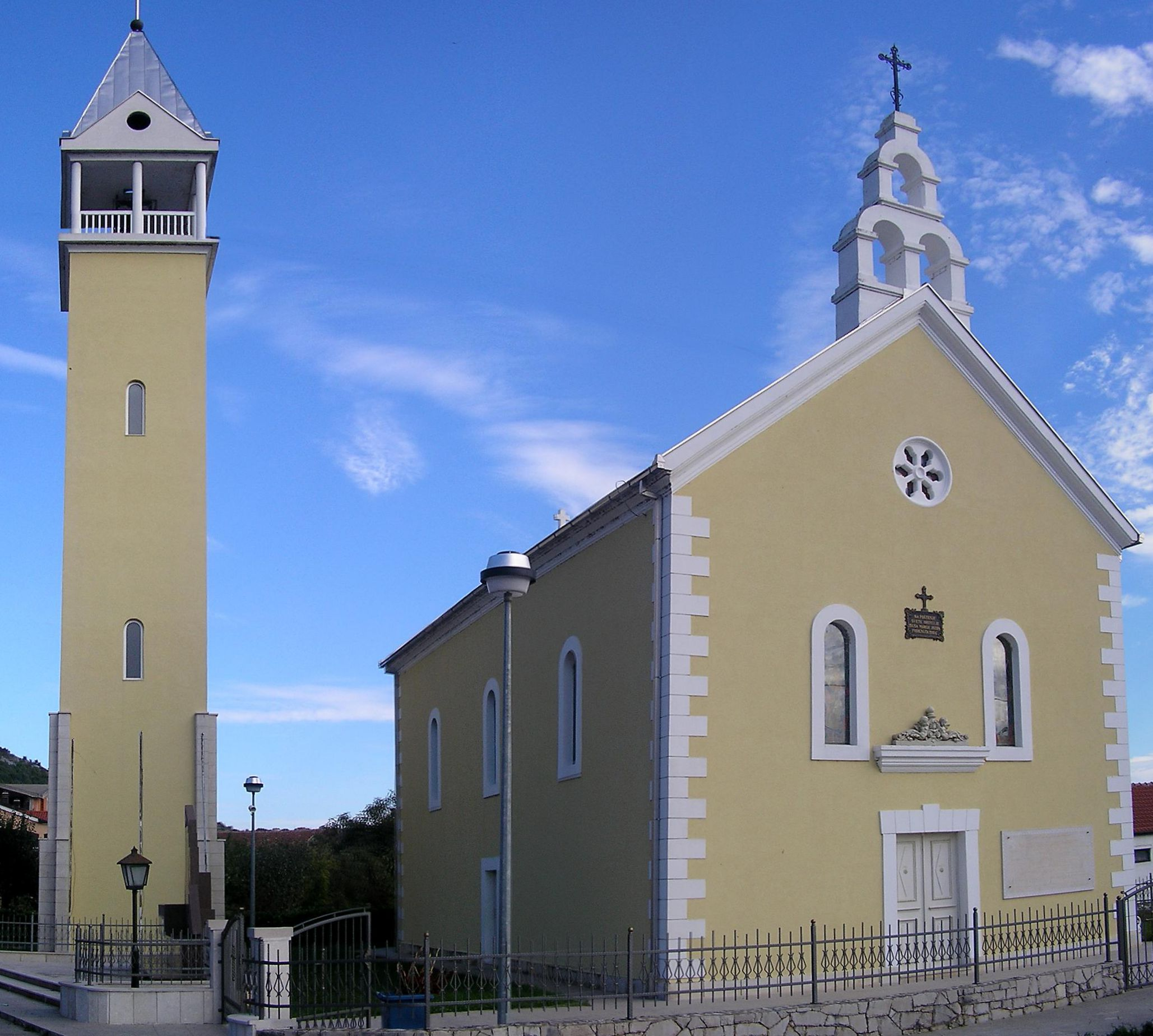
- Holy Family church in Dretelj

- Location within Bosnia and Herzegovina
- Country: Bosnia and Herzegovina
- Entity: Federation of Bosnia and Herzegovina
- Canton: Herzegovina-Neretva
- Municipality: Čapljina

Area
  - Total: 3.21 sq mi (8.32 km^{2})

Population (2013)
  - Total: 569
  - Density: 177/sq mi (68.4/km^{2})
- Time zone: UTC+1 (CET)
  - Summer (DST): UTC+2 (CEST)

Dretelj is a village in Bosnia and Herzegovina. According to the 1991 census, the village is located in the municipality of Čapljina.

== Demographics ==
According to the 2013 census, its population was 569.

Ethnicity in 2013
Ethnicity	Number	Percentage
Croats	553	97.2%
Bosniaks	10	1.8%
Serbs	1	0.2%
other/undeclared	5	0.9%
Total	569	100%
