= Prćavci =

- Village
- Location within Bosnia and Herzegovina
- Coordinates: 43°09′N 17°39′E
- Country: Bosnia and Herzegovina
- Entity: Federation of Bosnia and Herzegovina
- Canton: Herzegovina-Neretva
- Municipality: Čapljina

Area
  - Total: 1.24 sq mi (3.20 km^{2})

Population (2013)
  - Total: 255
  - Density: 206/sq mi (79.7/km^{2})
- Time zone: UTC+1 (CET)
  - Summer (DST): UTC+2 (CEST)

Prćavci is a village in Bosnia and Herzegovina. According to the 1991 census, the village is located in the municipality of Čapljina.

== Demographics ==
According to the 2013 census, its population was 255.

Ethnicity in 2013
Ethnicity	Number	Percentage
Croats	254	99.6%
Bosniaks	1	0.4%
Total	255	100%
