= Gorica, Čapljina =

Gorica
- Village
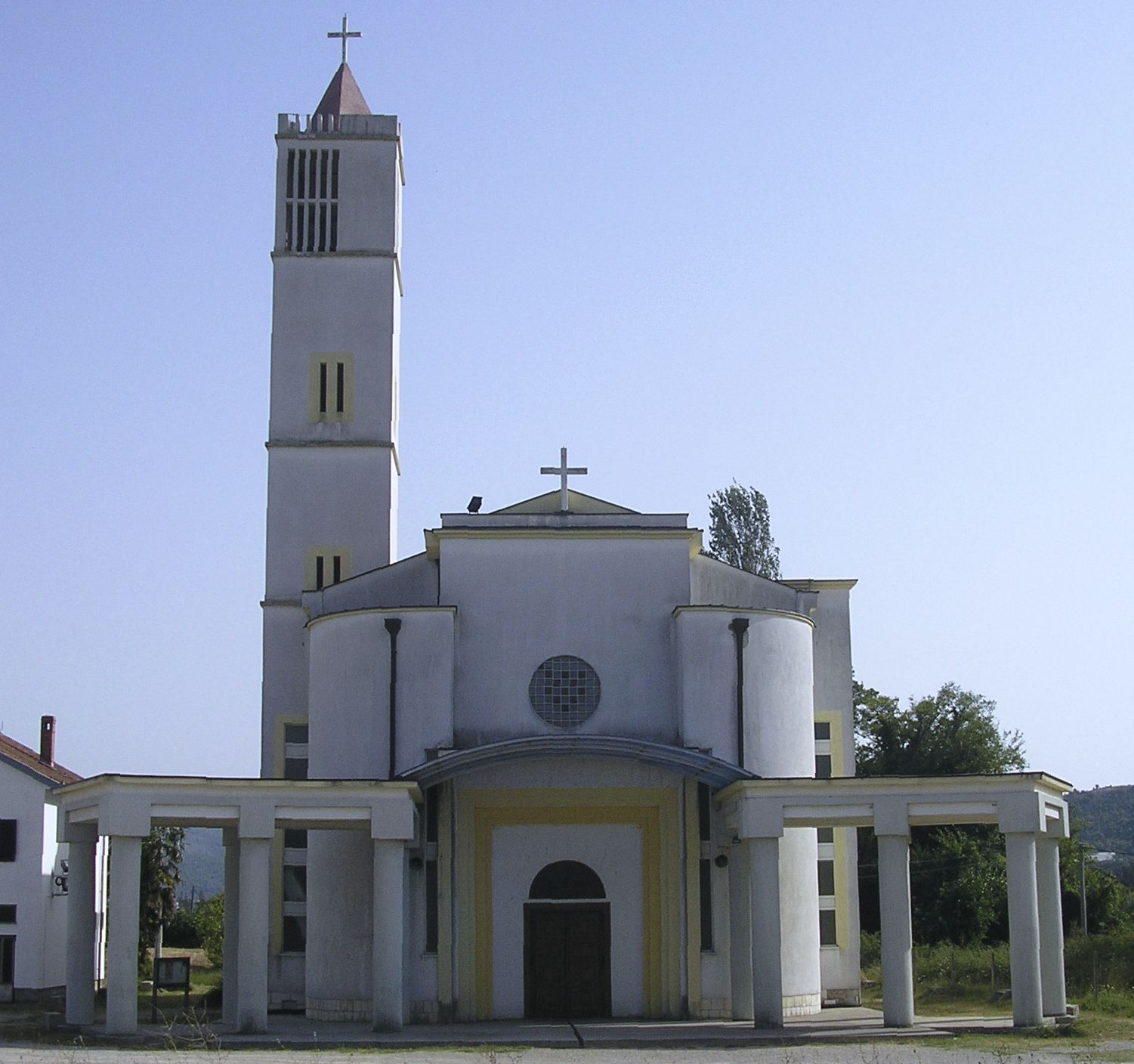
- Saint Peter and Paul's church, Gorica-Struge parish

- Location within Bosnia and Herzegovina
- Country: Bosnia and Herzegovina
- Entity: Federation of Bosnia and Herzegovina
- Canton: Herzegovina-Neretva
- Municipality: Čapljina

Area
  - Total: 0.67 sq mi (1.74 km^{2})

Population (2013)
  - Total: 442
  - Density: 658/sq mi (254/km^{2})
- Time zone: UTC+1 (CET)
  - Summer (DST): UTC+2 (CEST)

Gorica is a village in Bosnia and Herzegovina. According to the 1991 census, the village is located in the municipality of Čapljina.

== Demographics ==
According to the 2013 census, its population was 442.

Ethnicity in 2013
Ethnicity	Number	Percentage
Croats	400	90.5%
Bosniaks	38	8.6%
Serbs	1	0.2%
other/undeclared	3	0.7%
Total	442	100%
