= Čapljina =

Čapljina Чапљина
- City
- Grad Čapljina; Град Чапљина; City of Čapljina
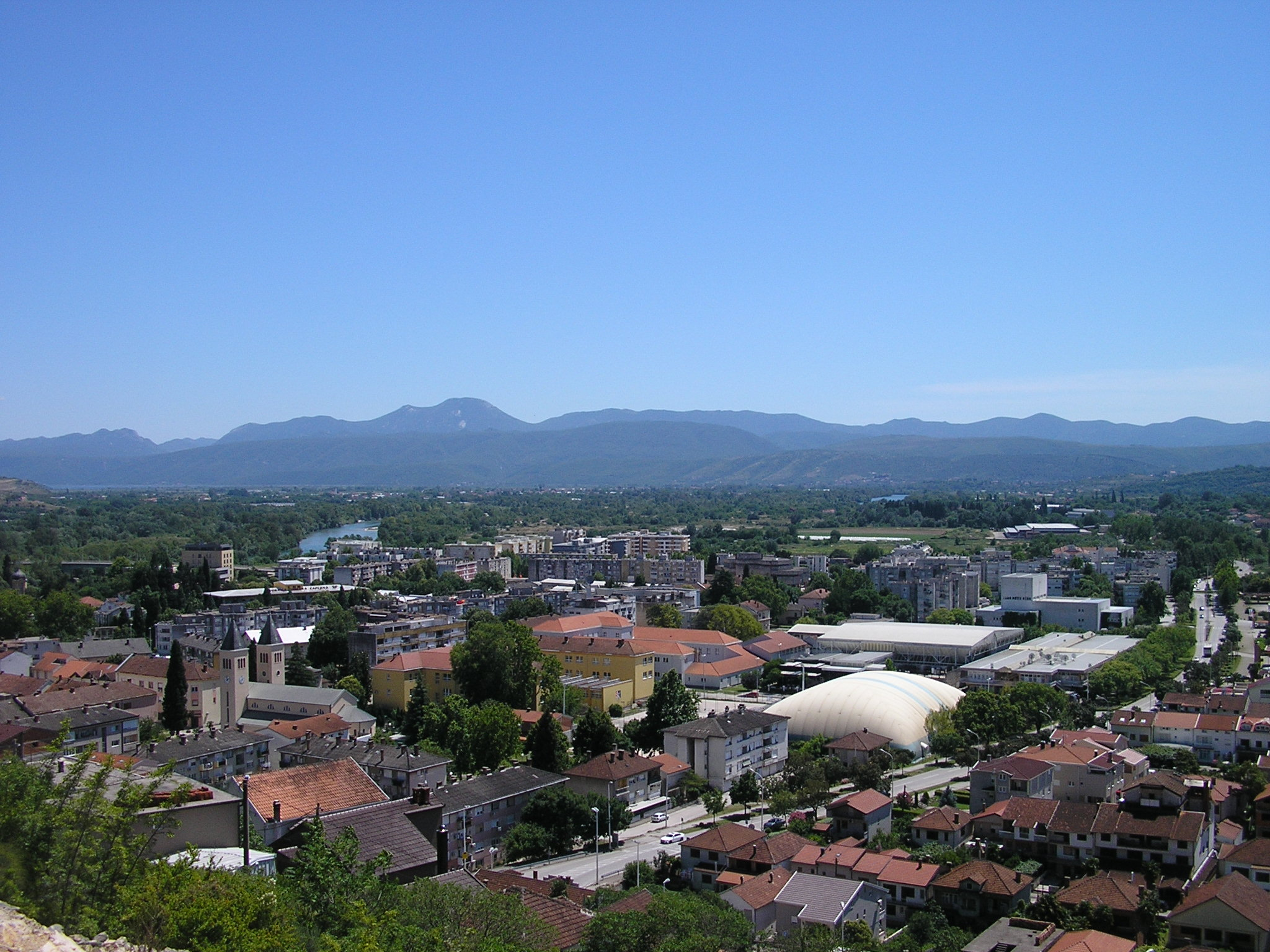
- Čapljina

- Flag Coat of arms

- Location of Čapljina within Bosnia and Herzegovina

- Location within Bosnia and Herzegovina
- Coordinates: 43°06′42.58″N 17°42′19.74″E
- Country: Bosnia and Herzegovina
- Entity: Federation of Bosnia and Herzegovina
- Canton: Herzegovina-Neretva
- Geographical region: Herzegovina

Government
  - Mayor: Iva Raguž (HDZ BiH)

Area
  - City: 256 km^{2} (99 sq mi)
  - Land: 256 km^{2} (99 sq mi)
  - Water: 0 km^{2} (0 sq mi)

Population (2013)
  - City: 28,122
  - Density: 110/km^{2} (285/sq mi)
  - Urban: 6,340
- Time zone: UTC+1 (CET)
  - Summer (DST): UTC+2 (CEST)
- Post code: 88300
- Area code: +387 36
- Website: www.capljina.ba

Čapljina (Cyrillic: Чапљина, pronounced [t͡ʃâpʎina]) is a city located in Herzegovina-Neretva Canton of the Federation of Bosnia and Herzegovina, an entity of Bosnia and Herzegovina. It is located on the border with Croatia a mere 20 kilometres (12 mi) from the Adriatic Sea.

The river Neretva flows through the city and flows into the Adriatic just over the border. The town's landmark is a statue of King Tomislav. The Church of Saint Francis of Assisi is also a prominent facet of the city. The city coat of arms contains the Croatian checkerboard, the nearby tower in Počitelj, and Saint Francis of Assisi.

The city has a rich archaeological history and untouched wilderness and is starting to develop agricultural tourism. It is also home to Hutovo Blato Park, which contains one of the most diverse bird populations in all Europe. The Croatian town of Metković is located just over the border and there are significant commercial and other links between the two towns.

== History ==
Not much is known about this city but it was founded by Romans in 5 BC. However, ancient Greek, and later Roman maps clearly show that the area was populated by several native Illyrian peoples, including the Ardiaei, whom the ancient geographer Strabo lists as one of the three strongest Illyrian peoples – the other two being the Autariatae and the Dardani.

Čapljina is situated in the wider Neretva valley region (the original homeland of ancient Illyrian people of Ardiaei), and its name derives from čaplja which means 'heron'. The Latin word for heron is ardea, a word that bears striking similarity with the name of Ardiaei, and it might possibly be its cognate. This theory opens up many possibilities for the interpretation of the original homeland of the Ardiaei and the etymology of their name. For example, heron might have had totemic pagan value among local Illyrians, due to its presence in this area, and it is not implausible to conclude that one of those Illyrian peoples named itself after a heron, the Ardiaei.

The Latin word ardea might be a Latin translation of some original Illyrian word for 'heron' that Romans found when they settled in this area, or the 'ardea' itself, could have been an Illyrian word taken by Romans, who might have slightly altered it and integrated it into their language, the Latin. Indeed, the word Ardiaei is found in ancient Greek sources predating the arrival of Romans and their language to the Illyrian lands. It is also possible that ancient Illyrians or Romans named this place 'the place of heron(s), and the Slavic settlers, who settled in the former Illyrian lands around 6th century A.D. translated the name of this place into their language(s), which in turn gave 'Čapljina', "the place of heron(s)".

The Prebilovci massacre, in which around 4,000 people (mainly Serbs) were killed total, including 300 villagers from the Prebilovci thrown into a pit, is one of the most significant atrocities in this area during the Genocide of Serbs in the Independent State of Croatia. Out of about 700 villagers from Prebilovci, fewer than 200 survived. As a revenge, In 1942, the Serbian royalist Chetniks attacked several villages in the Čapljina area. The village of Hotanj was burned, and many Croat and Bosniak civilians were killed.

Since World War II it has been an important road and rail transportation link, connecting the rest of Bosnia and Herzegovina with the port of Ploče in Croatia. During the 1992–1995 war in Bosnia and Herzegovina the city was taken over by the Croatian Defence Council, which expelled the non-Croat population and set up concentration camps for Bosniaks at Gabela camp and Dretelj camp.

During the summer of 2007 wildfires caused extensive damage throughout the rural part of the municipality. The officials of Čapljina, Stolac, Čitluk and Neum declared the state of natural disaster on their territories.

== Status ==
In May 2019, the Municipality of Čapljina became an official city.

== Settlements ==
- Bajovci
- Bivolje Brdo
- Bobanovo selo
- Crnići
- Čapljina
- Čeljevo
- Doljani
- Domanovići
- Dračevo
- Dretelj
- Dubravica
- Gabela
- Gabela Polje
- Gnjilišta
- Gorica
- Grabovina
- Hotanj
- Jasenica
- Klepci
- Lokve
- Modrič
- Opličići
- Počitelj
- Prćavci
- Prebilovci
- Sjekose
- Stanojevići
- Struge
- Svitava
- Ševaš Njive
- Šurmanci
- Šuškovo
- Tasovčići
- Trebižat
- Višići
- Zvirovići

== Demographics ==
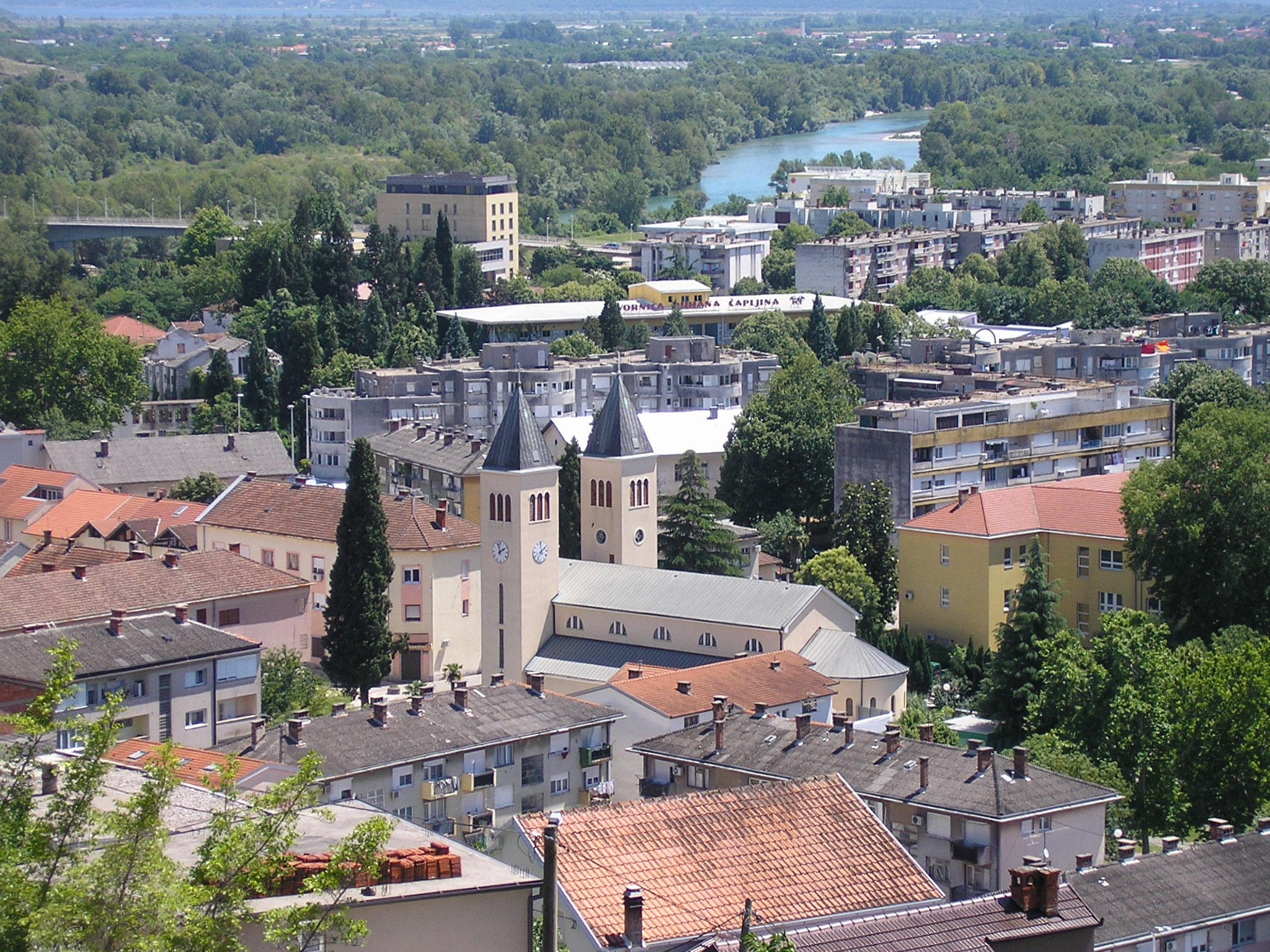
A view of the city centre.

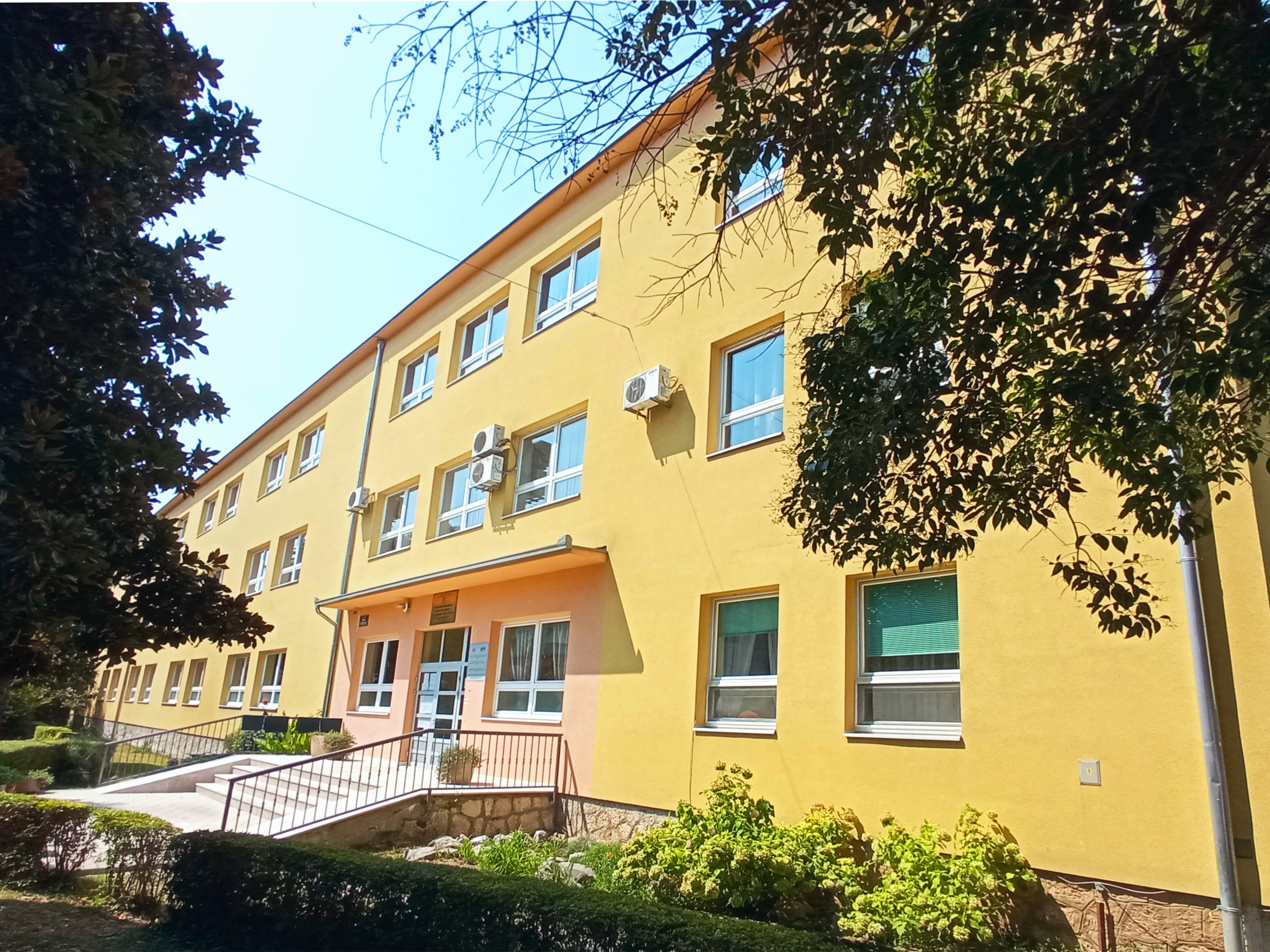
The elementary school "Vladimir Pavlović".

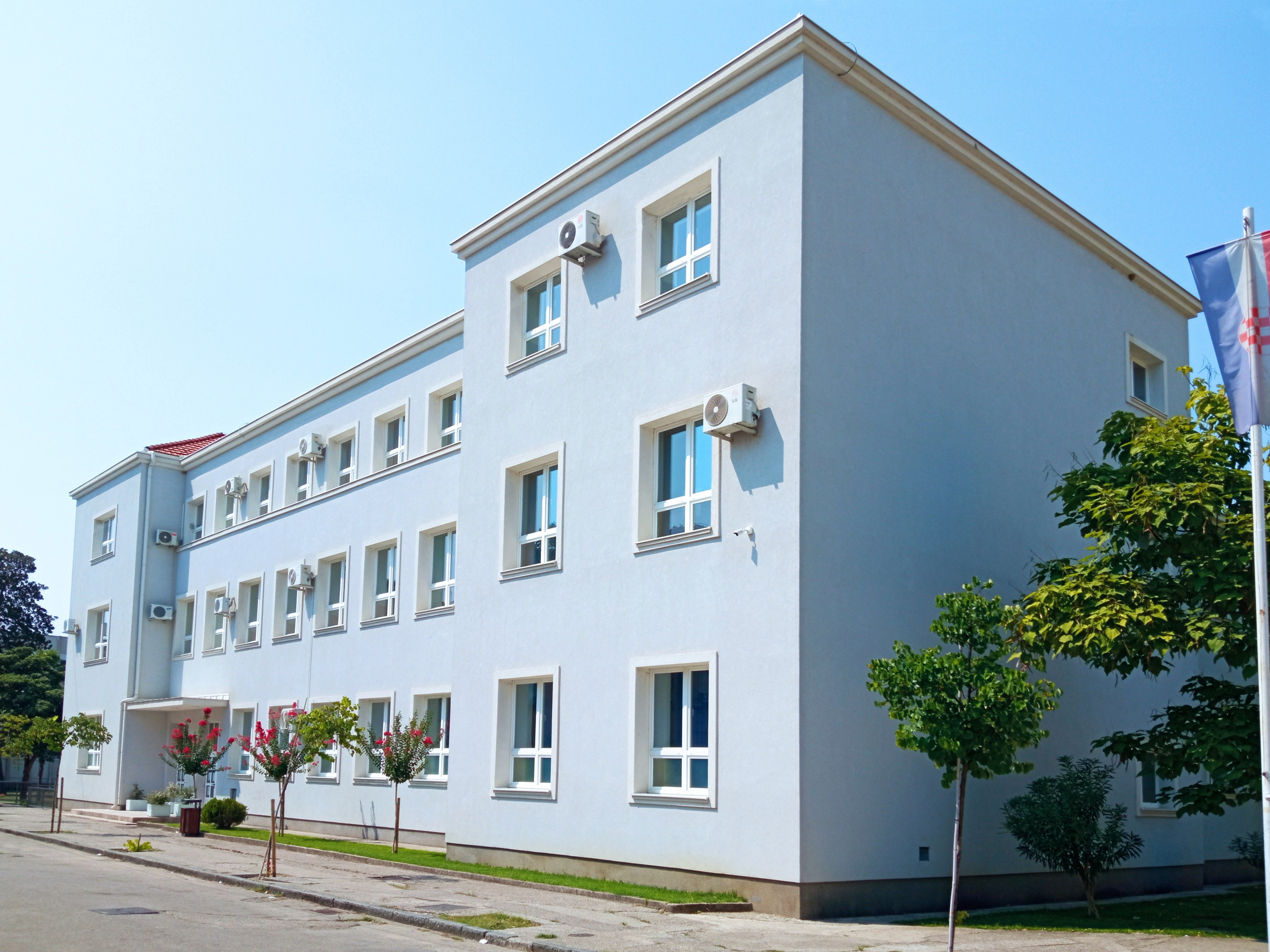
A high school.

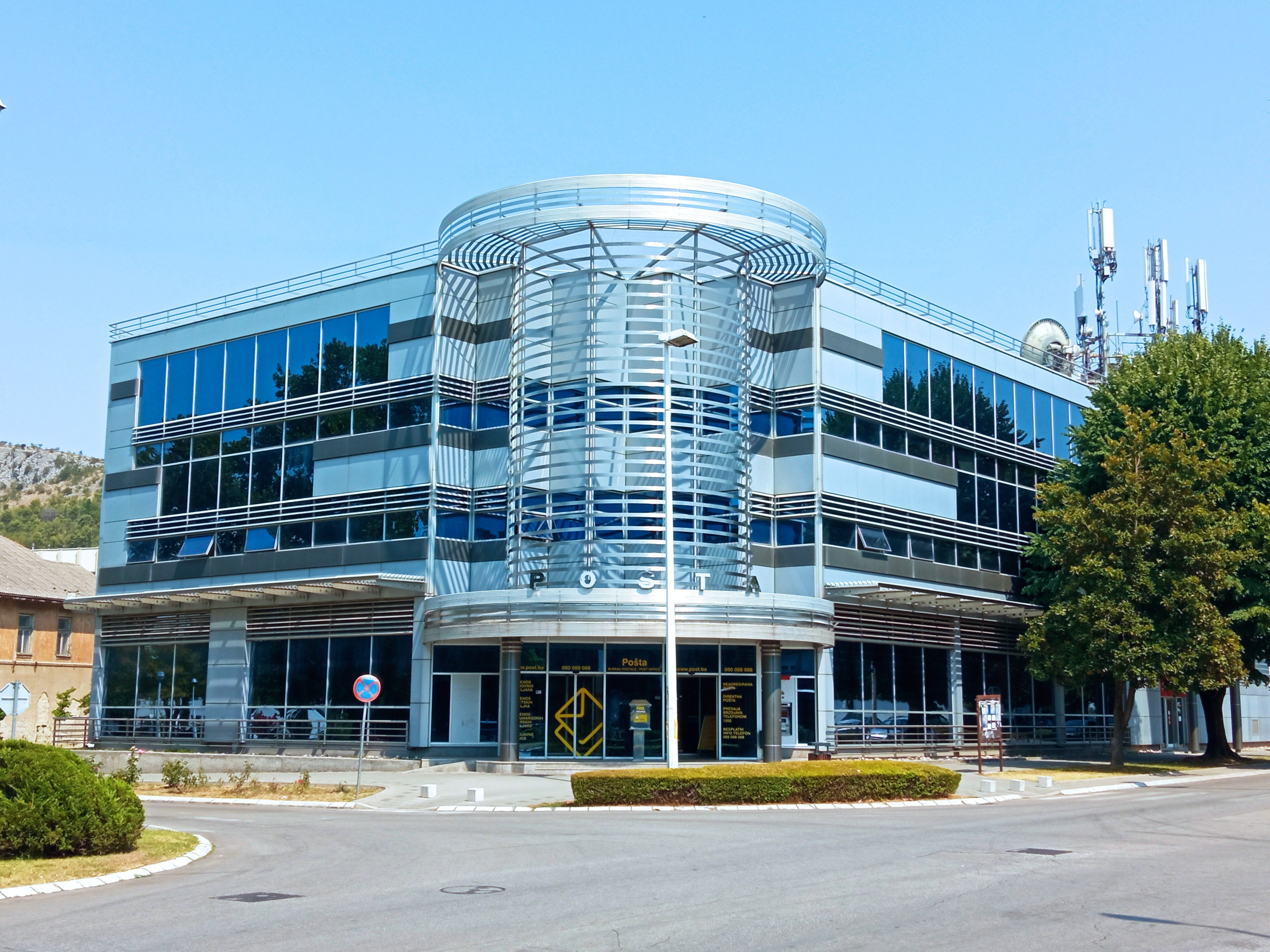
The postal office.

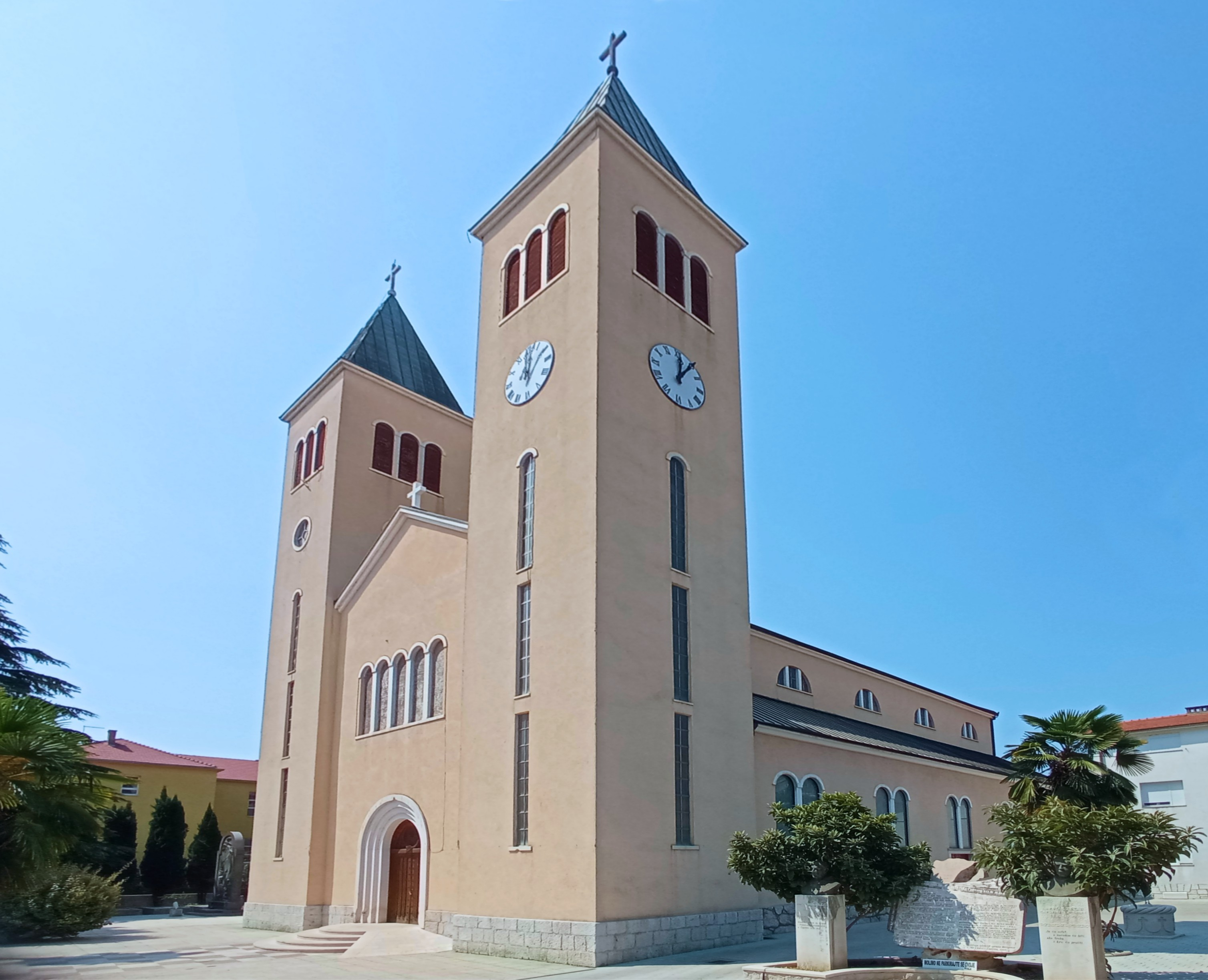
The Catholic church Saint Francis in the centre of the town (usurped by ex-franciscans).

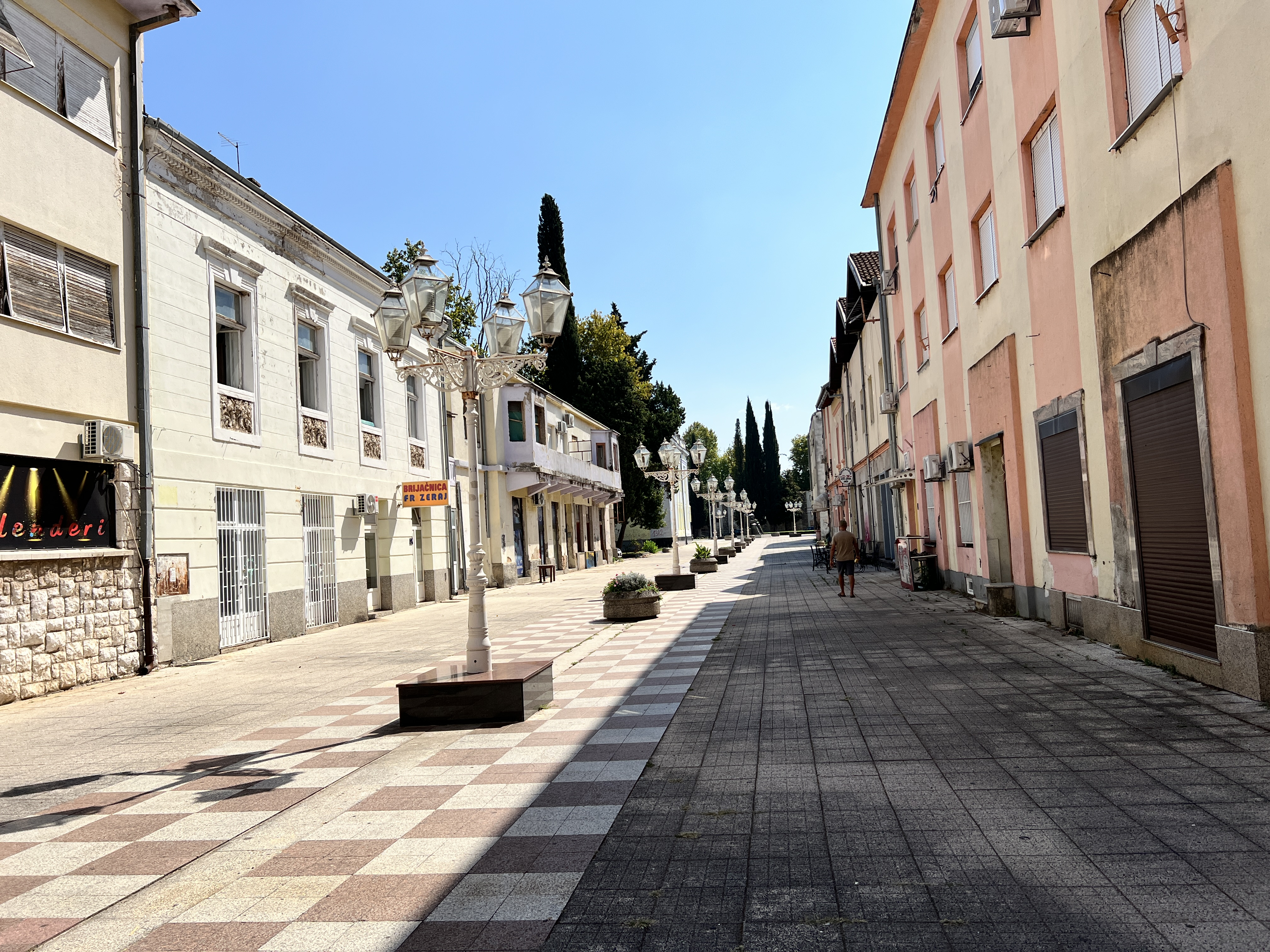
Matije Gupca Street in the centre of Čapljina in 2024.

Population of settlements – Čapljina municipality
	Settlement	1948.	1953.	1961.	1971.	1981.	1991.	2013.
	Total	22,086	24,364	25,543	28,240	26,032	27,882	28,122
1	Bivolje Brdo						841	1,026
2	Čapljina				4,647	6,191	7,461	6,340
3	Čeljevo						1,058	1,256
4	Doljani						365	495
5	Domanovići						1,270	1,493
6	Dračevo						630	556
7	Dretelj						576	569
8	Gabela						2,440	2,315
9	Gnjilišta						345	315
10	Gorica						456	442
11	Grabovina						947	960
12	Hotanj						275	451
13	Lokve						587	861
14	Opličići						1,386	1,268
15	Počitelj						905	799
16	Prćavci						260	255
17	Ševaš Njive						262	243
18	Struge						437	433
19	Šurmanci						403	301
20	Svitava						319	239
21	Tasovčići						1,675	1,950
22	Trebižat						1,399	1,272
23	Višići						1,788	1,765
24	Zvirovići						440	373

=== Ethnic composition ===
Ethnic composition – Čapljina town
	2013.	1991.	1981.	1971.
Total	6,340 (100,0%)	7,461 (100,0%)	6,191 (100,0%)	4,647 (100,0%)
Croats	4,724 (81,82%)	3,067 (41,11%)	2,542 (41,06%)	1,854 (39,90%)
Bosniaks	687 (11,90%)	2,191 (29,37%)	1,661 (26,83%)	1,605 (34,54%)
Others	187 (3,239%)	229 (3,069%)	46 (0,743%)	40 (0,861%)
Serbs	176 (3,048%)	1 267 (16,98%)	896 (14,47%)	945 (20,34%)
Yugoslavs		707 (9,476%)	955 (15,43%)	125 (2,690%)
Albanians			35 (0,565%)	20 (0,430%)
Montenegrins			31 (0,501%)	36 (0,775%)
Macedonians			16 (0,258%)	11 (0,237%)
Slovenes			9 (0,145%)	11 (0,237%)

Ethnic composition – Čapljina municipality
	2013.	1991.	1981.	1971.	1961.	1953.	1948.
Total	28,122 (100,0%)	27,882 (100,0%)	26,032 (100,0%)	28,240 (100,0%)	25,543 (100,0%)	24,364 (100,0%)	22,086 (100,0%)
Croats	20,538 (78,52%)	14,969 (53,69%)	13,931 (53,51%)	16,884 (59,79%)	15,444 (60,46%)	17,072 (70,07%)	15,699 (71,08%)
Bosniaks	4,541 (17,36%)	7,672 (27,52%)	6,830 (26,24%)	6,999 (24,78%)	5,630 (22,04%)		
Serbs	714 (2,730%)	3,753 (13,46%)	3,467 (13,32%)	3,896 (13,80%)	4,076 (15,96%)	3,355 (13,77%)	2,670 (12,09%)
Others	364 (1,392%)	441 (1,582%)	87 (0,334%)	113 (0,400%)	393 (1,54%)	3,937 (16,16%)	3,717 (16,83%)
Yugoslavs		1 047 (3,755%)	1 591 (6,112%)	206 (0,729%)			
Montenegrins			49 (0,188%)	79 (0,280%)			
Albanians			42 (0,161%)	25 (0,089%)			
Macedonians			23 (0,088%)	16 (0,057%)			
Slovenes			12 (0,046%)	18 (0,064%)			
Roma				4 (0,014%)			

Ethnic composition (1991) – Čapljina municipality by settlements
	Settlement	Total	Croats	Muslims	Serbs	Yugoslavs	Others
	total	27,882	14,969	7,672	3,753	1,047	441
1	Bajovci	181	176	5	0	0	0
2	Bivolje Brdo	841	256	562	4	6	13
3	Crnići	50	50	0	0	0	0
4	Čapljina	7,461	3,067	2,191	1,267	707	229
5	Čeljevo	1,058	827	194	1	8	28
6	Doljani	365	357	0	5	0	3
7	Domanovići	1,270	326	727	186	21	10
8	Dračevo	630	582	0	41	0	7
9	Dretelj	576	508	53	3	11	1
10	Dubravica	7	1	3	3	0	0
11	Gabela	2,440	2,046	32	324	24	14
12	Gnjilišta	345	338	1	0	0	6
13	Gorica	456	380	65	1	4	6
14	Grabovina	947	817	29	57	29	15
15	Hotanj	275	178	93	0	4	0
16	Jasenica	165	1	157	0	0	7
17	Klepci	417	14	0	383	13	7
18	Lokve	587	0	395	192	0	0
19	Opličići	1,386	108	916	357	0	5
20	Počitelj	905	172	660	20	36	17
21	Prćavci	260	260	0	0	0	0
22	Prebilovci	174	1	0	171	0	2
23	Sjekose	169	146	10	12	0	1
24	Stanojevići	194	31	163	0	0	0
25	Struge	437	284	130	2	16	5
26	Svitava	319	317	0	0	0	2
27	Ševaš Njive	262	69	191	0	2	0
28	Šurmanci	403	354	47	0	2	0
29	Tasovčići	1,675	294	511	698	138	34
30	Trebižat	1,399	1,371	9	1	11	7
31	Višići	1,788	1,207	528	23	15	15
32	Zvirovići	440	431	0	2	0	7

== Culture ==
In the Čapljina area, cultural associations include the following:

- HKUD Čapljina
- HKUD Višići (Višići)
- HKUD Luke (Višići)
- HKUD Sveti Ante (Dretelj)
- HKUD Seljačka Sloga (Trebižat)
- HKUD "Zora" Struge-Gorica
- KUD "Kolo Dubravsko" (Bivolje Brdo)

== Notable residents ==
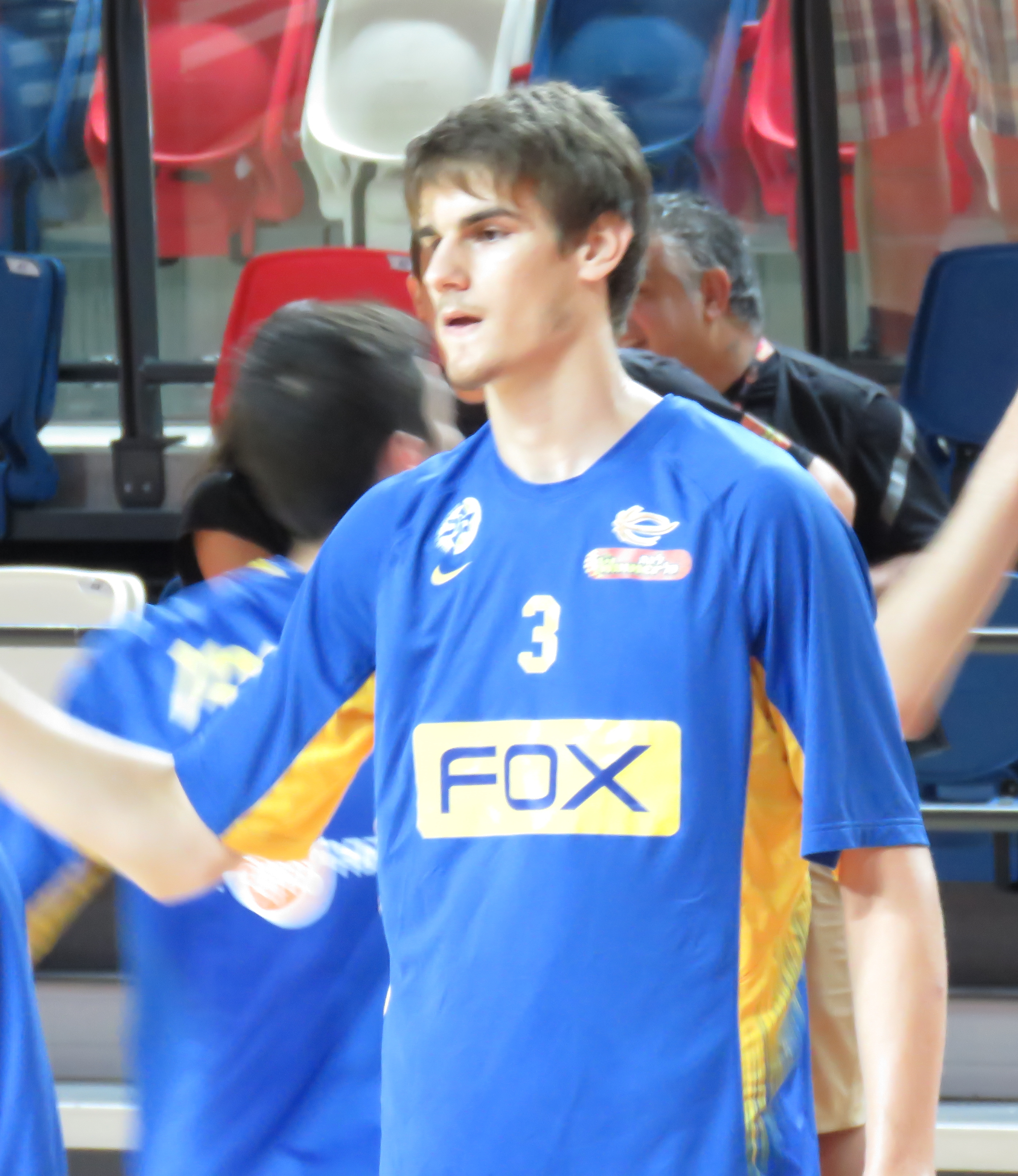
Dragan Bender

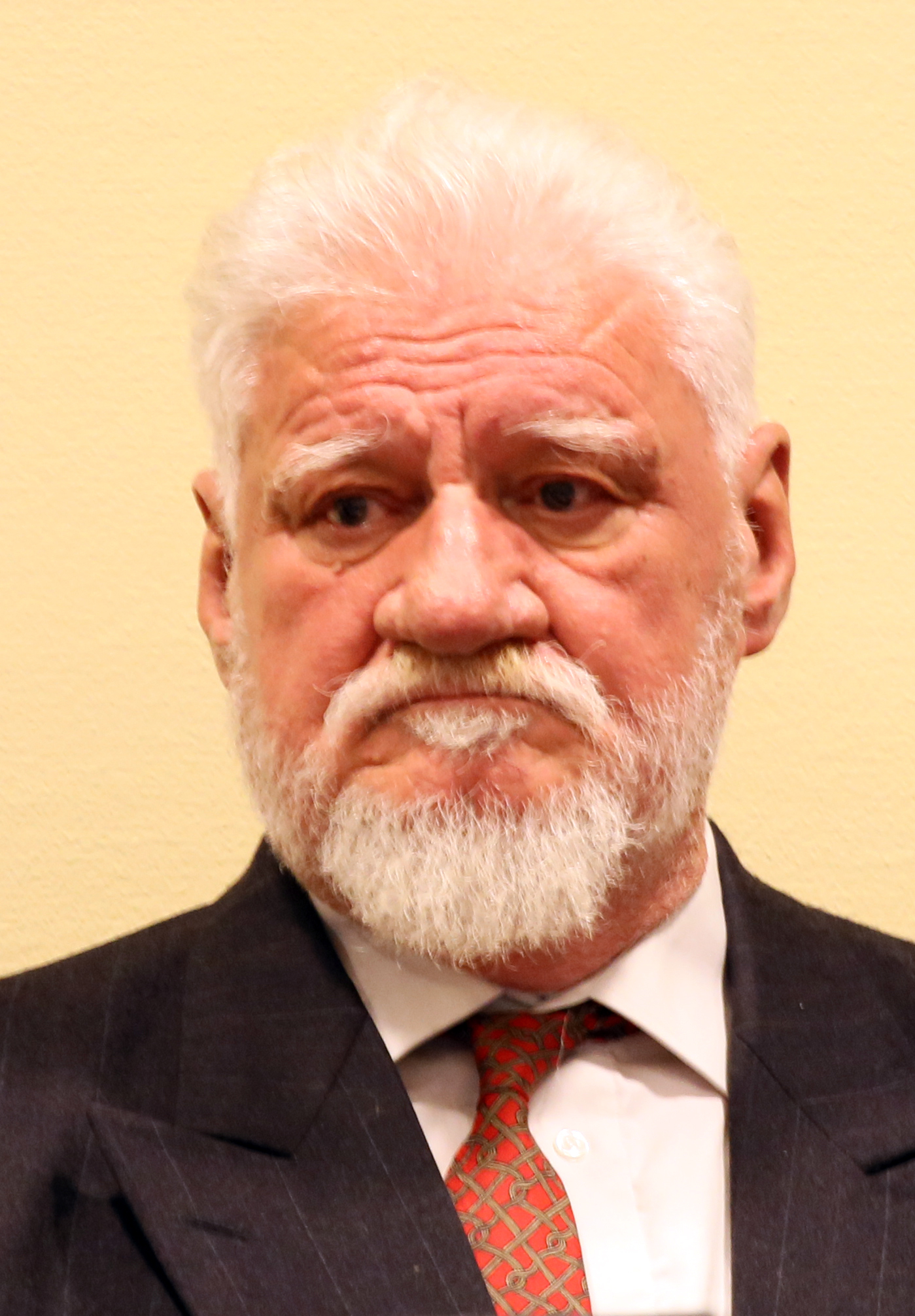
Slobodan Praljak

- Dejan Aćimović (born 1963), Croatian actor
- Dragan Bender (born 1997), Croatian basketball player in the Israeli Basketball Premier League
- Milorad Ekmečić (1928–2015), Serbian historian
- Mirsad Fazlagić (born 1943), retired Yugoslav footballer
- Nikica Jelavić (born 1985), Croatian footballer
- Vukašin Mandrapa (? - 1943), Serbian Orthodox saint
- Semjon Milošević (born 1979), retired footballer
- Slobodan Praljak (1945–2017), Croatian general, politician, war criminal and writer
- Admir Salihović (born 1988), Bosnian footballer
- Ivo Prskalo (born 1948), retired Yugoslav and Australian footballer
- Dada Vujasinović (1964–1994), Serbian journalist and news reporter
- Jasmin Repeša (born 1961), Croatian basketball coach
- Pamela Ramljak (born 1979), Croatian singer
- Marko Vego (1907–1985), Yugoslav archeologist, epigrapher and historian
- Nikola Prce (born 1980), Bosnian handball player
- Josip Šutalo (born 2000), Croatian football player

== Sports ==
- HNK Čapljina (football)
- GOŠK Gabela (football)
- HKK Čapljina Lasta (basketball)

== Twin towns – sister cities ==
Čapljina is twinned with:

- Koprivnica, Croatia
- Požega, Croatia
- Vrhnika, Slovenia
