= Bajovci =

- Village
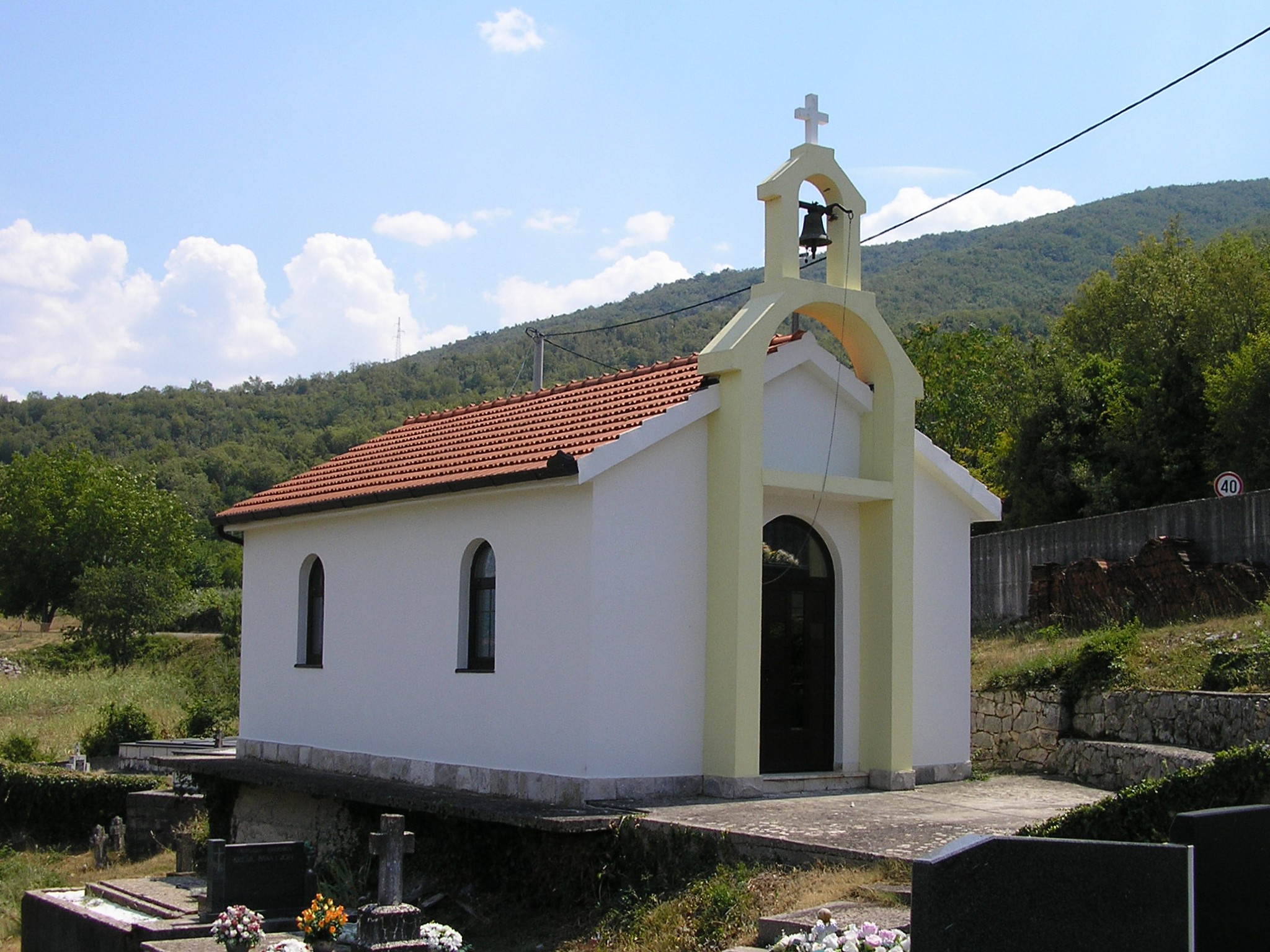
- St. John the Baptist's chapel in Bajovci

- Location within Bosnia and Herzegovina
- Coordinates: 43°01′N 17°46′E
- Country: Bosnia and Herzegovina
- Entity: Federation of Bosnia and Herzegovina
- Canton: Herzegovina-Neretva
- Municipality: Čapljina

Area
  - Total: 4.04 sq mi (10.46 km^{2})

Population (2013)
  - Total: 124
  - Density: 30.7/sq mi (11.9/km^{2})
- Time zone: UTC+1 (CET)
  - Summer (DST): UTC+2 (CEST)

Bajovci is a village in Čapljina municipality, Federation of Bosnia and Herzegovina, Bosnia and Herzegovina.

== Demographics ==
=== Ethnic composition, 1991 census ===
total: 181

- Croats - 176 (97.23%)
- Muslims - 5 (2.76%)

According to the 2013 census, its population was 124, all Croats.
