= Višići =

- Village
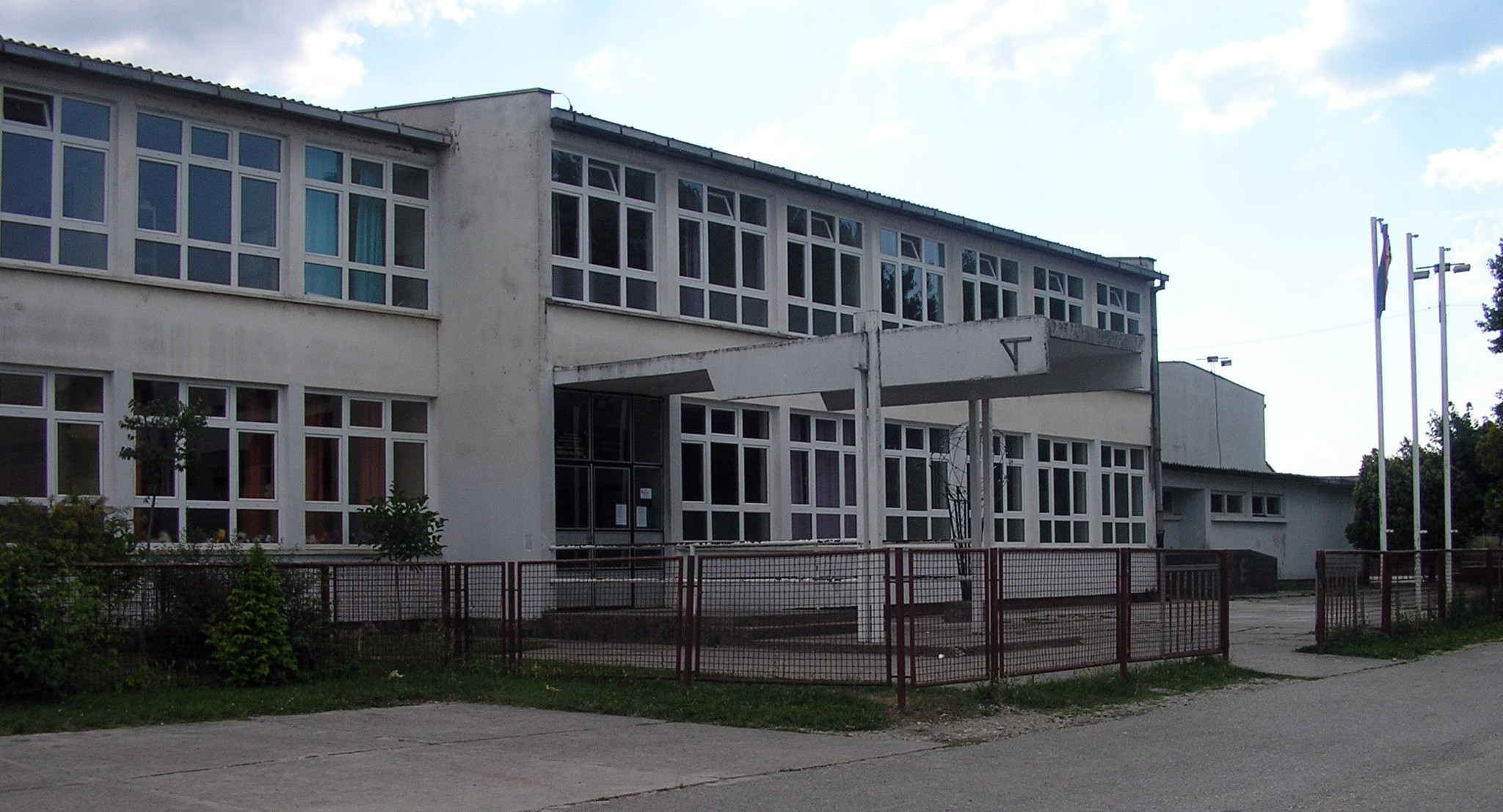
- Primary school

- Location within Bosnia and Herzegovina
- Country: Bosnia and Herzegovina
- Entity: Federation of Bosnia and Herzegovina
- Canton: Herzegovina-Neretva
- Municipality: Čapljina

Area
  - Total: 9.39 sq mi (24.32 km^{2})

Population (2013)
  - Total: 1,765
  - Density: 188.0/sq mi (72.57/km^{2})
- Time zone: UTC+1 (CET)
  - Summer (DST): UTC+2 (CEST)

Višići is a village in Bosnia and Herzegovina. According to the 1991 census, the village is located in the municipality of Čapljina.

== Demographics ==
According to the 2013 census, its population was 1,765.

Ethnicity in 2013
Ethnicity	Number	Percentage
Croats	1,329	75.3%
Bosniaks	406	23.0%
Serbs	12	0.7%
other/undeclared	18	1.1%
Total	1,765	100%
