= Sjekose =

- Village
- Location within Bosnia and Herzegovina
- Coordinates: 43°02′N 17°44′E
- Country: Bosnia and Herzegovina
- Entity: Federation of Bosnia and Herzegovina
- Canton: Herzegovina-Neretva
- Municipality: Čapljina

Area
  - Total: 5.15 sq mi (13.35 km^{2})

Population (2013)
  - Total: 187
  - Density: 36.3/sq mi (14.0/km^{2})
- Time zone: UTC+1 (CET)
  - Summer (DST): UTC+2 (CEST)

Sjekose is a village in Bosnia and Herzegovina. According to the 1991 census, the village is located in the municipality of Čapljina.

== Demographics ==
According to the 2013 census, its population was 187, all Croats.

== Historical Landmark ==
The village is home to a bridge, Štangerova ćuprija (Štanger Bridge), designed by Gustave Eiffel, architect of the Eiffel Tower in Paris.
