= Hotanj =

- Village
- Location within Bosnia and Herzegovina
- Country: Bosnia and Herzegovina
- Entity: Federation of Bosnia and Herzegovina
- Canton: Herzegovina-Neretva
- Municipality: Čapljina

Area
  - Total: 1.78 sq mi (4.61 km^{2})

Population (2013)
  - Total: 451
  - Density: 253/sq mi (97.8/km^{2})
- Time zone: UTC+1 (CET)
  - Summer (DST): UTC+2 (CEST)

Hotanj is a village in Bosnia and Herzegovina. According to the 1991 census, the village is located in the municipality of Čapljina.

== Demographics ==
According to the 2013 census, its population was 451.

Ethnicity in 2013
Ethnicity	Number	Percentage
Croats	388	86.0%
Bosniaks	58	12.9%
other/undeclared	5	1.1%
Total	451	100%
