= Zvirovići =

- Village
- Location within Bosnia and Herzegovina
- Coordinates: 43°10′N 17°40′E
- Country: Bosnia and Herzegovina
- Entity: Federation of Bosnia and Herzegovina
- Canton: Herzegovina-Neretva
- Municipality: Čapljina

Area
  - Total: 3.59 sq mi (9.31 km^{2})

Population (2013)
  - Total: 373
  - Density: 104/sq mi (40.1/km^{2})
- Time zone: UTC+1 (CET)
  - Summer (DST): UTC+2 (CEST)

Zvirovići is a village in Bosnia and Herzegovina. According to the 1991 census, the village is located in the municipality of Čapljina.

== Demographics ==
According to the 2013 census, its population was 373.

Ethnicity in 2013
| Ethnicity | Number | Percentage |
|---|---|---|
| Croats | 370 | 99.2% |
| other/undeclared | 3 | 0.8% |
| Total | 373 | 100% |

== Bibliography ==
=== Toponymy ===
- Vidović, Domagoj (2011). "Toponimija sela Zvirovići". Župa Studenci u Hercegovini. Mostar: Crkva na kamenu. pp. 47–57. ISBN 978-9958-1918-1-7. Archived from the original on 2025-04-26.
