= Čeljevo =

- Village
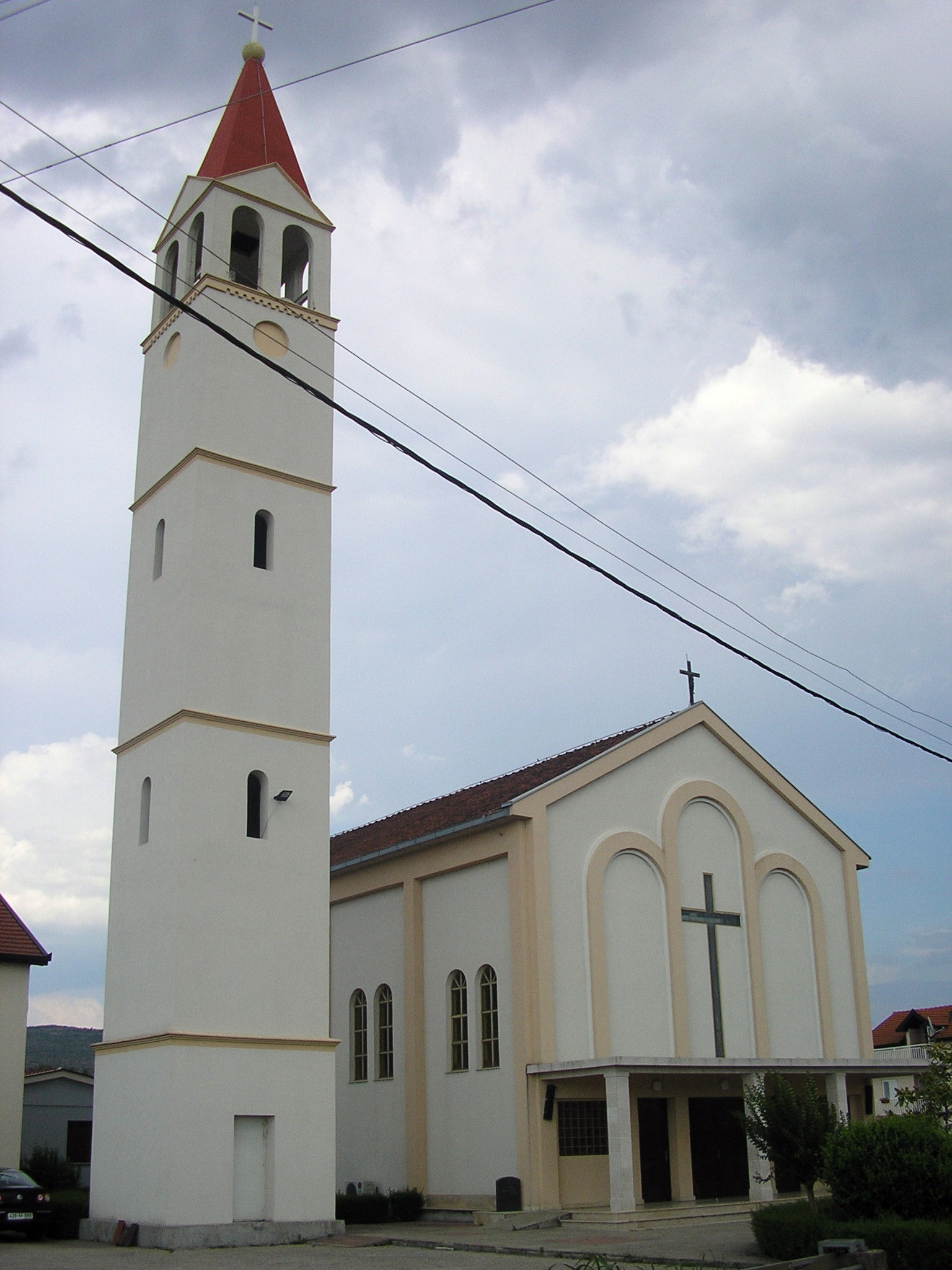

- Location within Bosnia and Herzegovina
- Country: Bosnia and Herzegovina
- Entity: Federation of Bosnia and Herzegovina
- Canton: Herzegovina-Neretva
- Municipality: Čapljina

Area
  - Total: 1.67 sq mi (4.32 km^{2})

Population (2013)
  - Total: 1,256
  - Density: 753/sq mi (291/km^{2})
- Time zone: UTC+1 (CET)
  - Summer (DST): UTC+2 (CEST)

Čeljevo is a village in Bosnia and Herzegovina. According to the 1991 census, the village is located in the municipality of Čapljina.

== Demographics ==
According to the 2013 census, its population was 1,256.

Ethnicity in 2013
Ethnicity	Number	Percentage
Croats	1,095	87.2%
Bosniaks	149	11.9%
Serbs	3	0.2%
other/undeclared	9	0.7%
Total	1,256	100%
