= Gnjilišta =

- Village
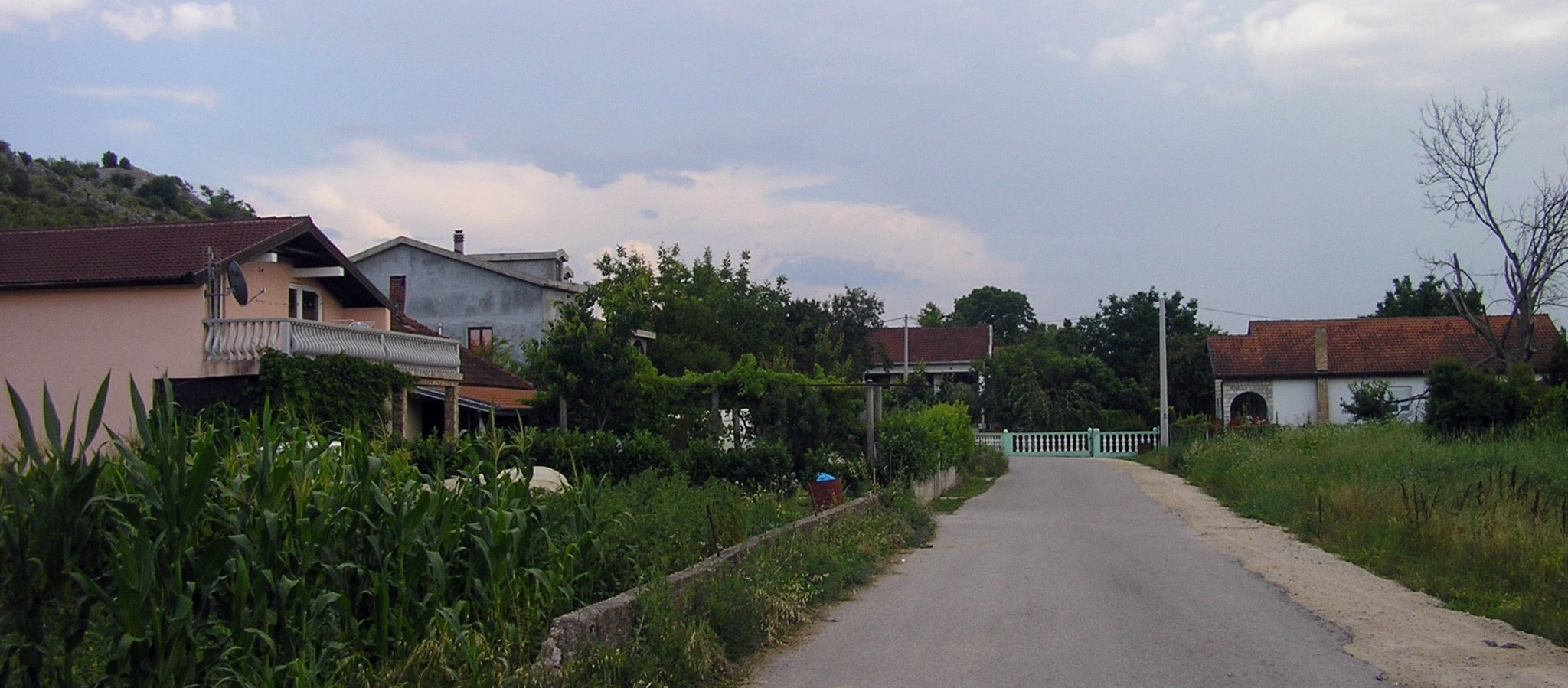

- Location within Bosnia and Herzegovina
- Coordinates: 43°05′N 17°44′E
- Country: Bosnia and Herzegovina
- Entity: Federation of Bosnia and Herzegovina
- Canton: Herzegovina-Neretva
- Municipality: Čapljina

Area
  - Total: 1.18 sq mi (3.05 km^{2})

Population (2013)
  - Total: 315
  - Density: 267/sq mi (103/km^{2})
- Time zone: UTC+1 (CET)
  - Summer (DST): UTC+2 (CEST)

Gnjilišta is a village in Bosnia and Herzegovina. According to the 1991 census, the village is located in the municipality of Čapljina.

== Demographics ==
According to the 2013 census, its population was 315.

Ethnicity in 2013
Ethnicity	Number	Percentage
Croats	314	99.7%
Bosniaks	1	0.3%
Total	315	100%
