= Vukašin Mandrapa =

Serbian Orthodox saint

Saint Vukašin
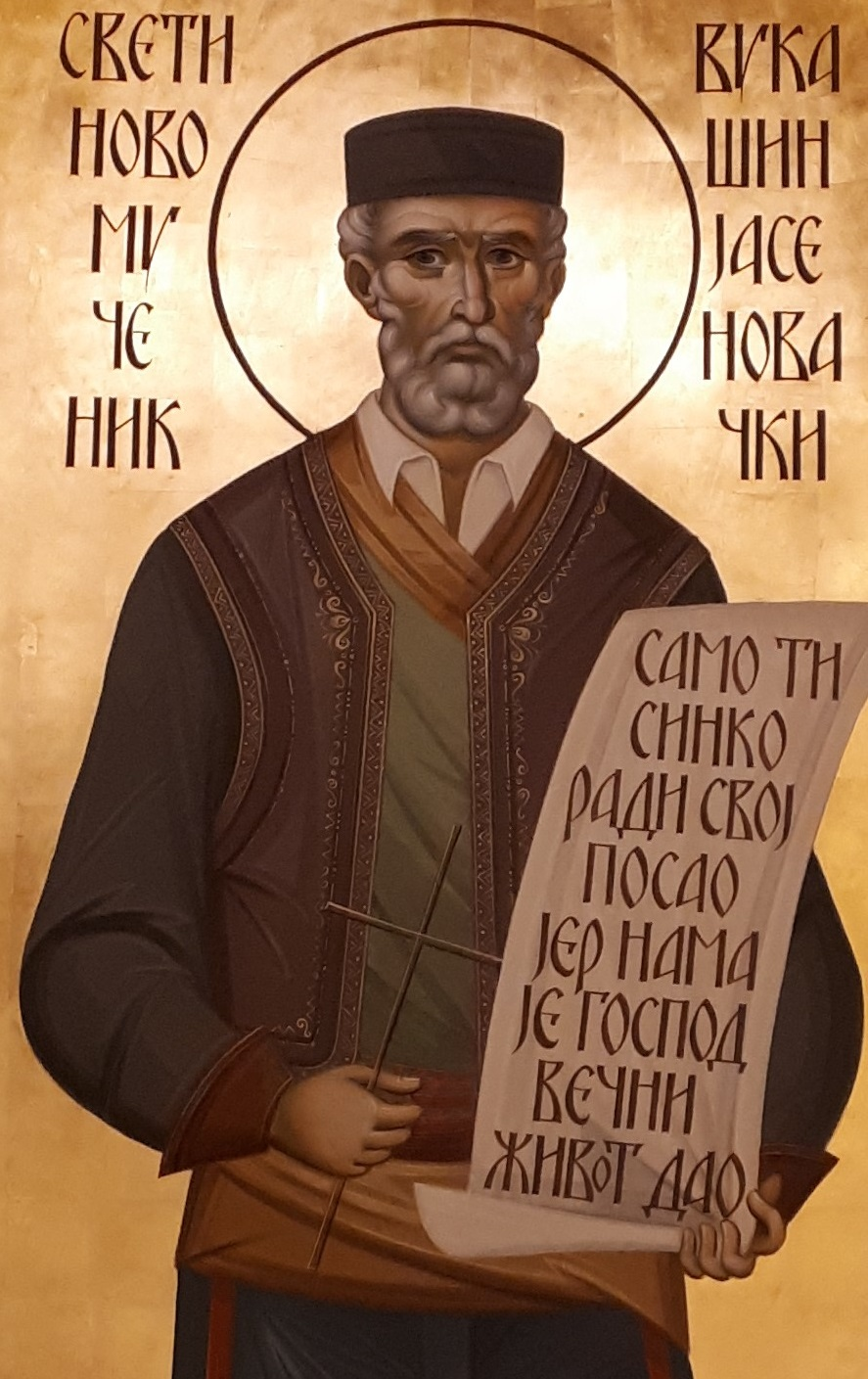
- Fresco of Saint Vukašin in the Temple of Saint Sava in Belgrade

New Martyr
- Died: 1942/1943; Jasenovac, Independent State of Croatia
- Venerated in: Eastern Orthodox Church
- Canonized: 1998 by the Holy Synod of the Serbian Orthodox Church
- Feast: 29 May [O.S. 16 May] 13 October [O.S. 31 August] (Synaxis of the Holy Martyrs of Jasenovac)
- Attributes: depicted as an old layman, wearing traditional Serbian clothing and a Montenegrin cap, holding a scroll, martyr's cross and/or his own head; missing his limbs and appendages during his martyrdom

Vukašin Mandrapa (Serbian Cyrillic: Вукашин Мандрапа; died 1942 or 1943), also known as Vukašin of Klepci (Serbian: Вукашин Клепачки, romanized: Vukašin Klepački) is venerated as a Serbian Orthodox saint who was allegedly murdered in the Jasenovac concentration camp. His historical existence is disputed due to a lack of evidence. The sole source for his existence is the account of Nedo Zec, a neurologist who was a prisoner at the camp.

== Dispute over existence ==
The sole account of his life and martyrdom originates from Nedo Zec, a neuropsychiatrist who was a "free prisoner" in the Jasenovac concentration camp. Zec recounted a testimony an Ustaša executioner made to him in January 1943, claiming that he had murdered Mandrapa.

According to one version of events, Mandrapa was a farmer and merchant from Klepci, living in Sarajevo. Other sources claim his surname was Toholj and that he was from Lokve. The year of his death is also disputed, with sources citing either 1942 or 1943.

Historian Ivo Rendić-Miočević argues that there is no historical evidence for Mandrapa's existence. The philosopher Aleksandar Pražić argues that Zec's account is fictional.

== Alleged martyrdom ==
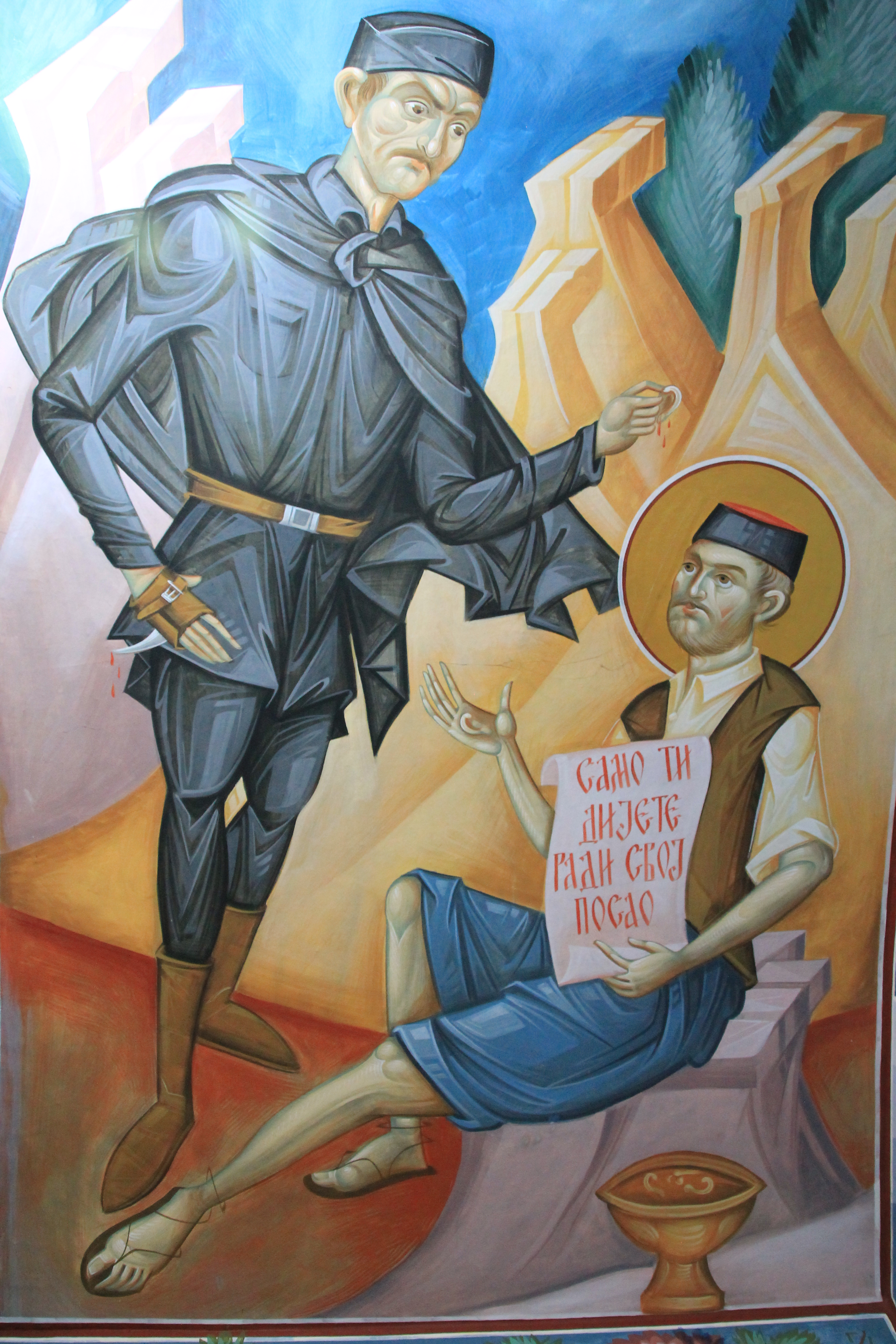
A fresco depicting the martyrdom of Saint Vukašin

According to Zec's testimony from 1970, Mandrapa was singled out by an Ustaša executioner, allegedly named Friganović (Josip or Mile), due to his stoic behavior during forced labour and mass executions. Friganović allegedly attempted to compel Mandrapa to bless the Ustaše leader Ante Pavelić. Mandrapa refused to do so, even after Friganović had allegedly cut off both his ears and nose after each refusal. After ordering him to shout "Long live Pavelić!" for a fourth time and threatening to take his heart out with a knife, Mandrapa looked at Friganović and calmly stated "Do your job child". Friganović then allegedly cut out Mandrapa's eyes, tore out his heart, and slit his throat.

Friganović told Zec that this was in the context of a killing contest he waged with Petar Brzica and other camp commanders, and boasted that by then he had slaughtered some 1,100 inmates. According to Zec, this act caused Friganović to break down psychologically, leading to his inability to continue killing that night and requiring psychiatric treatment.

== Legacy ==
He was canonized as a saint and neomartyr by the Serbian Orthodox Church in 1998, as Saint Vukašin of Klepci (Serbian: Свети Вукашин Клепачки, romanized: Sveti Vukašin Klepački). His feast day is commemorated on 29 May [O.S. 16 May], also being commemorated with the New Martyrs of Jasenovac on 13 October [O.S. 31 August].
