= Crnići, Čapljina =

Crnići
- Village
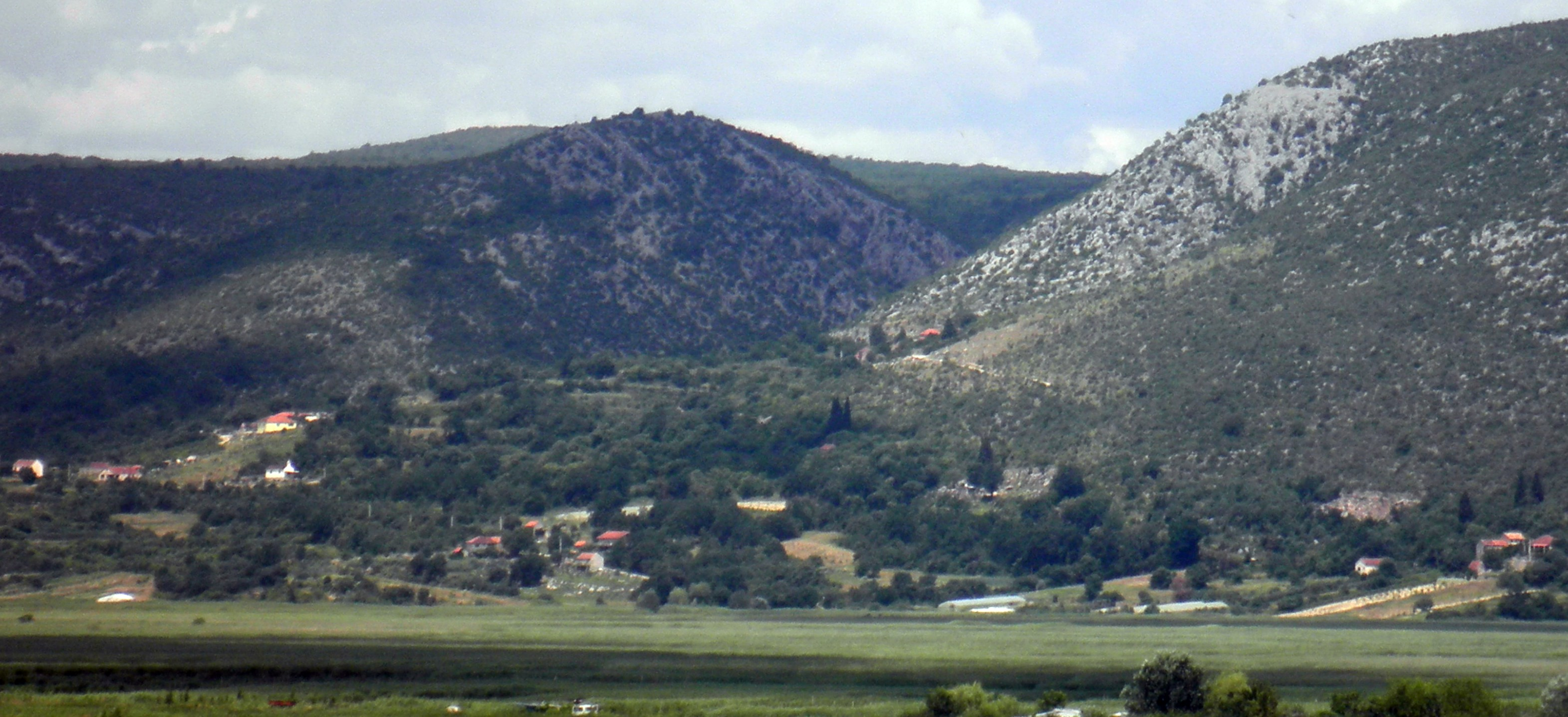

- Location within Bosnia and Herzegovina
- Coordinates: 43.0939°N 17.6356°E
- Country: Bosnia and Herzegovina
- Entity: Federation of Bosnia and Herzegovina
- Canton: Herzegovina-Neretva
- Municipality: Čapljina

Area
  - Total: 0.87 sq mi (2.26 km^{2})

Population (2013)
  - Total: 34
  - Density: 39/sq mi (15/km^{2})
- Time zone: UTC+1 (CET)
  - Summer (DST): UTC+2 (CEST)
- Postal code: 88300

Crnići is a village in Bosnia and Herzegovina. According to the 1991 census, the village is located in the municipality of Čapljina.

== Demographics ==
According to the 2013 census, its population was 34, all Croats.
