= Ševaš Njive =

- Village
- Location within Bosnia and Herzegovina
- Coordinates: 43°09′N 17°45′E
- Country: Bosnia and Herzegovina
- Entity: Federation of Bosnia and Herzegovina
- Canton: Herzegovina-Neretva
- Municipality: Čapljina

Area
  - Total: 1.03 sq mi (2.68 km^{2})

Population (2013)
  - Total: 243
  - Density: 235/sq mi (90.7/km^{2})
- Time zone: UTC+1 (CET)
  - Summer (DST): UTC+2 (CEST)

Ševaš Njive is a village in Bosnia and Herzegovina. According to the 1991 census, the village is located in the municipality of Čapljina.

== Demographics ==
According to the 2013 census, its population was 243.

Ethnicity in 2013
Ethnicity	Number	Percentage
Bosniaks	171	70.4%
Croats	72	29.6%
Total	243	100%
