= Tasovčići =

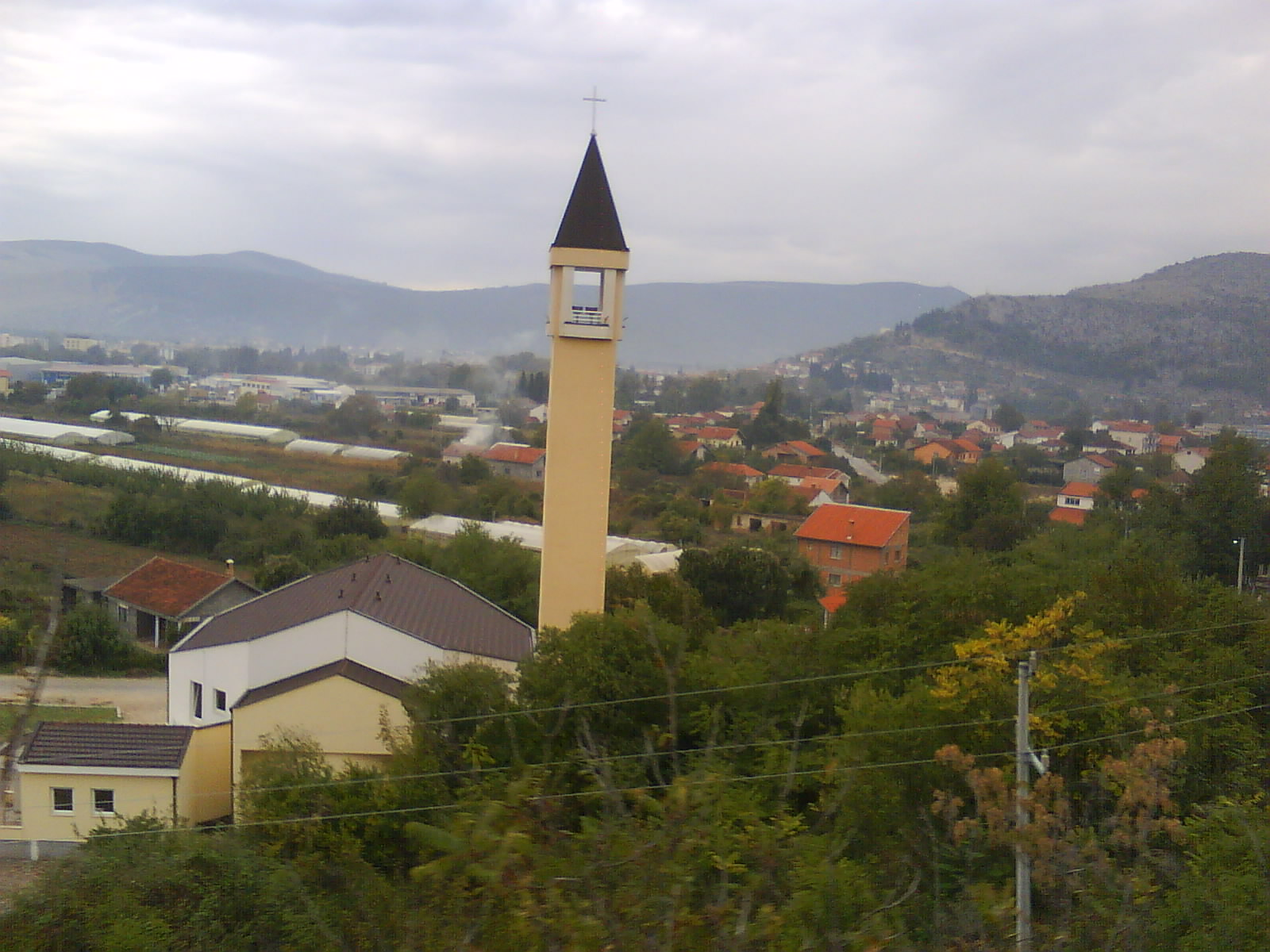
- View of Tasovčići with St. John the Baptist Roman Catholic church

- Location within Bosnia and Herzegovina
- Coordinates: 43°06′48″N 17°43′12″E
- Country: Bosnia and Herzegovina
- Entity: Federation of Bosnia and Herzegovina
- Canton: Herzegovina-Neretva
- Municipality: Čapljina

Area
  - Total: 3.10 sq mi (8.02 km^{2})

Population (2013)
  - Total: 1,950
  - Density: 630/sq mi (243/km^{2})
- Time zone: UTC+1 (CET)
  - Summer (DST): UTC+2 (CEST)

Tasovčići is a village in Bosnia and Herzegovina. According to the 1991 census, the village is located in the municipality of Čapljina.

== History ==
In the Roman period, there was a settlement called Latin: Ad Turres here. Originally belonging to the Manii tribe, it was on the road from Narona (modern Vid, Croatia) to Diluntum (modern Stolac, Bosnia and Hercegovina).

== Demographics ==
According to the 2013 census, its population was 1,950.

Ethnicity in 2013
Ethnicity	Number	Percentage
Croats	1,555	79.7%
Bosniaks	241	12.4%
Serbs	129	6.6%
other/undeclared	25	1.3%
Total	1,950	100%
