= Jasenica, Čapljina =

Jasenica
- Village
- Location within Bosnia and Herzegovina
- Country: Bosnia and Herzegovina
- Entity: Federation of Bosnia and Herzegovina
- Canton: Herzegovina-Neretva
- Municipality: Čapljina

Area
  - Total: 4.16 sq mi (10.77 km^{2})

Population (2013)
  - Total: 73
  - Density: 18/sq mi (6.8/km^{2})
- Time zone: UTC+1 (CET)
  - Summer (DST): UTC+2 (CEST)

Jasenica is a village in Bosnia and Herzegovina. According to the 1991 census, the village is located in the municipality of Čapljina.

== Demographics ==
According to the 2013 census, its population was 73.

Ethnicity in 2013
Ethnicity	Number	Percentage
Bosniaks	52	71.2%
Croats	1	1.4%
other/undeclared	20	27.4%
Total	73	100%
