= Klepci =

Village in Čapljina, Bosnia and Herzegovina

- Village
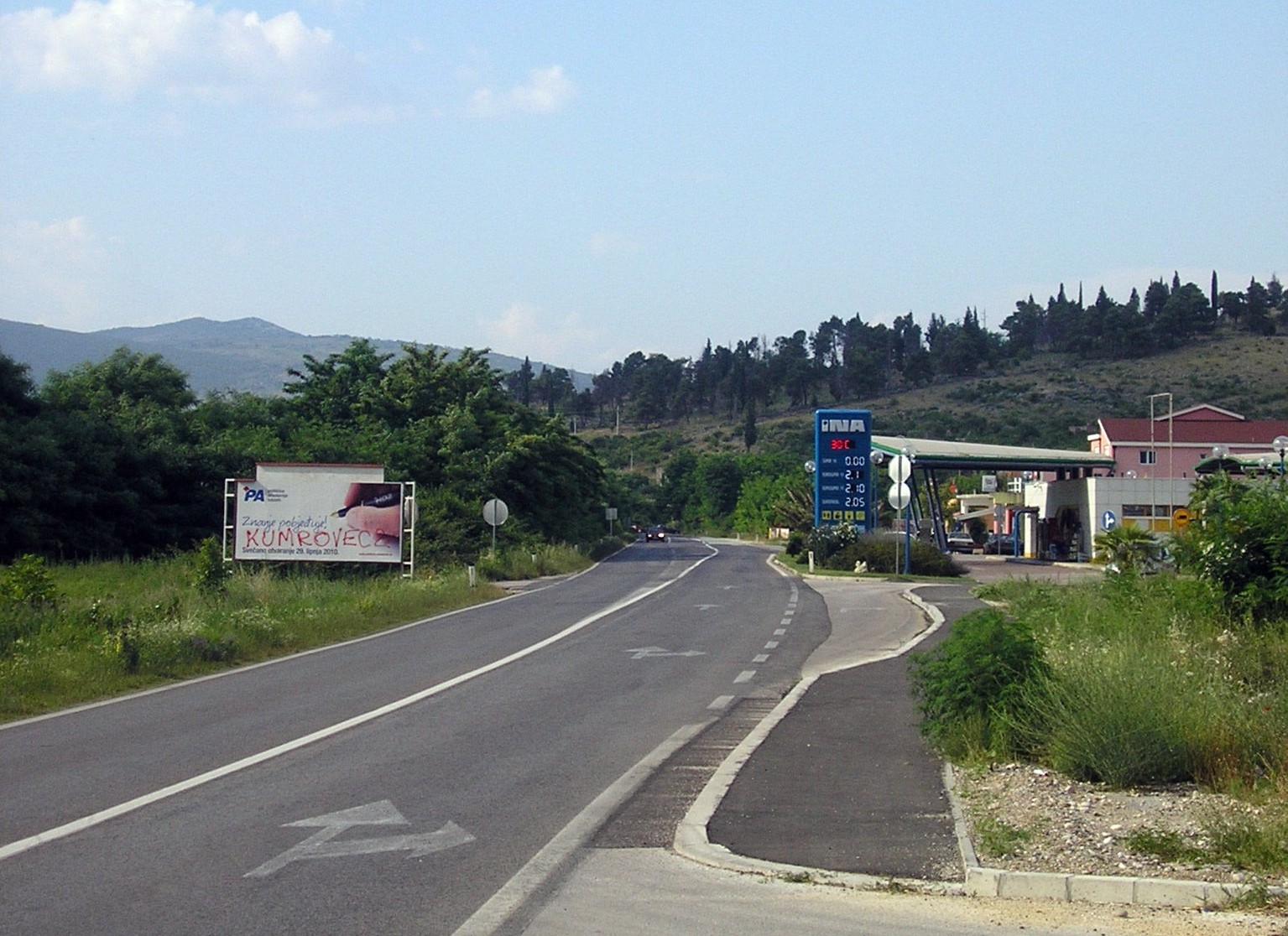

- Location within Bosnia and Herzegovina
- Coordinates: 43°06′N 17°43′E
- Country: Bosnia and Herzegovina
- Entity: Federation of Bosnia and Herzegovina
- Canton: Herzegovina-Neretva
- Municipality: Čapljina

Area
  - Total: 0.83 sq mi (2.16 km^{2})

Population (2013)
  - Total: 163
  - Density: 195/sq mi (75.5/km^{2})
- Time zone: UTC+1 (CET)
  - Summer (DST): UTC+2 (CEST)

Klepci is a village in Bosnia and Herzegovina. According to the 1991 census, the village is located in the municipality of Čapljina.

== Demographics ==
According to the 2013 census, its population was 163.

Ethnicity in 2013
Ethnicity	Number	Percentage
Croats	114	69.9%
Serbs	48	29.4%
other/undeclared	1	0.6%
Total	163	100%

== People ==
- Vukašin Mandrapa
