= Bivolje Brdo =

- Village
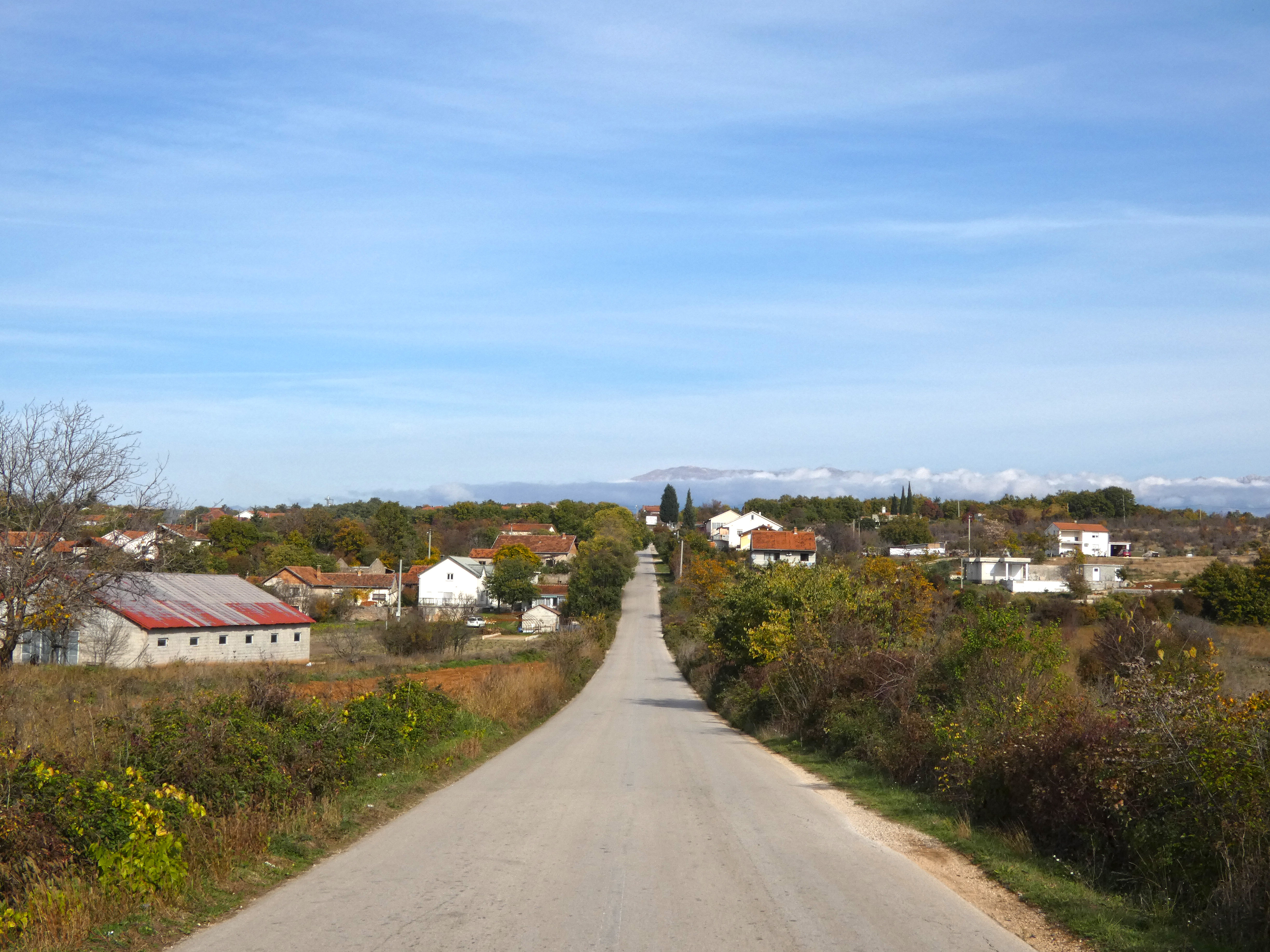

- Location within Bosnia and Herzegovina
- Coordinates: 43°09′N 17°47′E
- Country: Bosnia and Herzegovina
- Entity: Federation of Bosnia and Herzegovina
- Canton: Herzegovina-Neretva
- Municipality: Čapljina

Area
  - Total: 3.94 sq mi (10.21 km^{2})

Population (2013)
  - Total: 1,026
  - Density: 260.3/sq mi (100.5/km^{2})
- Time zone: UTC+1 (CET)
  - Summer (DST): UTC+2 (CEST)

Bivolje Brdo is a village in Čapljina municipality, Federation of Bosnia and Herzegovina, Bosnia and Herzegovina.

== Population ==
=== Ethnic composition ===
Total: 841

- Muslims - 562 (66.82%)
- Croats - 256 (30.43%)
- Yugoslavs - 6 (0.71%)
- Serbs - 4 (0.47%)
- others and unknown - 13 (1.54%)

Total: 1026 (2013)

- Muslims - 506 (49.06%)
- Croats - 509 (49.09%)
- Others - 11
