= Domanovići =

- Village
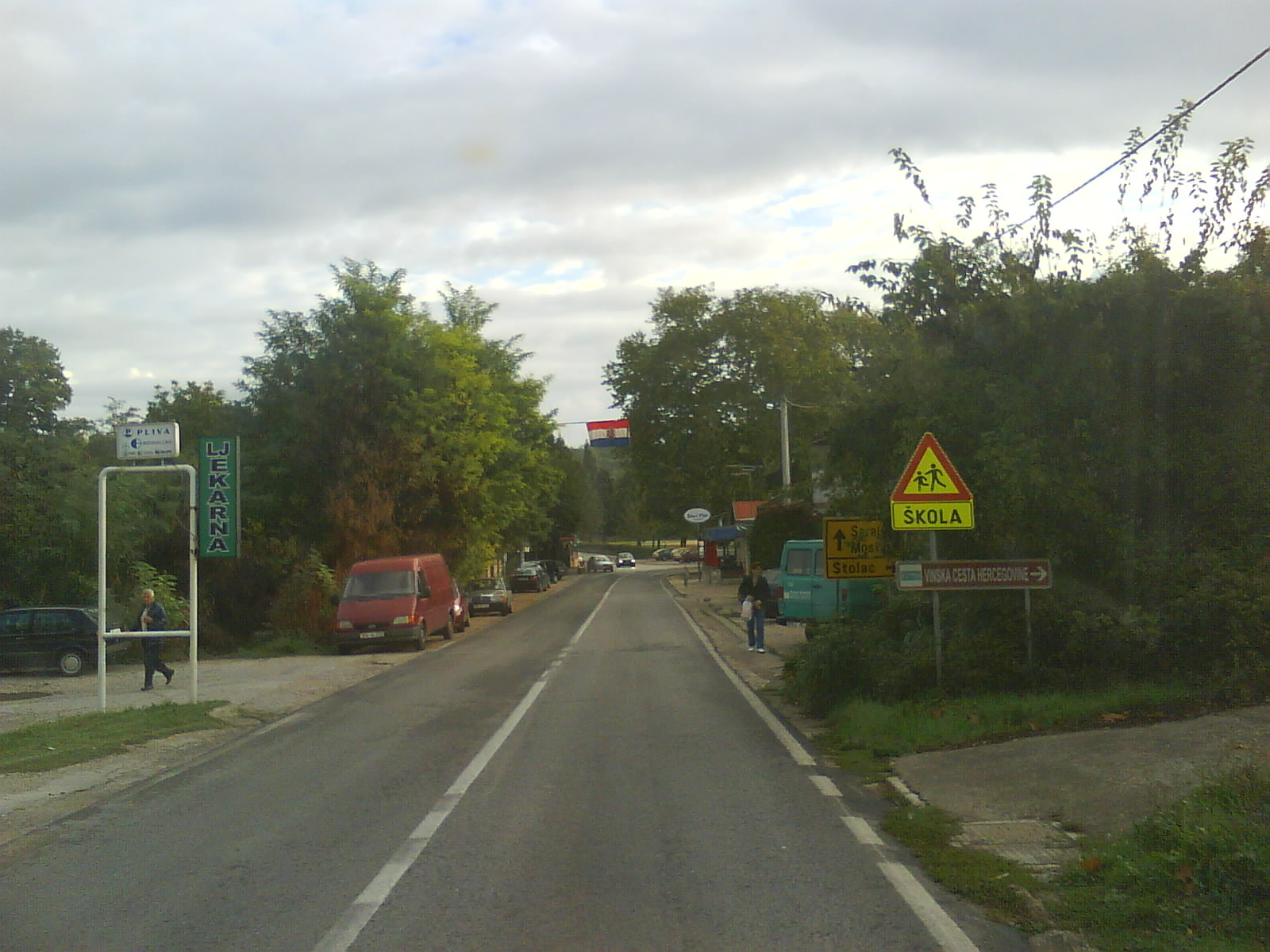

- Location within Bosnia and Herzegovina
- Coordinates: 43°08′N 17°47′E
- Country: Bosnia and Herzegovina
- Entity: Federation of Bosnia and Herzegovina
- Canton: Herzegovina-Neretva
- Municipality: Čapljina

Area
  - Total: 4.04 sq mi (10.46 km^{2})

Population (2013)
  - Total: 1,493
  - Density: 369.7/sq mi (142.7/km^{2})
- Time zone: UTC+1 (CET)
  - Summer (DST): UTC+2 (CEST)

Domanovići is a village in Bosnia and Herzegovina. According to the 1991 census, the village is located in the municipality of Čapljina.

== Demographics ==
According to the 2013 census, its population was 1,493.

Ethnicity in 2013
Ethnicity	Number	Percentage
Croats	895	59.9%
Bosniaks	570	38.2%
Serbs	16	1.1%
other/undeclared	12	0.8%
Total	1,493	100%
