= Lokve, Čapljina =

Lokve
- Village
- Location within Bosnia and Herzegovina
- Country: Bosnia and Herzegovina
- Entity: Federation of Bosnia and Herzegovina
- Canton: Herzegovina-Neretva
- Municipality: Čapljina

Area
  - Total: 4.20 sq mi (10.87 km^{2})

Population (2013)
  - Total: 861
  - Density: 205/sq mi (79.2/km^{2})
- Time zone: UTC+1 (CET)
  - Summer (DST): UTC+2 (CEST)

Lokve is a village in Bosnia and Herzegovina. According to the 1991 census, the village is located in the municipality of Čapljina.

== Demographics ==
According to the 2013 census, its population was 861.

Ethnicity in 2013
Ethnicity	Number	Percentage
Croats	532	61.8%
Bosniaks	244	28.3%
Serbs	84	9.8%
other/undeclared	1	0.1%
Total	861	100%
