= Brda =

Brda, which translates as hills from Serbo-Croatian, may refer to:

== Places ==
=== Bosnia and Herzegovina ===
- Brda, Bugojno, a village in the municipality of Bugojno
- Brda, Donji Vakuf, a village in the municipality of Donji Vakuf
- Brda, Drvar, a village in the municipality of Drvar
- Brda, Konjic, a village in the municipality of Kalinovik
- Brda, Kupres, a village in the municipality of Kupres
- Brda, Olovo, a village in the municipality of Olovo
- Brda (Rogatica), a village in the municipality of Rogatica
- Brda (Srebrenik), a village in the municipality of Srebrenik
- Brda (Trnovo), a village in the municipality of Trnovo
- Brda, Vareš, a village in the municipality of Vareš
- Brda, Velika Kladuša, a village in the municipality of Velika Kladuša
- Donja Brda, a village in the municipality of Goražde
- Gornja Brda, a village in the municipality of Goražde
- Lohovska Brda, a village in the municipality of Bihać
- Obla Brda, a village in the municipality of Trnovo

=== Montenegro ===
- Brda (Montenegro), a region
- Brda, Pljevlja, a village in Pljevlja Municipality

=== Poland ===
- Brda, Pomeranian Voivodeship, a village
- Nowa Brda, a settlement in the Pomeranian Voivodeship
- Stara Brda, a settlement in the Pomeranian Voivodeship

=== Slovenia ===
- Babna Brda, a settlement in the Municipality of Šmarje pri Jelšah
- Brda, Radovljica, a settlement in the Municipality of Radovljica
- Brda, Slovenj Gradec, a settlement the Municipality of Slovenj Gradec
- Dolga Brda, a settlement in the Municipality of Prevalje
- Krajna Brda, a settlement in the Municipality of Sevnica
- Mala Brda, a village in the Municipality of Postojna
- Municipality of Brda, a municipality in the Slovenian Littoral region
- Velika Brda, a village in the Municipality of Postojna

== Other uses ==
- Brda (river), a river in Poland
- Brda dialect, a Slovene dialect
- NK Brda, a Slovenian football club from Dobrovo
- Tribes of Brda, tribes from the region of Montenegro
- Zagajička Brda, hills in Serbia

== See also ==
- Burda (disambiguation)
