= Stećak to nišan transition =

Medieval burial culture of Bosnia and Herzegovina

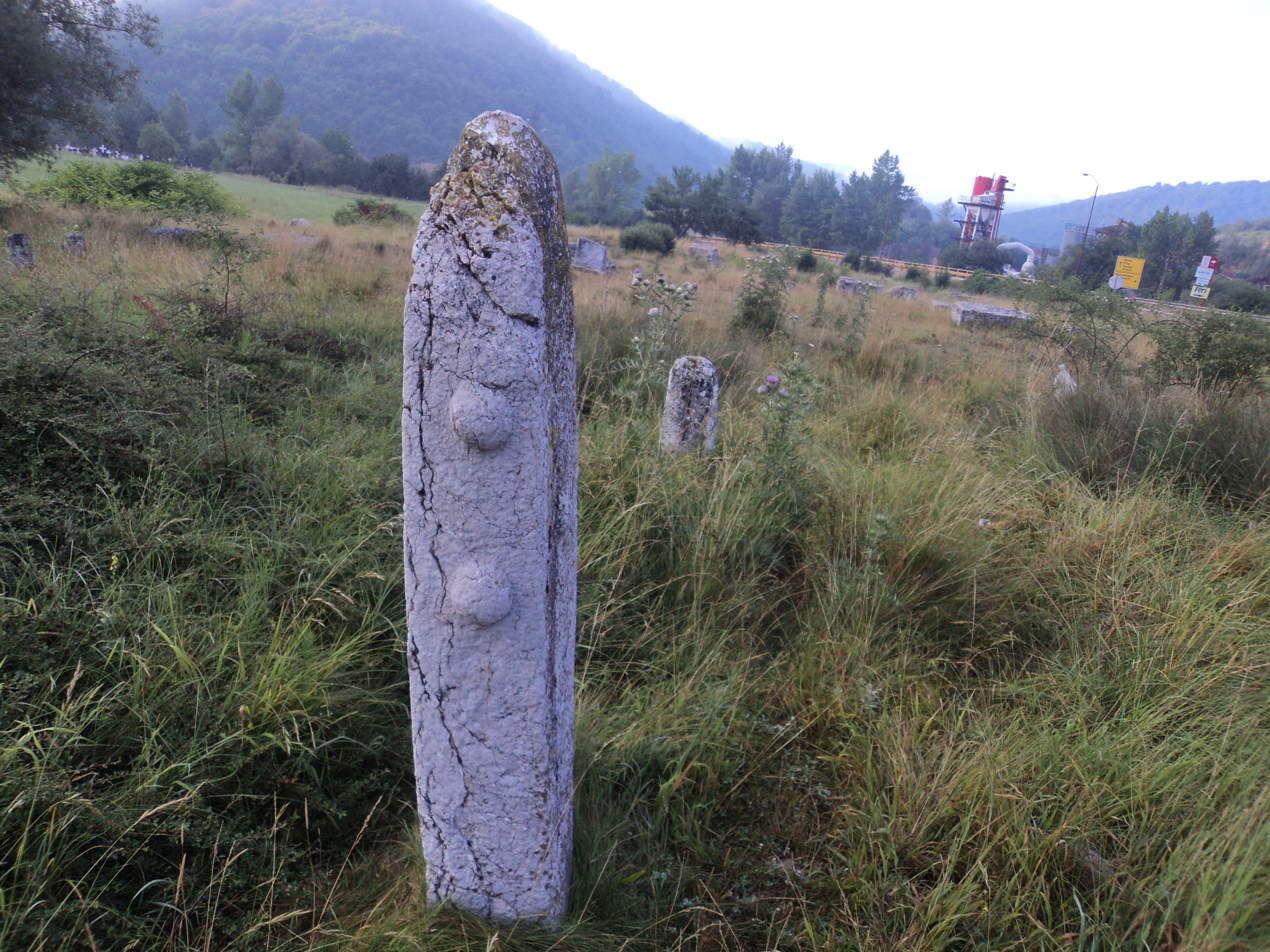
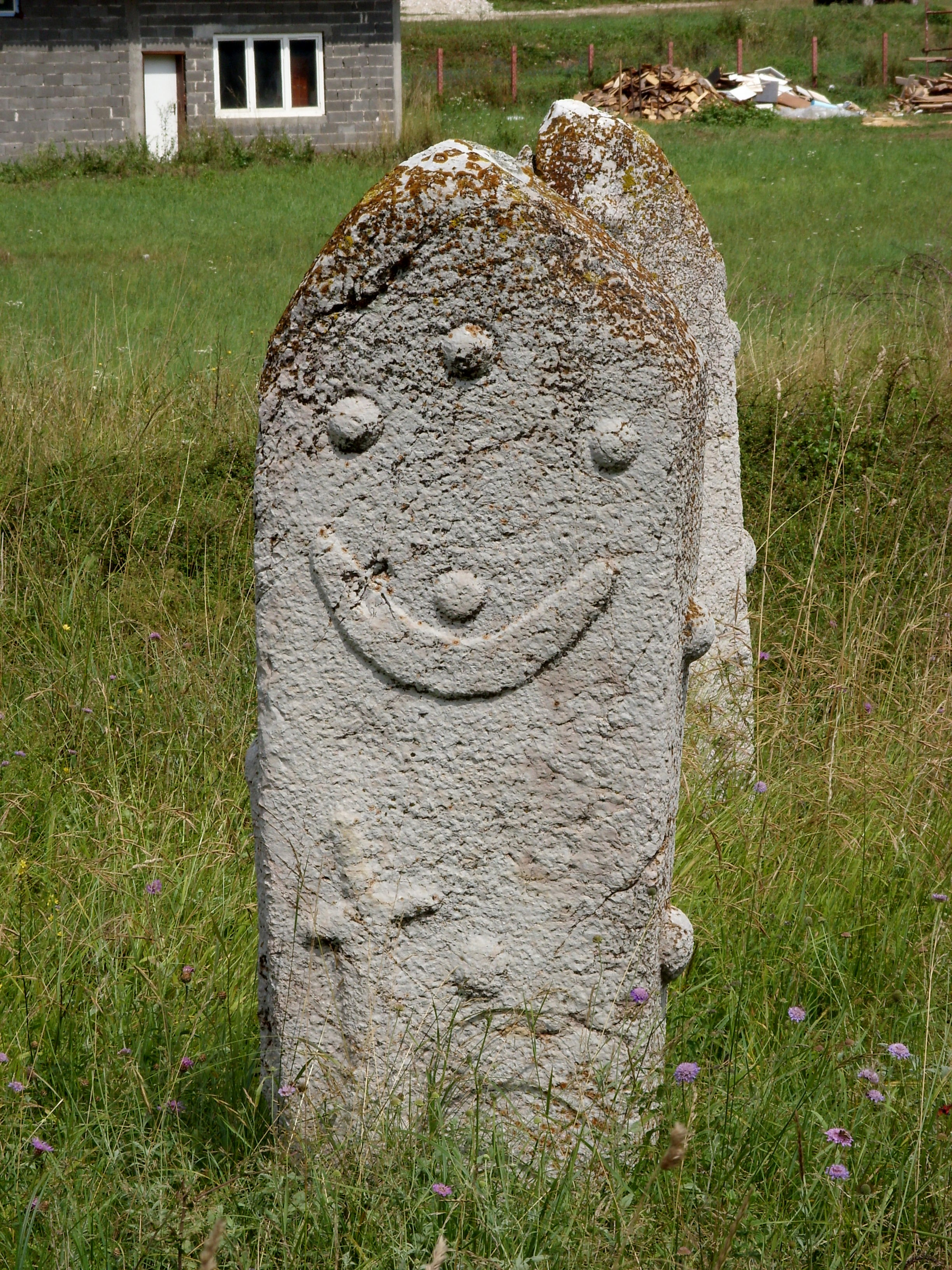
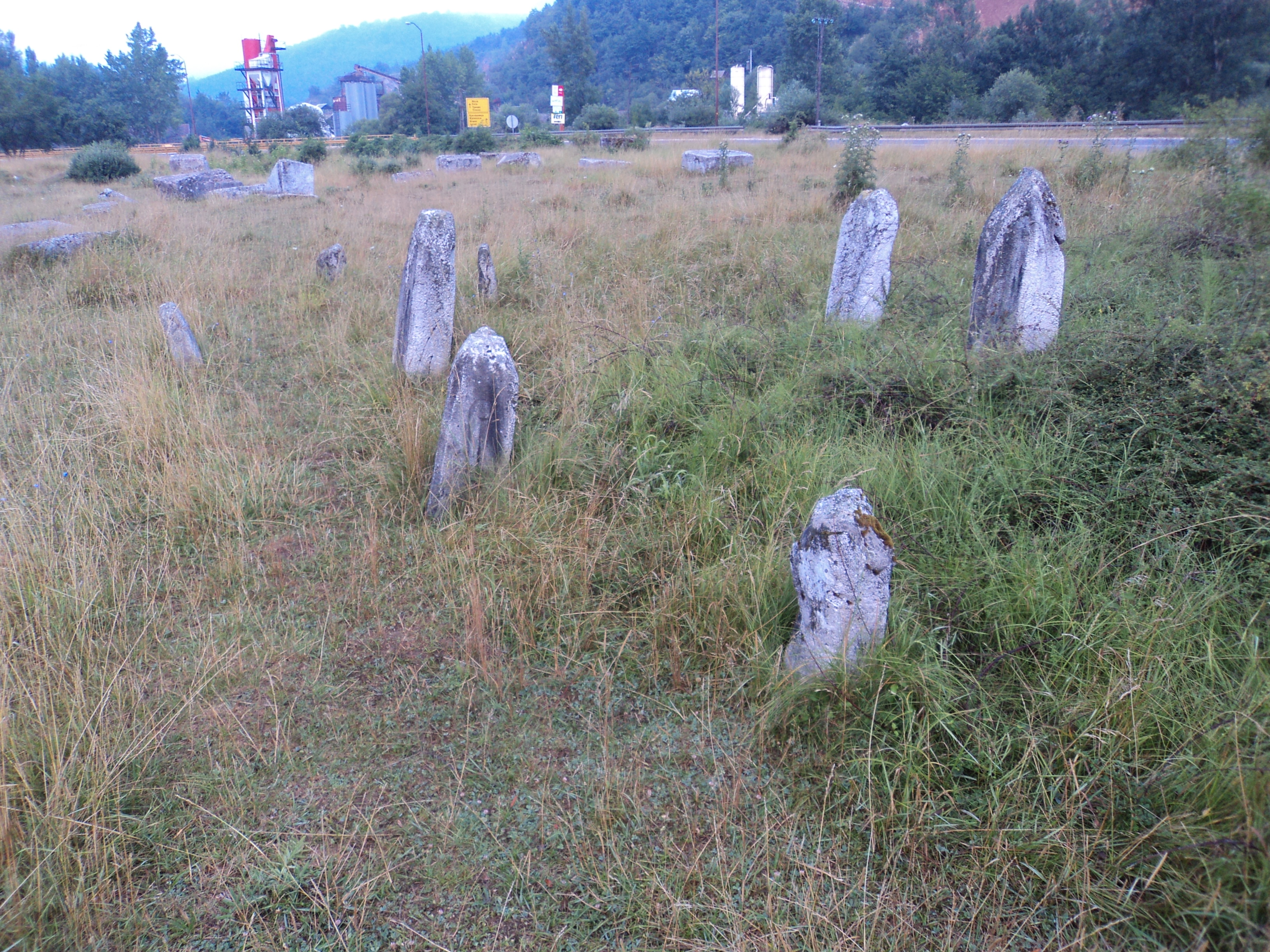
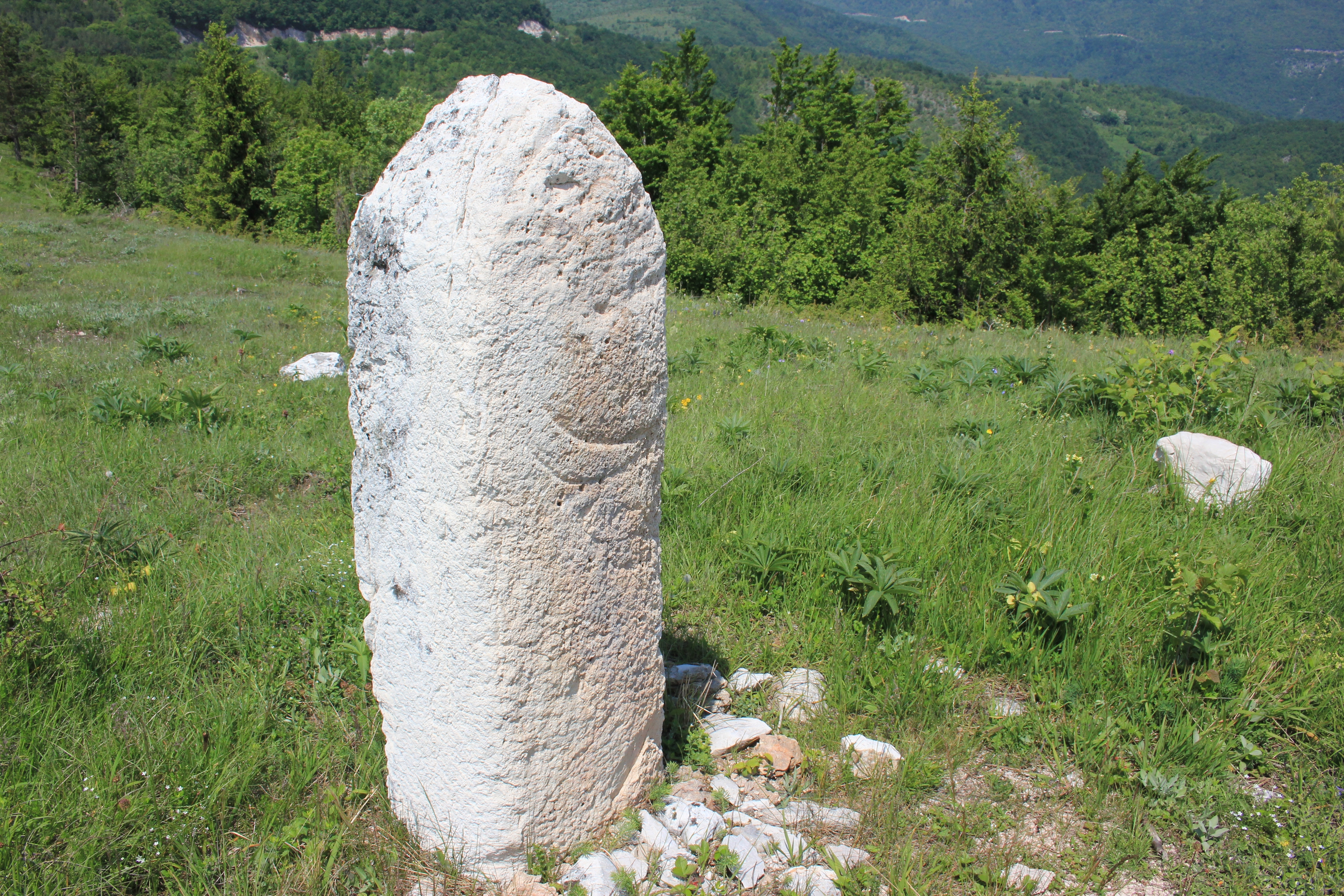
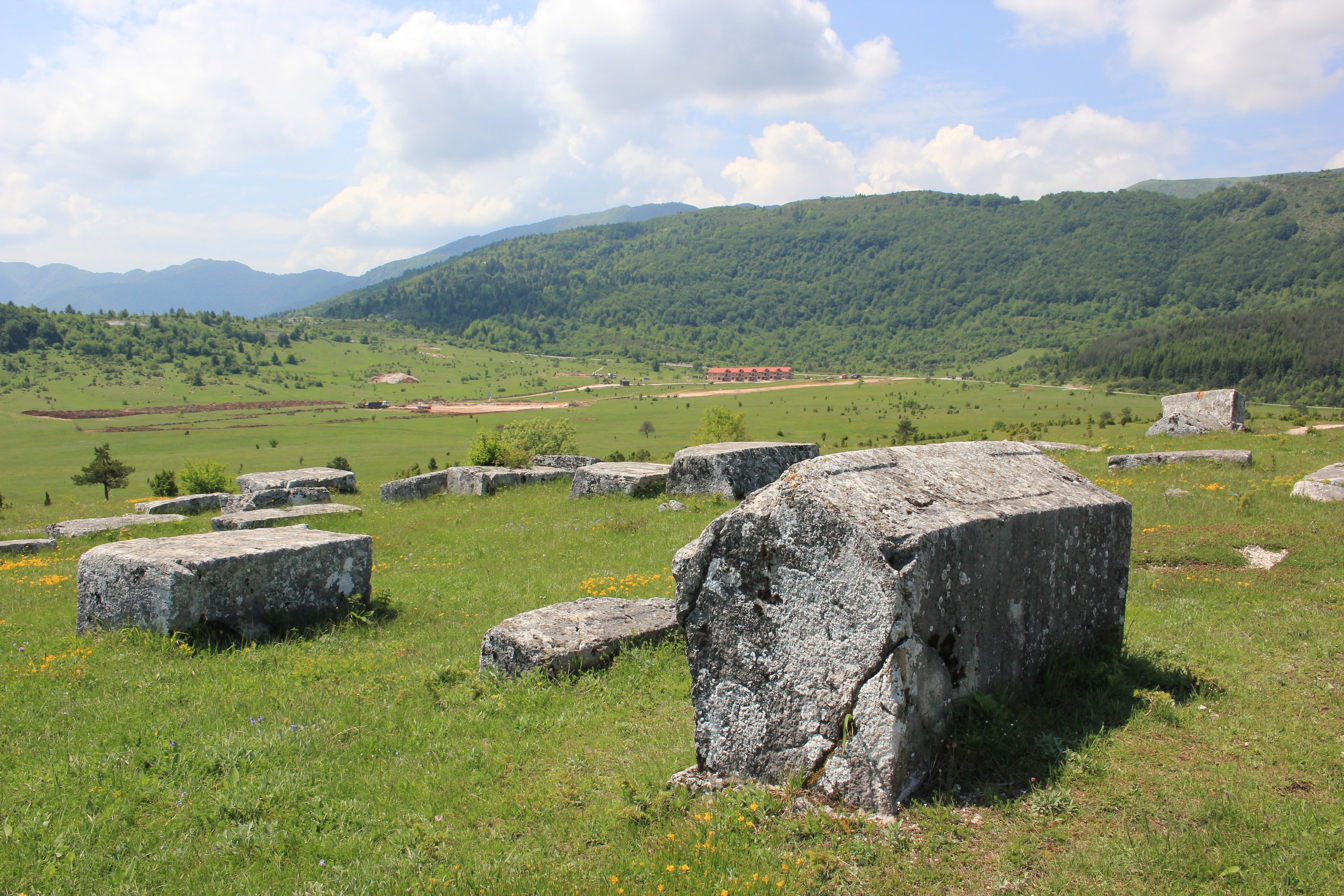
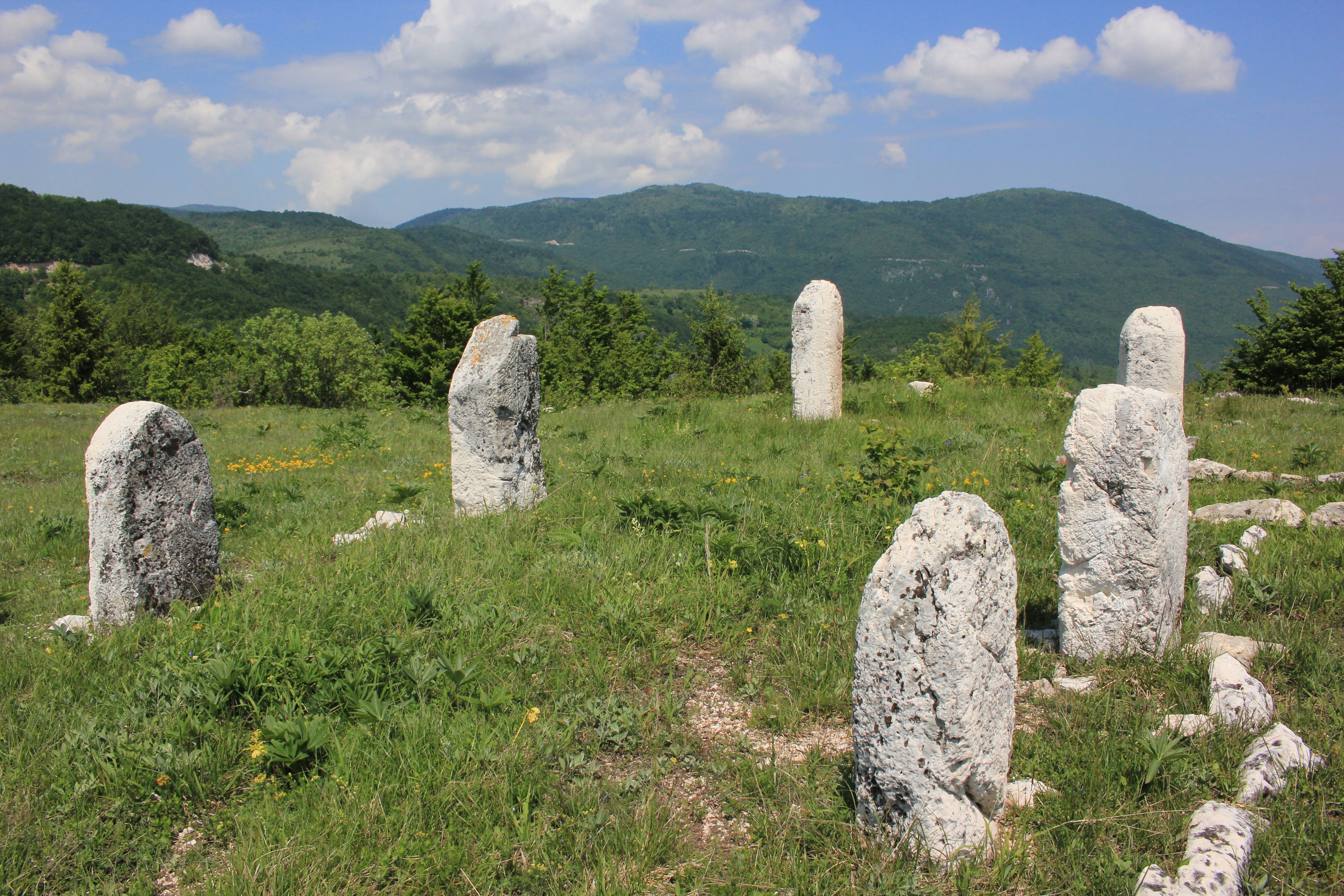
Necropolises with both stećaks and early nišans - Krupac necropolis and Kaursko Greblje near Sarajevo,

The stećak to nišan transition is a period in Bosnia and Herzegovina history marked by the end of the stećak tombstones usage and the transition to the first nišan tombstones. It is a cultural phenomenon on the territory of Bosnia and Herzegovina temporally framed by the period between the second half of the 15th and the first half of the 16th century, a few decades before and several decades after the Ottoman occupation ending a period of the medieval Bosnian state.

The tombstones of this form appear in many localities, such as around Sarajevo, Trnovo, Kalinovik, Rogatica, Olovo, Sokolac, Nevesinje, Prozor, Travnik and Glamoč.

As Bosnia and Herzegovina's heritage, these tombstones are protected by KONS, whether they are found alone or in groups as part of necropolis.

== History ==
=== Stećak ===
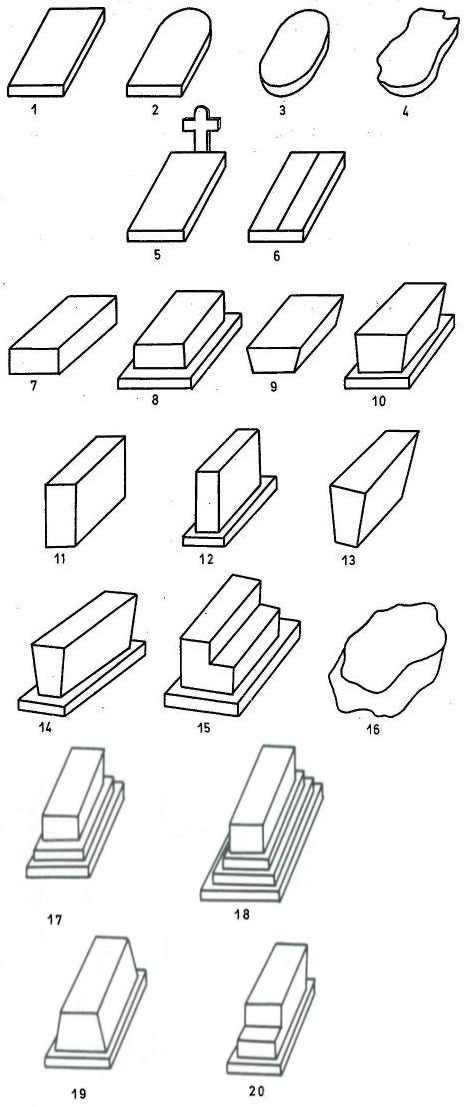
Stecak forms - basic slabs, chests, pedestals

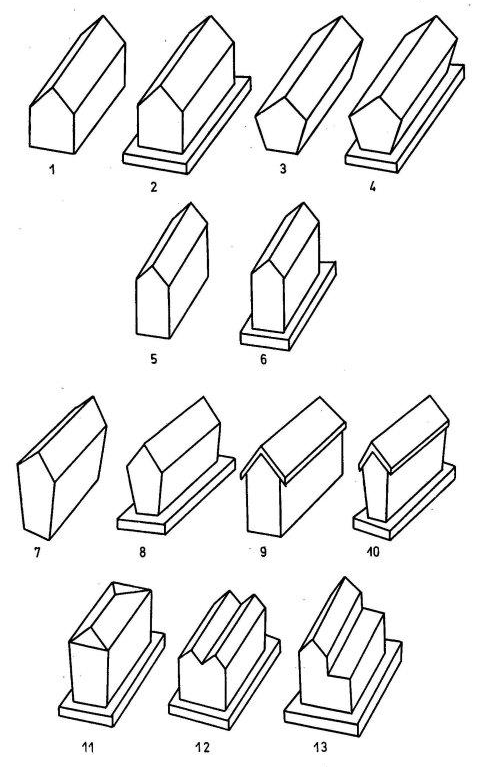
Stecak forms -basic- gables

Of the total number of stećak tombstones, the erection of which began in the 11th century, majority of 95.5% are horizontal slabs, boxes and gables. The rest are upright stećci. According to the time of their construction, upright stećak tombstones belong to the late period and the end of the stećak tombstones usage. The territory and time of their origin, as well as some other properties, confirm that they were created under the influence of Muslim tombstones. In a large number of cases, the necropolises with stećak tombstones have old Muslim cemeteries with nišan tombstones, which are in many ways similar to upright stećak tombstones.

Territorial closeness and other similarities refer to the period of the second half of the 15th and the first half of the 16th century. This was the time when the medieval Bosnian state lost its independence and came under the rule of the Ottoman Empire.

The forms of stećak tombstones of oriental origin meant their final chapter. The new forms, along with the sign of the cross, became a permanent grave sign. Slight penetration of nišan tombstones into the eastern areas of Bosnia and Herzegovina during the 15th century, which can be traced by numerous inscriptions on nišan tombstones, culminated in the tombstones of various proportions, most interesting in the case of those in Donji Bakići near Olovo, whose harmonious decoration carved for this purpose, perhaps for the last time.

=== Nišan ===
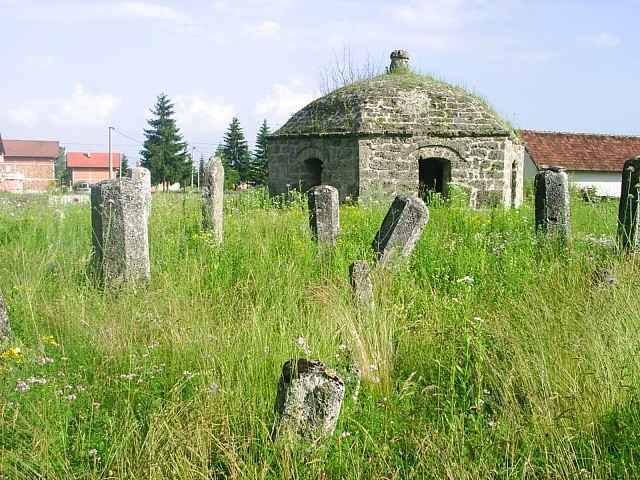
Old Bosnian Muslims' cemetery with nišans tombstones and turbe.

Nišans are tombstones erected for members of the Islamic faith. The name is taken from the Persian via Ottoman Turkish language and means sign, target, mark.

The Arabs, as the first bearers of Islam, did not know tombstones in the form of nišan. The Seljuk Turks carved their tombstones in the form of steles of various shapes. The shape of the stele could have been taken by the Seljuks from various sides, since this form of tombstone is widespread. It was taken from the peoples of the Caucasus, Georgians and Armenians. The relief repertoire of the Seljuk stele was taken from the older Islamic Central Asian homeland (Persia). In other words, the Seljuk stele is a combination of an Armenian-Georgian tombstone associated with Central Asian and Persian-Islamic cultural heritage.

The second type of nišan - one with a turban - is basically an original Seljuk type of tombstone that was further developed later in the Ottoman period.

== The emergence of nišan tombstones in Bosnia ==
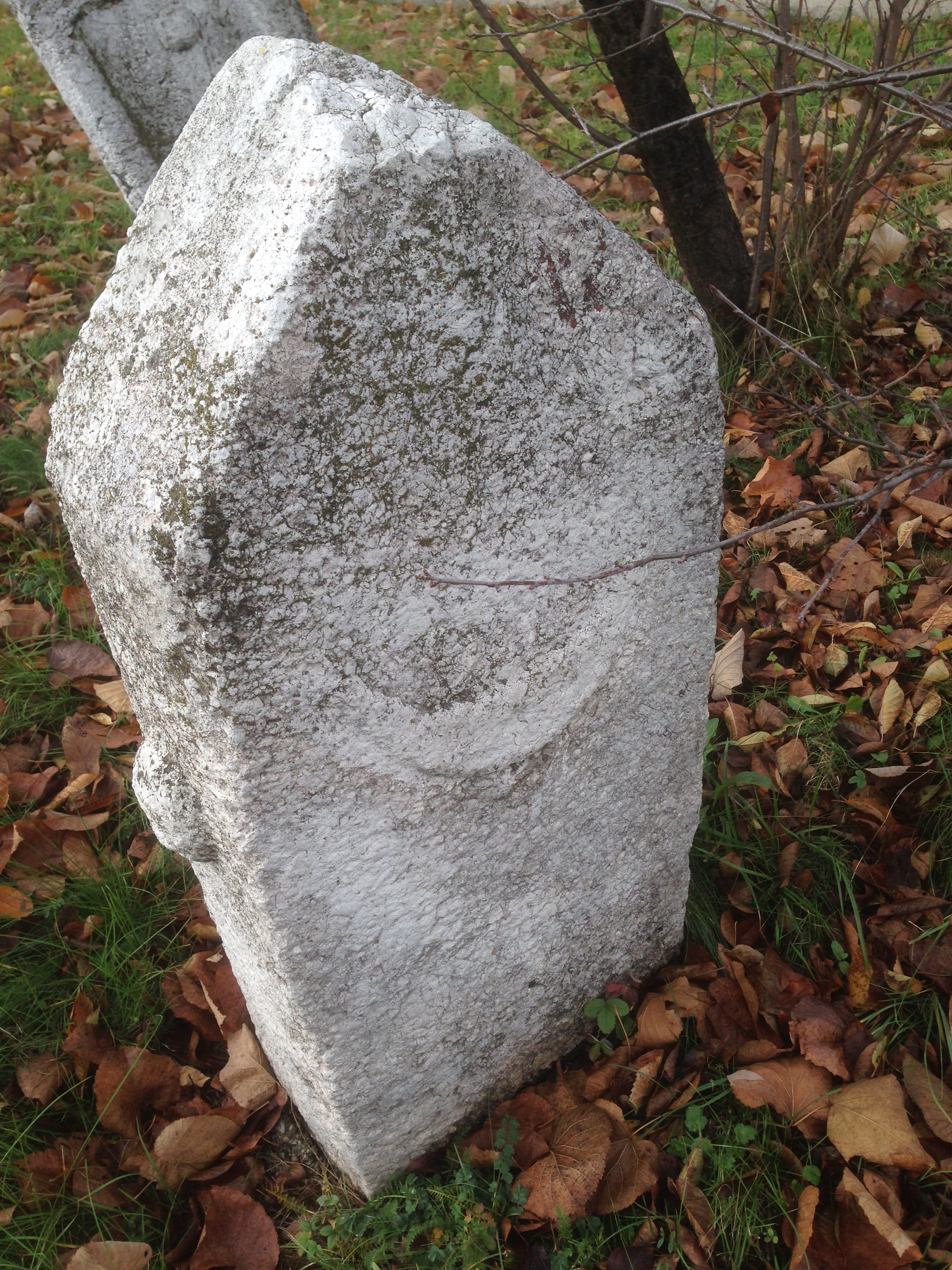
Old cemetery Velika Drveta

With the arrival of the Ottomans and the emergence of Islam in Bosnia and Herzegovina, nišan became a new type of tombstone, and by their characteristics they represent an interesting and important cultural and artistic phenomenon in the country.

Both types of nišan, stele and nišan with a turban, were brought by the Ottomans, first to North Macedonia and Serbia, and later to Bosnia and Herzegovina. These nišans had ornaments on them (symbols, figural motifs), so this liberal Seljuk view of representations of living beings contributed to the creation of a favorable climate for nišans, although objects of Islamic art, to accept figural representations found on stećaks, especially as an expression of the rooted stećak stonemasonry tradition. In that first period, the unity of stećak and nišan becomes clear, when the former basically served as a template for decorative motifs. The stonemasons of the Muslim nišans themselves were Christians, and only in a later period did the Muslims themselves make nišans of completely different shapes and decorations.

The oldest nišans on the territory of Bosnia and Herzegovina belong to the period of the second half of the 15th and the entire 16th century. The general characteristics of those early nišans are:

- large dimensions
- two main forms as stelae and pillar
- relief motifs that were directly transferred from stećak
- absence of epitaphs in oriental languages
- inscriptions in Bosnian Cyrillic (Bosančica)
- they are regularly located together with stećci or in the immediate vicinity.

Because of these features, they are significantly different from nišans of the later period, 17th centuries onward.

=== Stelae ===
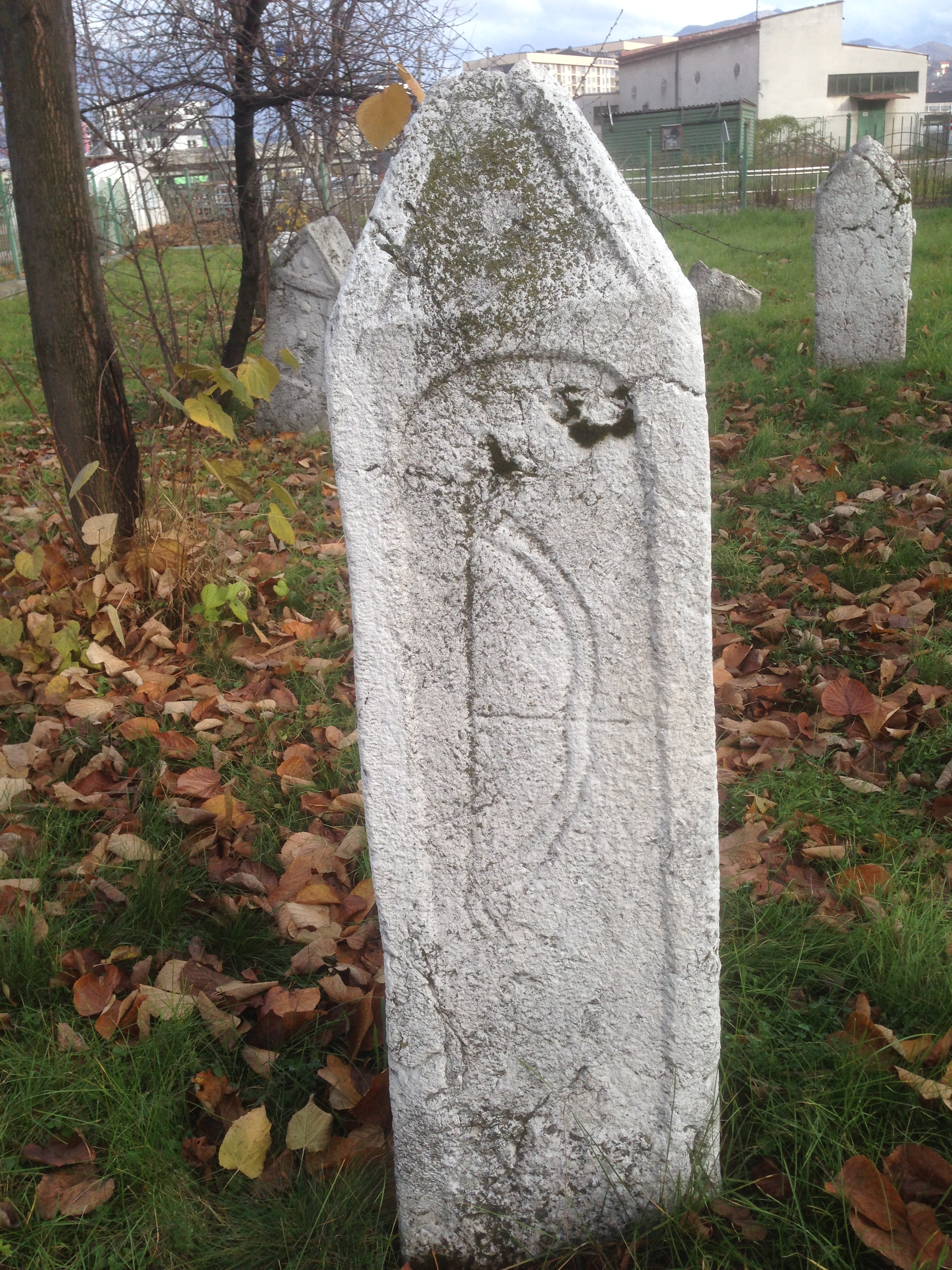
Old cemetery Velika Drveta

Stelae are upright slabs that sometimes end with a flat or rounded surface, but most often with a gable roof on two, and then three, sloping sides.

The pillars are four-sided upright prisms, approximately equal in width and thickness, which turn into a pyramid at the top and end in a hemisphere or turn into a cylindrical neck on which is a turban with its pointed end. Columns with a pyramid are usually relatively large, and are called obelisks. Accordingly, the pillars can be divided into obelisks and nišans with a stone sphere carved in form of turban.

=== Ornamentation ===
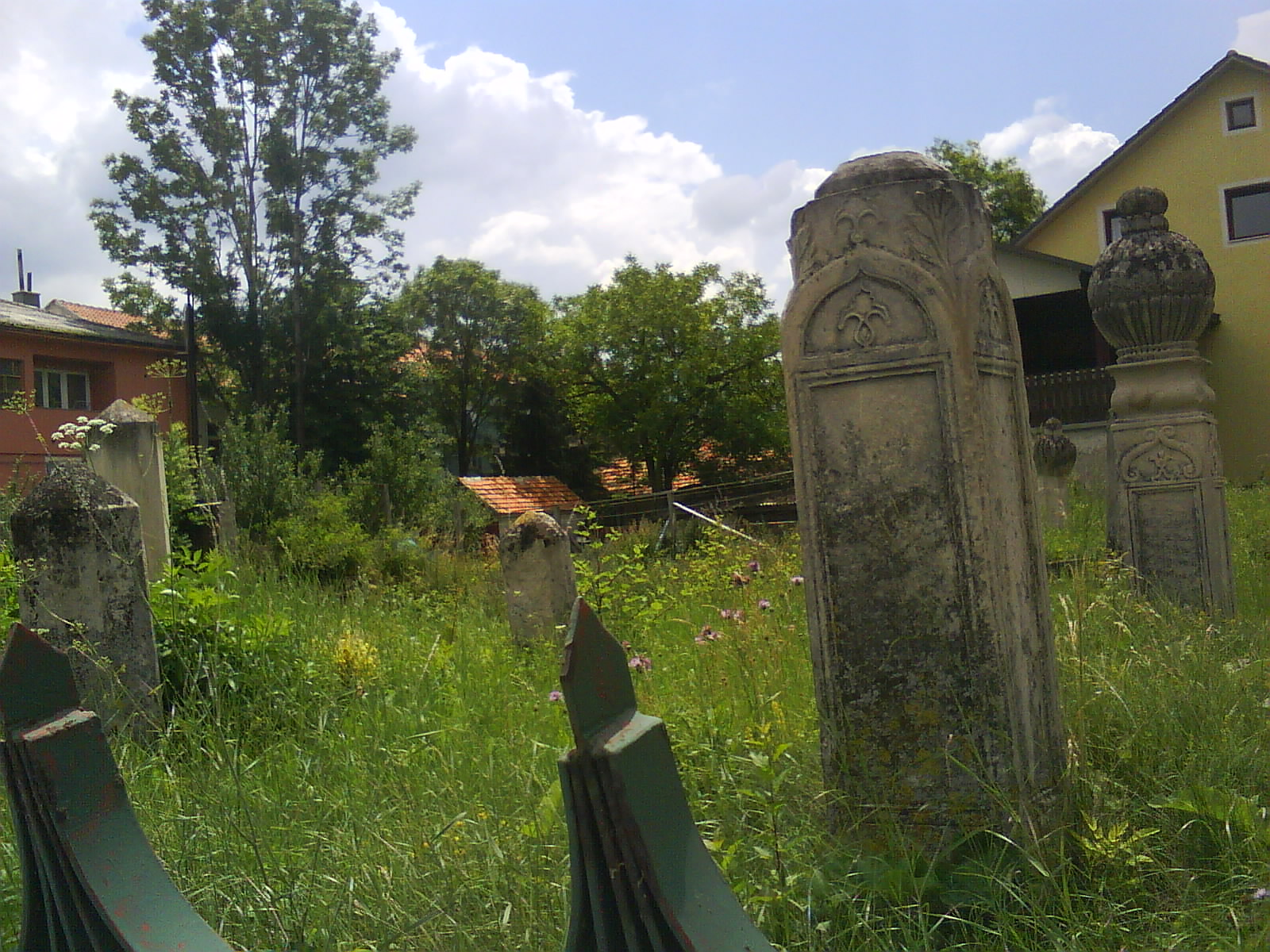
Muslim cemetery in Livno

Nišans of the 15th and 16th century are characterized by large dimensions and relief motifs that were directly transferred from the stećak. Motifs are pure decoration, symbols or figurative representations. They are usually shallow plastic in relation to the background or are only etched. All representations are unevenly carved, mostly simple and rough, although there are also finely carved ones.

In the localities of Sarajevo, Trnovo, Kalinovik, Rogatica, Olovo, Sokolac, Nevesinje, Prozor, Travnik and Glamoč, there are 29 nišans on the sides of which are figural motifs. In 24 cases there are animal motifs: bird, horse, deer, doe, dog, snake, lion and boar. Human figures appear in 19 cases.

There are non-figural motifs on over 200 nišans: hand, crescent moon, half apple, rosette, club, and motifs of war, hunting and tournaments. A saber appears, while a sword appeared exclusively on stećaks.

=== Inscriptions ===
Nišans of that time do not have epitaphs in oriental languages, which will appear in large numbers later, but they have inscriptions in Bosnian Cyrillic (Bosančica), such as appear on stećci. Seven inscriptions on the nišans written in Bosnian are known. The inscriptions on the nišans are of different shapes, one is plate-shaped, one is a stele with a gabled roof, one is an upright four-sided prism with a turban on top, and 4 are four-sided pillars with pyramidal ends and a so-called "half-apple".

== Christian nišans ==
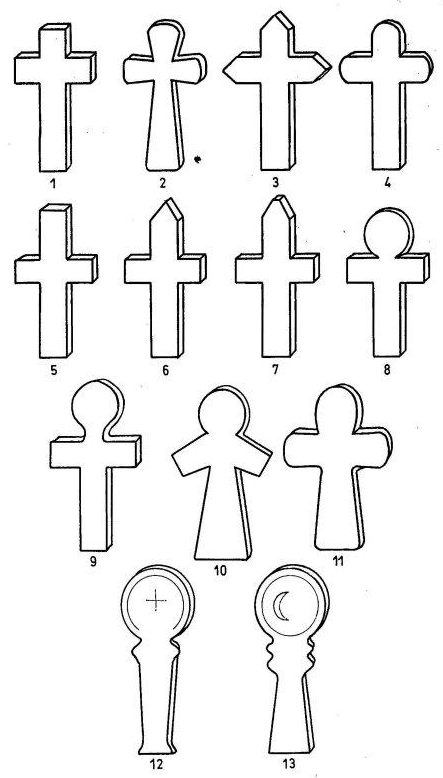
Stecak forms -basic- cross-columns, transitional to Muslim nišans

Significant number of Christian graves of that time are marked with the monuments that do not differ in any way from the Muslims' nišan tombstones, except that a cross or an inscription stating that the buried man was a Christian (member of the Bosnian Church, Catholicism, or Orthodoxy) is carved on them. Such tombstones are called Christian nišans.

These are usually upright plates with rounding at the top. Beneath the lining of the part they often have two rounded protrusions. Some do not even have the sign of the cross.

Monuments of this type are regularly found in areas that were previously remote from Ottoman settlements. Instead of stećak tombstones, tombstones in the shape of nišan tombstones, even without the sign of the cross, while still fearfully retaining some common symbolic signs from earlier stećak tombstones, were erected by Christians under the new historical conditions.

From the review of the monument considered as a Christian nišan, the transition from the lying form of the stećak, through the upright massive prismatic form, to the nišan shape, and finally to the regular cross itself, is noticeable with more or less gradualness.

== Stećak (obelisk, pillar, nišan) in Donji Bakići (Olovo) ==
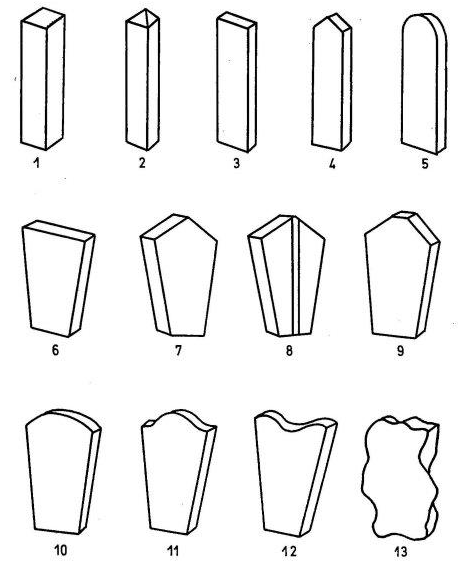
Stecak forms -basic- columns

In the village of Bakići near Olovo, there is a historical complex consisting of: two stećaks in the Pod Klisa or Varošište locality, the remains of the medieval church of St. Roko (shrine of Our Lady of Olovo) and the necropolis with 24 stećaks in the locality of Klisa; a necropolis with 14 stećaks in the Grebljica locality; obelisk (pillar, nišan) in the locality of Vlaškovac; necropolis with 43 stećaks in the Slavanj locality and 16 nišans in the Svatovsko Greblje locality. It was declared a National Monument of Bosnia and Herzegovina.

The dimensions of the obelisk are: height from the base to the square pyramid 300 cm, to the stone sphere 365 cm and from the base to the very top 410 cm. The height of the pyramid is 65 cm, the height of the stone sphere is 45 cm.

The monument is also richly decorated with symbolic representations on all four sides, and the decorations are divided into fields. Instead of sharp edges, the monument has a twisted ribbon on all sides as an ornament, which also serves to divide decorative fields.

All decorations are made in the form of relief protrusions. The basic motifs on the obelisk are: S-motifs and an animal figure (boar) with a shield. Then come the spiral turns, bunches and dots. The composition of a boar with a shield is supposed to denote a heraldic sign, it is repeated on all four sides and is one of the few on monuments of this type in Bosnia and Herzegovina.

Connecting the symbol of the boar, the name of the village (Bakići) and the name of the locality (Vlaškovac), Šefik Bešlagić attributes the monument to one of the members of the Bakić noble family. The family became integrated into Ottoman feudalism early on. They were Ottoman officials with the right to collect tribute, with a titles of knez and sipahi, with large estates on the territory of the Smederevo Sanjak. Pavle Bakić moved to Hungary, where King Ferdinand I appointed him Serbian despot (the last one). The Hungarian historian Thallóczy published a coat of arms of unknown origin, on which there is a boar's head.

If the coat of arms on the obelisk belongs to one of the members of this noble family, the Bakićs, then Pavle Bakić was a man who, as a meritorious Ottoman functionary, received a timar near Olovo. This Bakić could have remained in his religion, or accepted Islam. A monument in the form of a nišan was erected to him, as was erected to Mahmut Branković or Radivoj Oprašić.

== Representative examples ==
=== Necropolis Harem ===
The necropokis called Harem near the Trnovo settlement of Turovi, at the foot of the Treskavica mountain, most illustratively depicts the age of the settlement of the same name. There are numerous stećak necropolises from medieval times in this area. In the Harem there is an old nišan on one side of which a man in a medieval short dress is clearly depicted (whose illustration can be seen on stećak tombstones), while next to his head are the sun and the moon as symbols of two images of the world. On the other side is carved earth. Next to this nišan are scattered old martyr nišan on which swords, sabers and axes and maces are clearly carved. The largest nišan is on the Pasha's Grave. It is believed that a certain Solan Pasha, who opposed the Sultan's will and who ended up in the basement of the Vratnik fortress in Sarajevo, is buried here. The memory of him remains in the name of nearby Pasha's Mountain. It is interesting that the locals freshly paint the stones every year, which is why they stand out for their whiteness. No one knows why should they continue to paint them, except that they take it as a tradition and custom. This part of the necropolis is a significant place for the village customs because it serves as a place from where the children, relatives, guests, wedding guests, etc., are sent off on their way from this very spot.

=== Kaursko groblje in Prečansko Polje and in Umoljani ===
Another good example of these transitional tombstones is in Umoljani.

Not far away, another nercopolis is located on the way to Prečani in Prečansko Polje, from the direction of Šabanci and Dejičići, wider locality at the foot of the Treskavica mountain in Trnovo municipality. It's a part of a group of two large necropolises jointly called Kaursko groblje. This necropolis is heritage site of Bosnia and Herzegovina, and also included in UNESCO World Heritage as part of Stećak inclusion project.

=== Nišan Mahmuta Brankovića ===
Mahmut Branković's nišan from Petrovo polje in Brankovići, near Rogatica, is in the form of an obelisk, 3 m high, and was transferred to the National Museum in Sarajevo. In the inscription in Bosančica, just like found in stećaks, it is said that he was killed in battle at Despotovo, that he was buried on his hereditary land in Polje, and at the end the craftsman who made the nišan is blessed. In the inscription itself, the headstone monument is called a bilig (biljeg; transl. landmark – transl. sign, marker). The monument was erected on one's own land, not on common land, which is a signal that at that time families who wanted to have a family cemetery were differentiated and that they did not follow the Christian custom of burial next to churches and in localities that were officially consecrated for that purpose.

Mahmut Branković, according to folklore, originate from the despotic Branković family that converted to Islam and came from Serbia with the Ottomans, which could have some factual bearings as it can be seen in the common heraldic lion motifs. This could mean that at least one member of that noble house converted to Islam and distinguished himself in the battles around Sarajevo with Vuk Grgurević as Ottoman vassals, where Vuk was killed. The monument was erected around 1480. There are Brankovićs in Rogatica still to this day.

=== Nišan Radivoja Oprašića ===
Nišan Radivoja Oprašića was erected at the Biljeg locality, Oprašić settlement, near Rogatica. It is an obelisk in the form of a regular four-sided prism with a shortened pyramid and a sphere on top. It is decorated with the motifs of a lion, sword, mace, spear with flag, disk, crescent moon and half-apple.

There is no historical information about Radivoj Oprašić, but the details on his nišan indicate that he was a member of the Bosnian nobility. Also, based on the motifs of the lion, it could be that he served Mahmut Branković, or like him maybe belonged to the Branković feudal family. What is certain is that after the arrival of the Ottomans, he became their functionary, his social status was recognized and so he could remain in the old faith. His nišan is also transferred to the National Museum in Sarajevo.

=== Other examples ===
Some other nišans with epitaphs in Bosnian Cyrillic are Radilović nišan in Čadovina, Skender's nišan from Fatnica, Suliman Oškupica nišan from Dumanjići, Govedović nišan near Kalinovik.

All early nišans with inscriptions have a lot in common with stećci, and little in common with later nišans. They are written in the same alphabet, bosančica, and letters of the same shape. The same original vernacular is represented in both the stećak inscriptions and the early nišan inscriptions.

They use common characteristic terms such as: Ase, AsieE, Sie, Baština, Bileg, etc.

They are written using the same technical procedure. Most significantly, the nišans were carved in the same workshops where stećci were carved, and in some cases by the same master-stonemason. In connection with this, there is interesting archival information about a stonemason from Sarajevo. In 1528, there is a mention of mason Mahmut, son of Vukman, who lives and works in Sagr Hadži Alija Mahala in Sarajevo (today Sagradžije Street). Therefore, Mahmut, having converted to Islam, continued his father's trade.

All of the above leads to the conclusion that the artistic influence of the stećak on the early nišans with inscriptions in Bosnian was rather strong.

== Bibliography ==
- Buturović, Amila (3 March 2016). Carved in Stone, Etched in Memory: Death, Tombstones and Commemoration in Bosnian Islam since c.1500. Routledge. ISBN 978-1-317-16957-4.
- Šefik Bešlagić, Sarajevo: “Veselin Masleša“, 1982. Stećci – Kultura I Umjetnost
