= Trnovo, Bosnia and Herzegovina =

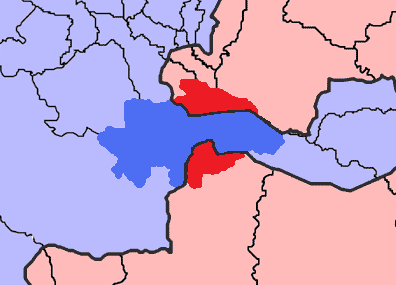
Trnovo (FBiH) in blue and Trnovo (RS) in red.

Trnovo is a municipality located about 30 kilometers southeast of the city of Sarajevo, in Bosnia and Herzegovina. As a result of the 1995 Dayton Accords, the municipality was divided between the Federation of Bosnia and Herzegovina (FBiH) and Republika Srpska (RS) into the following two municipalities:

- Trnovo, Republika Srpska
- Trnovo, Federation of Bosnia and Herzegovina

== Villages ==
• Balbašići • Bašci • Bistročaj • Bobovica • Bogatići • Boljanovići • Brda • Brutusi • Čeružići • Češina Strana • Čunčići • Dejčići • Delijaš · Deseci • Divčići • Donja Presjenica • Dujmovići • Durakovići • Godinja • Gornja Presjenica • Govedovići • Grab • Gračanica • Hamzići • Ilovice • Jablanica • Jelačići • Karovići • Kijevo • Klanac • Kozija Luka • Kramari • Krsmanići • Ledići • Lisovići • Lukavac • Mađari • Mijanovići • Milje • Obla Brda • Ostojići • Pendičići • Podivič • Pomenovići • Prečani • Rajski Do • Rakitnica • Rijeka • Sjeverovići • Slavljevići • Šabanci • Šabići • Šišići • Tošići • Trebečaj • Trnovo • Turovi • Tušila • Ulobići • Umčani • Umoljani • Vrbovnik • Zabojska • Zagor

== Demographic history ==
=== 1971 ===
9,555 total

- Muslims - 6,342 (66.37%)
- Serbs - 3,093 (32.37%)
- Croats - 50 (0.52%)
- Yugoslavs - 12 (0.12%)
- Others - 58 (0.62%)

=== 1991 ===
6,991

- Muslims - 4,790 (68.81%)
- Serbs - 2,059 (29.45%)
- Croats - 16 (0.22%)
- Yugoslavs - 72 (1.02%)
- Others - 54 (0.80%)
