= Rakitnica =

Rakitnica may refer to:

- Rakitnica (Neretva), a tributary of the Neretva river in Bosnia and Herzegovina
- Rakitnica, Trnovo, a village in Bosnia and Herzegovina
- Rakitnica, Ribnica, a village in Slovenia
- Rakitnica, Demir Hisar, a village in North Macedonia
- Rakitnica (Prača), a tributary of the Prača river in Bosnia and Herzegovina
- Rakitnica, Croatia, a village near Virje, Croatia
