= Bašci =

Bašci Башци
- Village
- Location within Bosnia and Herzegovina
- Coordinates: 43°40′N 18°29′E
- Country: Bosnia and Herzegovina
- Entity: Republika Srpska; Federation of Bosnia and Herzegovina
- Region Canton: Sarajevo; Sarajevo
- Municipality: Trnovo; Trnovo

Area
  - Total: 4.51 sq mi (11.67 km^{2})

Population (2013)
  - Total: 56
  - Density: 12/sq mi (4.8/km^{2})
- Time zone: UTC+1 (CET)
  - Summer (DST): UTC+2 (CEST)

Bašci (Serbian Cyrillic: Башци) is a village in the municipalities of Trnovo, Republika Srpska and Trnovo FBIH, Bosnia and Herzegovina.

== Demographics ==
According to the 2013 census, its population was 56, all of them living in the Federation part thus none in the Republika Srpska part.

Ethnicity in 2013
Ethnicity	Number	Percentage
Bosniaks	52	92.9%
other/undeclared	4	7.1%
Total	56	100%
