= Vrbovnik =

Vrbovnik Врбовник
- Village
- Location within Bosnia and Herzegovina
- Coordinates: 43°40′18″N 18°27′28″E
- Country: Bosnia and Herzegovina
- Entity: Republika Srpska; Federation of Bosnia and Herzegovina
- Region Canton: East Sarajevo; Sarajevo
- Municipality: Trnovo; Trnovo

Area
  - Total: 0.82 sq mi (2.12 km^{2})

Population (2013)
  - Total: 2
  - Density: 2.4/sq mi (0.94/km^{2})
- Time zone: UTC+1 (CET)
  - Summer (DST): UTC+2 (CEST)

Vrbovnik (Serbian Cyrillic: Врбовник) is a village in the municipalities of Trnovo, Republika Srpska and Trnovo FBIH, Bosnia and Herzegovina.

== Demographics ==
According to the 2013 census, its population was 2, both Serbs living in the Federation part thus none in the Republika Srpska part.
