= Ilovice =

Ilovice Иловице
- Village
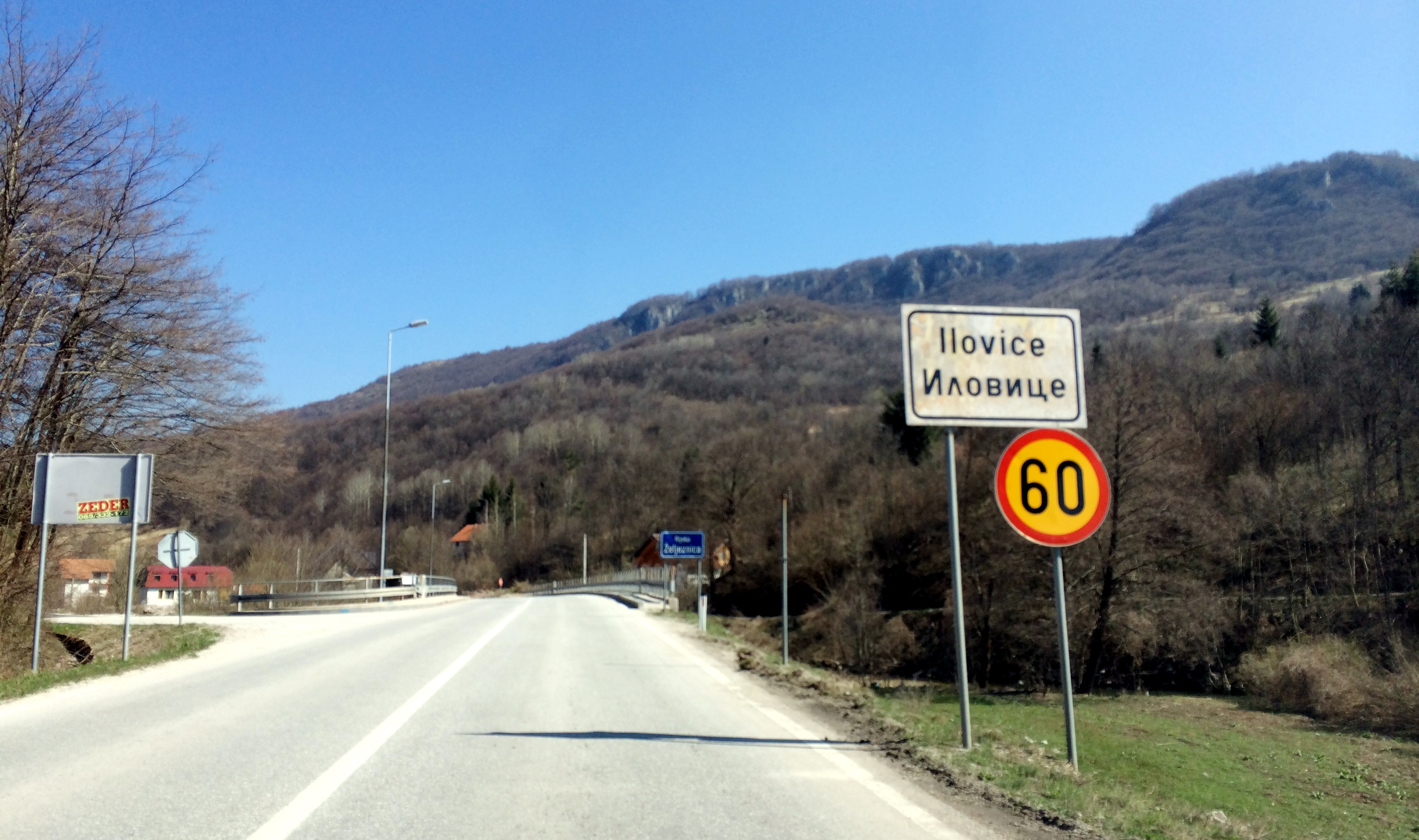

- Location within Bosnia and Herzegovina
- Coordinates: 43°42′N 18°27′E
- Country: Bosnia and Herzegovina
- Entity: Federation of Bosnia and Herzegovina
- Region Canton: Sarajevo; Sarajevo
- Municipality: Trnovo; Trnovo

Area
  - Total: 3.66 sq mi (9.48 km^{2})

Population (2013)
  - Total: 17
  - Density: 4.6/sq mi (1.8/km^{2})
- Time zone: UTC+1 (CET)
  - Summer (DST): UTC+2 (CEST)

Ilovice (Serbian Cyrillic: Иловице) is a village in the municipalities of Trnovo, Republika Srpska and Trnovo FBIH, Bosnia and Herzegovina.

== Demographics ==
According to the 2013 census, its population was 17, all of them living in the Federation part thus none in the Republika Srpska part.

Ethnicity in 2013
Ethnicity	Number	Percentage
Bosniaks	11	64.7%
Serbs	2	11.8%
Croats	1	5.9%
other/undeclared	3	17.6%
Total	17	100%
