= Kozija Luka =

Kozija Luka Козија Лука
- Village
- Location within Bosnia and Herzegovina
- Country: Bosnia and Herzegovina
- Entity: Republika Srpska; Federation of Bosnia and Herzegovina
- Region Canton: Sarajevo; Sarajevo
- Municipality: Trnovo; Trnovo

Area
  - Total: 2.83 sq mi (7.32 km^{2})

Population (2013)
  - Total: 0
  - Density: 0.0/sq mi (0.0/km^{2})
- Time zone: UTC+1 (CET)
  - Summer (DST): UTC+2 (CEST)

Kozija Luka (Serbian Cyrillic: Козија Лука) is a village in the municipalities of Trnovo, Republika Srpska and Trnovo FBIH, Bosnia and Herzegovina.

== Demographics ==
According to the 2013 census, its population was nil.
