= Milje, Trnovo =

Milje Миље
- Village
- Location within Bosnia and Herzegovina
- Coordinates: 43°40′N 18°25′E
- Country: Bosnia and Herzegovina
- Entity: Republika Srpska; Federation of Bosnia and Herzegovina
- Region Canton: East Sarajevo; Sarajevo
- Municipality: Trnovo; Trnovo

Area
  - Total: 3.85 km^{2} (1.49 sq mi)

Population (2013)
  - Total: 2
  - Density: 0.52/km^{2} (1.3/sq mi)
- Time zone: UTC+1 (CET)
  - Summer (DST): UTC+2 (CEST)

Milje (Serbian Cyrillic: Миље) is a village in the municipalities of Trnovo, Republika Srpska and Trnovo FBIH, Bosnia and Herzegovina.

== Demographics ==
According to the 2013 census, its population was 2, both Bosniaks living in the Federation part thus none in the Republika Srpska part.
