= Umčani =

Umčani may refer to:

- Umčani, Bosnia and Herzegovina, a village near Trnovo
- Umčani, Croatia, a village near Vrgorac
