= Grab, Trnovo =

Grab Граб
- Village
- Location within Bosnia and Herzegovina
- Coordinates: 43°43′20″N 18°26′34″E
- Country: Bosnia and Herzegovina
- Entity: Republika Srpska; Federation of Bosnia and Herzegovina
- Region Canton: Sarajevo; Sarajevo
- Municipality: Trnovo; Trnovo

Area
  - Total: 2.80 sq mi (7.24 km^{2})

Population (2013)
  - Total: 4
  - Density: 1.4/sq mi (0.55/km^{2})
- Time zone: UTC+1 (CET)
  - Summer (DST): UTC+2 (CEST)

Grab (Serbian Cyrillic: Граб) is a village in the municipalities of Trnovo, Republika Srpska and Trnovo FBIH, Bosnia and Herzegovina.

== Demographics ==
According to the 2013 census, its population was 4, all Serbs living in the Republika Srpska part, thus none in the Federation part.
