= Prečani =

Prečani may refer to:

- Prečani Serbs, an ethnonym
- Prečani (village), a village in Bosnia
- Prečani, a native plural form for the inhabitants of Preko
