= Gračanica, Trnovo =

Gračanica Грачаница
- Village
- Location within Bosnia and Herzegovina
- Coordinates: 43°44′N 18°17′E
- Country: Bosnia and Herzegovina
- Entity: Republika Srpska; Federation of Bosnia and Herzegovina
- Region Canton: Sarajevo; Sarajevo
- Municipality: Trnovo; Trnovo

Area
  - Total: 1.25 sq mi (3.23 km^{2})

Population (2013)
  - Total: 88
  - Density: 71/sq mi (27/km^{2})
- Time zone: UTC+1 (CET)
  - Summer (DST): UTC+2 (CEST)

Gračanica (Serbian Cyrillic: Грачаница) is a village in the municipalities of Trnovo, Republika Srpska and Trnovo FBIH, Bosnia and Herzegovina.

== Demographics ==
According to the 2013 census, its population was 88, with 87 of them living in the Federation part thus only 1 in the Republika Srpska part.

Ethnicity in 2013
Ethnicity	Number	Percentage
Bosniaks	86	97.7%
other/undeclared	2	2.3%
Total	88	100%
