= Boljanovići, Trnovo =

Boljanovići Бољановићи
- Village
- Location within Bosnia and Herzegovina
- Coordinates: 43°42′02″N 18°31′25″E
- Country: Bosnia and Herzegovina
- Entity: Republika Srpska; Federation of Bosnia and Herzegovina
- Region Canton: Sarajevo; Sarajevo
- Municipality: Trnovo; Trnovo

Area
  - Total: 2.09 sq mi (5.42 km^{2})

Population (2013)
  - Total: 16
  - Density: 7.6/sq mi (3.0/km^{2})
- Time zone: UTC+1 (CET)
  - Summer (DST): UTC+2 (CEST)

Boljanovići (Serbian Cyrillic: Бољановићи) is a village in the municipalities of Trnovo, Republika Srpska and Trnovo FBIH, Bosnia and Herzegovina.

== Demographics ==
According to the 2013 census, its population was 16, all Bosniaks living in the Federation part, thus none in the Republika Srpska part.
