= Zabojska =

Zabojska Забојска
- Village
- Location within Bosnia and Herzegovina
- Coordinates: 43°42′N 18°32′E
- Country: Bosnia and Herzegovina
- Entity: Republika Srpska; Federation of Bosnia and Herzegovina
- Region Canton: East Sarajevo; Sarajevo
- Municipality: Trnovo; Trnovo

Area
  - Total: 2.89 sq mi (7.49 km^{2})

Population (2013)
  - Total: 25
  - Density: 8.6/sq mi (3.3/km^{2})
- Time zone: UTC+1 (CET)
  - Summer (DST): UTC+2 (CEST)

Zabojska (Serbian Cyrillic: Забојска) is a village in the municipalities of Trnovo, Republika Srpska and Trnovo FBIH, Bosnia and Herzegovina.

== Demographics ==
According to the 2013 census, its population was 25, all Serbs living in the Republika Srpska part, thus none in the Federation part.
