= Šabići (Trnovo) =

- Village
- Location within Bosnia and Herzegovina
- Coordinates: 43°39′30″N 18°15′50″E
- Country: Bosnia and Herzegovina
- Entity: Federation of Bosnia and Herzegovina
- Canton: Sarajevo
- Municipality: Trnovo

Area
  - Total: 0.17 sq mi (0.44 km^{2})

Population (2013)
  - Total: 13
  - Density: 77/sq mi (30/km^{2})
- Time zone: UTC+1 (CET)
  - Summer (DST): UTC+2 (CEST)

Šabići is a village in the municipality of Trnovo, Bosnia and Herzegovina.

== Demographics ==
According to the 2013 census, its population was 13, all Bosniaks.
