= Delijaš =

- Village
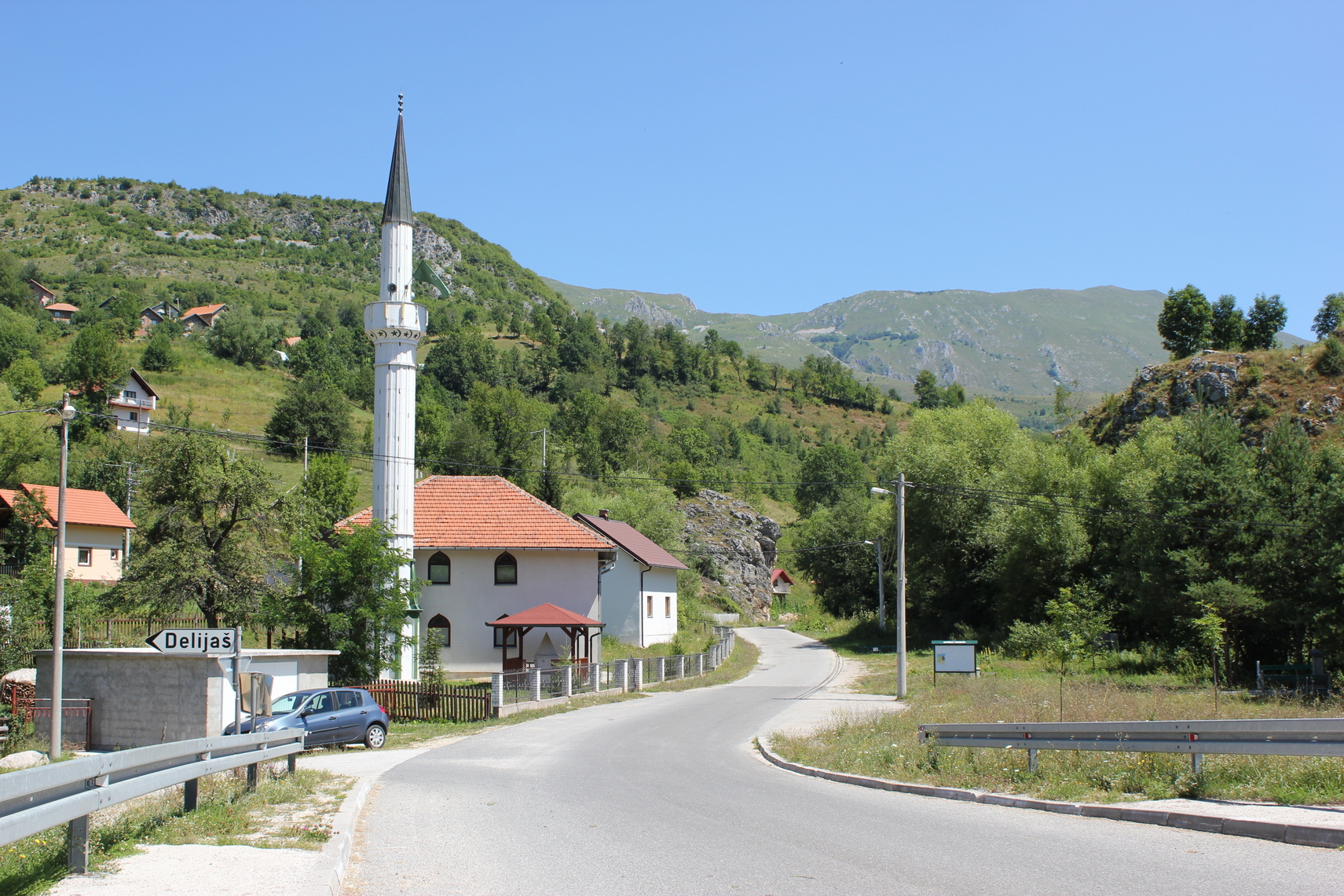

- Location within Bosnia and Herzegovina
- Coordinates: 43°41′N 18°32′E
- Country: Bosnia and Herzegovina
- Entity: Federation of Bosnia and Herzegovina
- Canton: Sarajevo
- Municipality: Trnovo

Area
  - Total: 1.81 sq mi (4.69 km^{2})

Population (2013)
  - Total: 60
  - Density: 33/sq mi (13/km^{2})
- Time zone: UTC+1 (CET)
  - Summer (DST): UTC+2 (CEST)

Delijaš is a village in the municipality of Trnovo, Bosnia and Herzegovina.

Delijaš is the location of a large reception centre for asylum seekers, managed by the Ministry of Security.

== Demographics ==
According to the 2013 census, its population was 60, all Bosniaks.
