= Mijanovići =

- Village
- Location within Bosnia and Herzegovina
- Coordinates: 43°40′43″N 18°22′37″E
- Country: Bosnia and Herzegovina
- Entity: Federation of Bosnia and Herzegovina
- Canton: Sarajevo
- Municipality: Trnovo

Area
  - Total: 1.68 sq mi (4.34 km^{2})

Population (2013)
  - Total: 44
  - Density: 26/sq mi (10/km^{2})
- Time zone: UTC+1 (CET)
  - Summer (DST): UTC+2 (CEST)

Mijanovići is a village in the municipality of Trnovo, Bosnia and Herzegovina.

== Demographics ==
According to the 2013 census, its population was 44.

Ethnicity in 2013
Ethnicity	Number	Percentage
Bosniaks	43	97.7%
other/undeclared	1	2.3%
Total	44	100%
