= Bobovica, Bosnia and Herzegovina =

Bobovica Бобовица
- Village
- Location within Bosnia and Herzegovina
- Coordinates: 43°38′N 18°14′E
- Country: Bosnia and Herzegovina
- Entity: Federation of Bosnia and Herzegovina
- Canton: Sarajevo
- Municipality: Trnovo

Area
  - Total: 3.80 sq mi (9.84 km^{2})

Population (2013)
  - Total: 57
  - Density: 15/sq mi (5.8/km^{2})
- Time zone: UTC+1 (CET)
  - Summer (DST): UTC+2 (CEST)

Bobovica is a village in the municipality of Trnovo, Bosnia and Herzegovina.

== Demographics ==
According to the 2013 census, its population was 57, all Bosniaks.
