= Lisovići (Trnovo) =

- Village
- Location within Bosnia and Herzegovina
- Coordinates: 43°41′19″N 18°25′00″E
- Country: Bosnia and Herzegovina
- Entity: Federation of Bosnia and Herzegovina
- Canton: Sarajevo
- Municipality: Trnovo

Area
  - Total: 0.43 sq mi (1.12 km^{2})

Population (2013)
  - Total: 2
  - Density: 4.6/sq mi (1.8/km^{2})
- Time zone: UTC+1 (CET)
  - Summer (DST): UTC+2 (CEST)

Lisovići is a village in the municipality of Trnovo, Bosnia and Herzegovina.

== Demographics ==
According to the 2013 census, its population was 2, both Serbs.
