= Burda =

Burda is a surname. Notable people with the surname include:

- Aenne Burda (1909–2005), German publisher, co-founder of the Burda group, wife of Franz
- Franz Burda (1903–1986), German publisher, co-founder of the Burda group
- Frieder Burda (1936–2019), German art collector, son of Franz
- Hubert Burda (born 1940), owner of Hubert Burda Media, son of Franz
- Lyubov Burda (born 1953), Russian gymnast
- Michael C. Burda (born 1959), American economist
- Mikołaj Burda (born 1982), Polish rower
- Mykyta Burda (born 1995), Ukrainian footballer

== Fictional characters ==
- Annuzza Burda, character in Annuzza, a Girl of Romania

== See also ==
- Al-Burda, a poem praising Muhammad
- Brda (disambiguation)
