= Šišići =

- Village
- Location within Bosnia and Herzegovina
- Coordinates: 43°40′47″N 18°30′30″E
- Country: Bosnia and Herzegovina
- Entity: Federation of Bosnia and Herzegovina
- Canton: Sarajevo
- Municipality: Trnovo

Area
  - Total: 1.50 sq mi (3.89 km^{2})

Population (2013)
  - Total: 1
  - Density: 0.67/sq mi (0.26/km^{2})
- Time zone: UTC+1 (CET)
  - Summer (DST): UTC+2 (CEST)

Šišići is a village in the municipality of Trnovo, Bosnia and Herzegovina.

== Demographics ==
According to the 2013 census, its population was just 1, a Serb.
