= Tušila =

- Village
- Location within Bosnia and Herzegovina
- Coordinates: 43°37′35″N 18°15′17″E
- Country: Bosnia and Herzegovina
- Entity: Federation of Bosnia and Herzegovina
- Canton: Sarajevo
- Municipality: Trnovo

Area
  - Total: 6.71 sq mi (17.38 km^{2})

Population (2013)
  - Total: 69
  - Density: 10/sq mi (4.0/km^{2})
- Time zone: UTC+1 (CET)
  - Summer (DST): UTC+2 (CEST)

Tušila is a village in the municipality of Trnovo, Bosnia and Herzegovina.

== Demographics ==
According to the 2013 census, its population was 69, all Bosniaks.
