= Ledići =

- Village
- Location within Bosnia and Herzegovina
- Coordinates: 43°40′31″N 18°20′07″E
- Country: Bosnia and Herzegovina
- Entity: Federation of Bosnia and Herzegovina
- Canton: Sarajevo
- Municipality: Trnovo

Area
  - Total: 4.95 sq mi (12.81 km^{2})

Population (2013)
  - Total: 5
  - Density: 1.0/sq mi (0.39/km^{2})
- Time zone: UTC+1 (CET)
  - Summer (DST): UTC+2 (CEST)

Ledići is a village in the municipality of Trnovo, Bosnia and Herzegovina.

== Demographics ==
According to the 2013 census, its population was 5, all Bosniaks.
