= Sjeverovići =

- Village
- Location within Bosnia and Herzegovina
- Coordinates: 43°41′N 18°32′E
- Country: Bosnia and Herzegovina
- Entity: Federation of Bosnia and Herzegovina
- Canton: Sarajevo
- Municipality: Trnovo

Area
  - Total: 2.35 sq mi (6.08 km^{2})

Population (2013)
  - Total: 19
  - Density: 8.1/sq mi (3.1/km^{2})
- Time zone: UTC+1 (CET)
  - Summer (DST): UTC+2 (CEST)

Sjeverovići is a village in the municipality of Trnovo, Bosnia and Herzegovina.

== Demographics ==
According to the 2013 census, its population was 19, all Bosniaks.
