= Čeružići =

- Village
- Location within Bosnia and Herzegovina
- Coordinates: 43°42′N 18°24′E
- Country: Bosnia and Herzegovina
- Entity: Federation of Bosnia and Herzegovina
- Canton: Sarajevo
- Municipality: Trnovo

Area
  - Total: 0.97 sq mi (2.50 km^{2})

Population (2013)
  - Total: 0
  - Density: 0.0/sq mi (0.0/km^{2})
- Time zone: UTC+1 (CET)
  - Summer (DST): UTC+2 (CEST)

Čeružići is a former village in the municipality of Trnovo, Bosnia and Herzegovina. with no inhabitants left now.

== Demographics ==
According to the 2013 census, its population was nil.
