= Gornja Presjenica =

- Village
- Location within Bosnia and Herzegovina
- Coordinates: 43°43′39″N 18°20′02″E
- Country: Bosnia and Herzegovina
- Entity: Federation of Bosnia and Herzegovina
- Canton: Sarajevo
- Municipality: Trnovo

Area
  - Total: 15.99 sq mi (41.41 km^{2})

Population (2013)
  - Total: 32
  - Density: 2.0/sq mi (0.77/km^{2})
- Time zone: UTC+1 (CET)
  - Summer (DST): UTC+2 (CEST)

Gornja Presjenica is a village in the municipality of Trnovo, Bosnia and Herzegovina.

== Demographics ==
According to the 2013 census, its population was 32.

Ethnicity in 2013
Ethnicity	Number	Percentage
Bosniaks	20	62.5%
Croats	2	6.3%
Serbs	1	3.1%
other/undeclared	9	28.1%
Total	32	100%
