= Čunčići =

- Village
- Location within Bosnia and Herzegovina
- Coordinates: 43°42′N 18°34′E
- Country: Bosnia and Herzegovina
- Entity: Federation of Bosnia and Herzegovina
- Canton: Sarajevo
- Municipality: Trnovo

Area
  - Total: 1.49 sq mi (3.86 km^{2})

Population (2013)
  - Total: 4
  - Density: 2.7/sq mi (1.0/km^{2})
- Time zone: UTC+1 (CET)
  - Summer (DST): UTC+2 (CEST)

Čunčići is a village in the municipality of Trnovo, Bosnia and Herzegovina.

== Demographics ==
According to the 2013 census, its population was 4, all Serbs.
