= Krsmanići =

- Village
- Location within Bosnia and Herzegovina
- Coordinates: 43°39′N 18°35′E
- Country: Bosnia and Herzegovina
- Entity: Federation of Bosnia and Herzegovina
- Canton: Sarajevo
- Municipality: Trnovo

Area
  - Total: 0.92 sq mi (2.38 km^{2})

Population (2013)
  - Total: 3
  - Density: 3.3/sq mi (1.3/km^{2})
- Time zone: UTC+1 (CET)
  - Summer (DST): UTC+2 (CEST)

Krsmanići is a village in the municipality of Trnovo, Bosnia and Herzegovina.

== Demographics ==
According to the 2013 census, its population was 3, all Bosniaks.
