= Pendičići =

- Village
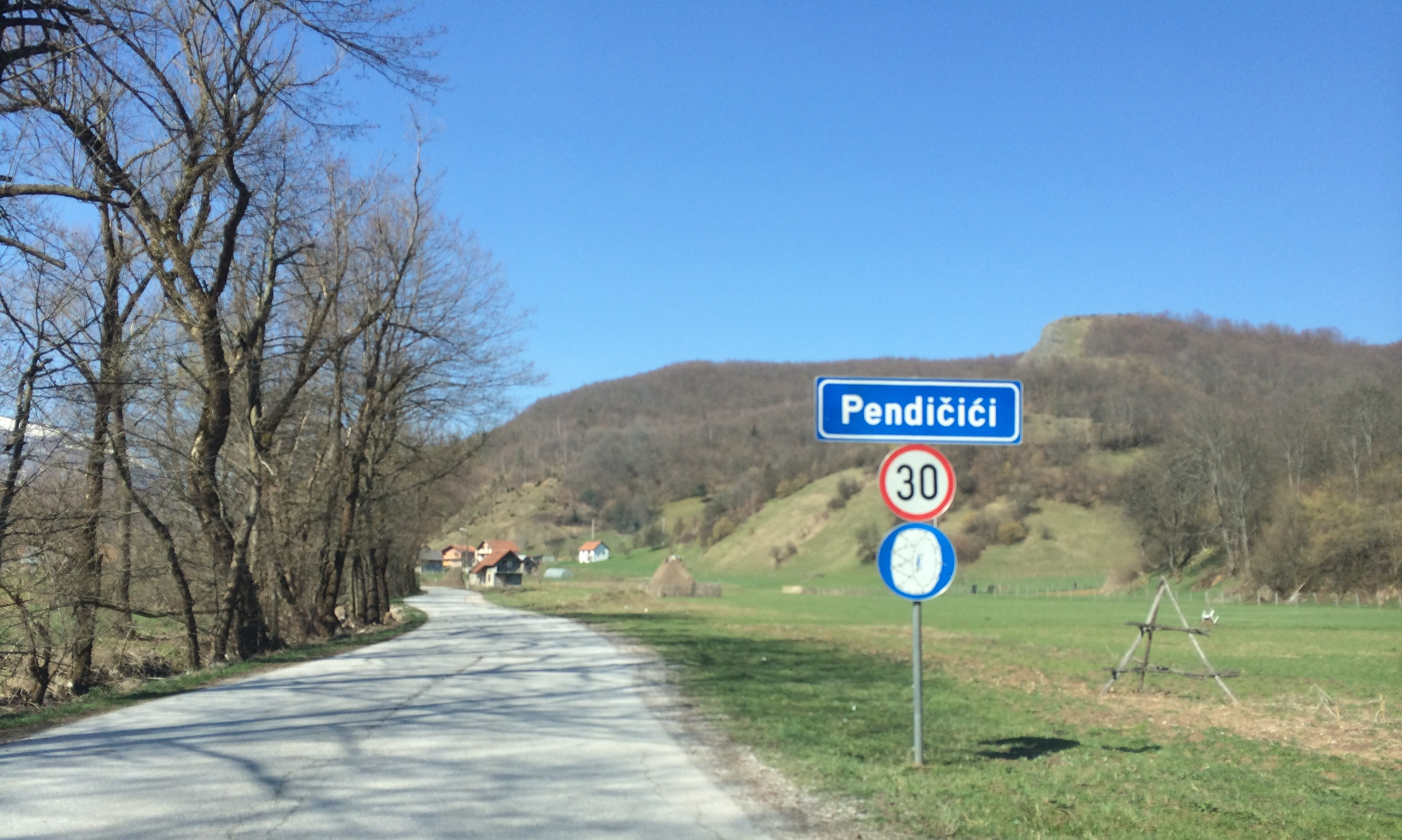

- Location within Bosnia and Herzegovina
- Coordinates: 43°40′48″N 18°26′27″E
- Country: Bosnia and Herzegovina
- Entity: Federation of Bosnia and Herzegovina
- Canton: Sarajevo
- Municipality: Trnovo

Area
  - Total: 0.48 sq mi (1.25 km^{2})

Population (2013)
  - Total: 76
  - Density: 160/sq mi (61/km^{2})
- Time zone: UTC+1 (CET)
  - Summer (DST): UTC+2 (CEST)

Pendičići is a village in the municipality of Trnovo, Bosnia and Herzegovina.

== Demographics ==
According to the 2013 census, its population was 76.

Ethnicity in 2013
Ethnicity	Number	Percentage
Bosniaks	47	61.8%
Serbs	29	38.2%
Total	76	100%
