= Lukavac (Trnovo) =

Lukavac Лукавац
- Village
- Location within Bosnia and Herzegovina
- Coordinates: 43°40′49″N 18°16′01″E
- Country: Bosnia and Herzegovina
- Entity: Federation of Bosnia and Herzegovina
- Canton: Sarajevo
- Municipality: Trnovo

Area
  - Total: 3.86 sq mi (10.00 km^{2})

Population (2013)
  - Total: 42
  - Density: 11/sq mi (4.2/km^{2})
- Time zone: UTC+1 (CET)
  - Summer (DST): UTC+2 (CEST)

Lukavac is a village in the municipality of Trnovo, Bosnia and Herzegovina.

== Demographics ==
According to the 2013 census, its population was 42, all Bosniaks.
