= Karovići (Trnovo) =

Karovići Каровићи
- Village
- Location within Bosnia and Herzegovina
- Coordinates: 43°41′03″N 18°32′51″E
- Country: Bosnia and Herzegovina
- Entity: Federation of Bosnia and Herzegovina
- Canton: Sarajevo
- Municipality: Trnovo

Area
  - Total: 0.53 sq mi (1.38 km^{2})

Population (2013)
  - Total: 32
  - Density: 60/sq mi (23/km^{2})
- Time zone: UTC+1 (CET)
  - Summer (DST): UTC+2 (CEST)

Karovići is a village in the municipality of Trnovo, Bosnia and Herzegovina.

== Demographics ==
According to the 2013 census, its population was 32, all Bosniaks.
