= Ostojići =

- Village
- Location within Bosnia and Herzegovina
- Coordinates: 43°41′33″N 18°21′25″E
- Country: Bosnia and Herzegovina
- Entity: Federation of Bosnia and Herzegovina
- Canton: Sarajevo
- Municipality: Trnovo

Area
  - Total: 1.86 sq mi (4.81 km^{2})

Population (2013)
  - Total: 38
  - Density: 20/sq mi (7.9/km^{2})
- Time zone: UTC+1 (CET)
  - Summer (DST): UTC+2 (CEST)

Ostojići is a village in the municipality of Trnovo, Bosnia and Herzegovina.

== Demographics ==
According to the 2013 census, its population was 38, all Bosniaks.
