= Hamzići (Trnovo) =

- Village
- Location within Bosnia and Herzegovina
- Coordinates: 43°41′05″N 18°34′05″E
- Country: Bosnia and Herzegovina
- Entity: Federation of Bosnia and Herzegovina
- Canton: Sarajevo
- Municipality: Trnovo

Area
  - Total: 2.63 sq mi (6.80 km^{2})

Population (2013)
  - Total: 17
  - Density: 6.5/sq mi (2.5/km^{2})
- Time zone: UTC+1 (CET)
  - Summer (DST): UTC+2 (CEST)

Hamzići is a village in the municipality of Trnovo, Bosnia and Herzegovina.

== Demographics ==
According to the 2013 census, its population was 17, all Bosniaks.
