= Mađari =

- Village
- Location within Bosnia and Herzegovina
- Coordinates: 43°42′N 18°26′E
- Country: Bosnia and Herzegovina
- Entity: Federation of Bosnia and Herzegovina
- Canton: Sarajevo
- Municipality: Trnovo

Area
  - Total: 2.55 sq mi (6.61 km^{2})

Population (2013)
  - Total: 10
  - Density: 3.9/sq mi (1.5/km^{2})
- Time zone: UTC+1 (CET)
  - Summer (DST): UTC+2 (CEST)

Mađari is a village in the municipality of Trnovo, Bosnia and Herzegovina.

== Demographics ==
According to the 2013 census, its population was 10.

Ethnicity in 2013
Ethnicity	Number	Percentage
Serbs	5	50.0%
Bosniaks	2	20.0%
other/undeclared	3	30.0%
Total	10	100%
