= Umoljani =

Umoljani Умољани
- Village
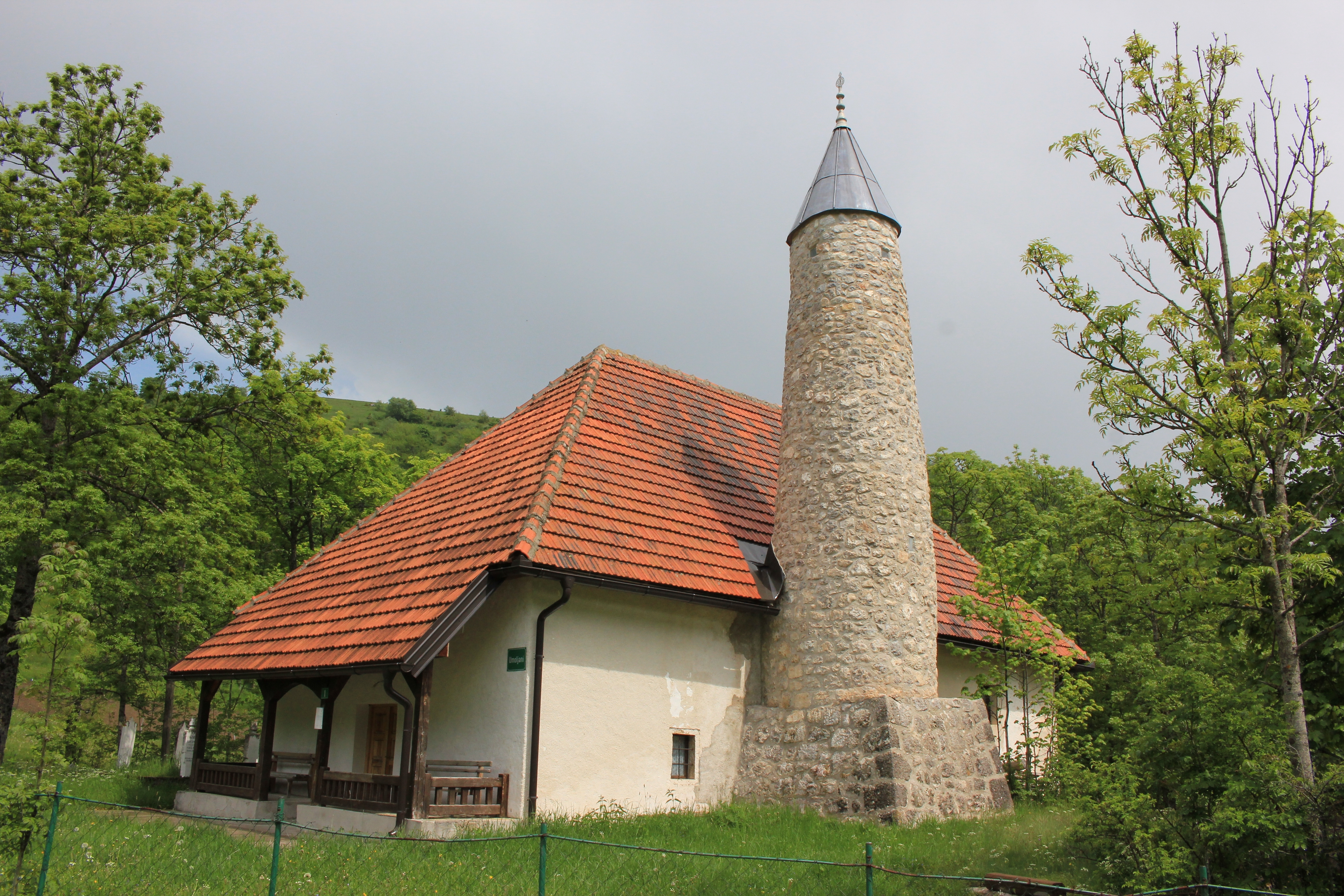
- Mosque in Umoljani

- Location within Bosnia and Herzegovina
- Coordinates: 43°40′N 18°14′E
- Country: Bosnia and Herzegovina
- Entity: Federation of Bosnia and Herzegovina
- Canton: Sarajevo
- Municipality: Trnovo

Area
  - Total: 9.51 sq mi (24.63 km^{2})

Population (2013)
  - Total: 40
  - Density: 4.2/sq mi (1.6/km^{2})
- Time zone: UTC+1 (CET)
  - Summer (DST): UTC+2 (CEST)

Umoljani (Serbian Cyrillic: Умољани) is a village in the municipality of Trnovo, Bosnia and Herzegovina. The village is located at an elevation of over 1200 meters.

== Demographics ==
According to the 2013 census, its population was 40, all Bosniaks.
