= Godinja =

Godinja Годиња
- Village
- Location within Bosnia and Herzegovina
- Coordinates: 43.6485171°N 18.3950883°E
- Country: Bosnia and Herzegovina
- Entity: Federation of Bosnia and Herzegovina
- Canton: Sarajevo
- Municipality: Trnovo

Area
  - Total: 5.19 sq mi (13.44 km^{2})
- Elevation: 3,035 ft (925 m)

Population (2013)
  - Total: 44
  - Density: 8.5/sq mi (3.3/km^{2})
- Time zone: UTC+1 (CET)
  - Summer (DST): UTC+2 (CEST)

Godinja (Serbian Cyrillic: Годиња) is a village in the municipality of Trnovo, Federation of Bosnia and Herzegovina, Bosnia and Herzegovina. Bosnia and Herzegovina is located in the West Balkans region, in Southeast Europe.

== Demographics ==
According to the 2013 census, its population was 44, all Bosniaks.
