= Dumanjići =

Dumanjići Думањићи
- Village
- Location within Bosnia and Herzegovina
- Coordinates: 43°53′54″N 19°02′20″E
- Country: Bosnia and Herzegovina
- Entity: Republika Srpska
- Municipality: Rogatica
- Time zone: UTC+1 (CET)
  - Summer (DST): UTC+2 (CEST)

Dumanjići (Serbian Cyrillic: Думањићи) is a village in the Republika Srpska, Bosnia and Herzegovina. According to the 1991 census, the village is located in the municipality of Rogatica.

The village is located near Sjeversko, Brankovići, and Vratar which are all within 8km
