= Lohovska Brda =

Lohovska Brda Лоховска Брда
- Village
- Location within Bosnia and Herzegovina
- Coordinates: 44°45′32″N 15°54′05″E
- Country: Bosnia and Herzegovina
- Entity: Federation of Bosnia and Herzegovina
- Canton: Una-Sana
- Municipality: Bihać

Area
  - Total: 2.94 sq mi (7.61 km^{2})

Population (2013)
  - Total: 154
  - Density: 52.4/sq mi (20.2/km^{2})
- Time zone: UTC+1 (CET)
  - Summer (DST): UTC+2 (CEST)

Lohovska Brda (Serbian Cyrillic: Лоховска Брда) is a village in the municipality of Bihać, Bosnia and Herzegovina.

== Demographics ==
According to the 2013 census, its population was 154.

Ethnicity in 2013
Ethnicity	Number	Percentage
Bosniaks	107	69.5%
Serbs	40	26.0%
Croats	3	1.9%
other/undeclared	4	2.6%
Total	154	100%
