= Donja Brda =

- Village
- Location within Bosnia and Herzegovina
- Coordinates: 43°38′29″N 18°57′12″E
- Country: Bosnia and Herzegovina
- Entity: Federation of Bosnia and Herzegovina
- Canton: Bosnian-Podrinje Goražde
- Municipality: Goražde

Area
  - Total: 0.22 sq mi (0.57 km^{2})
- Elevation: 1,710 ft (520 m)

Population (2013)
  - Total: 7
  - Density: 32/sq mi (12/km^{2})
- Time zone: UTC+1 (CET)
  - Summer (DST): UTC+2 (CEST)

Donja Brda is a village in the municipality of Goražde, Bosnia and Herzegovina.

== Demographics ==
According to the 2013 census, its population was 7, all Bosniaks.
