= Brda, Radovljica =

Brda
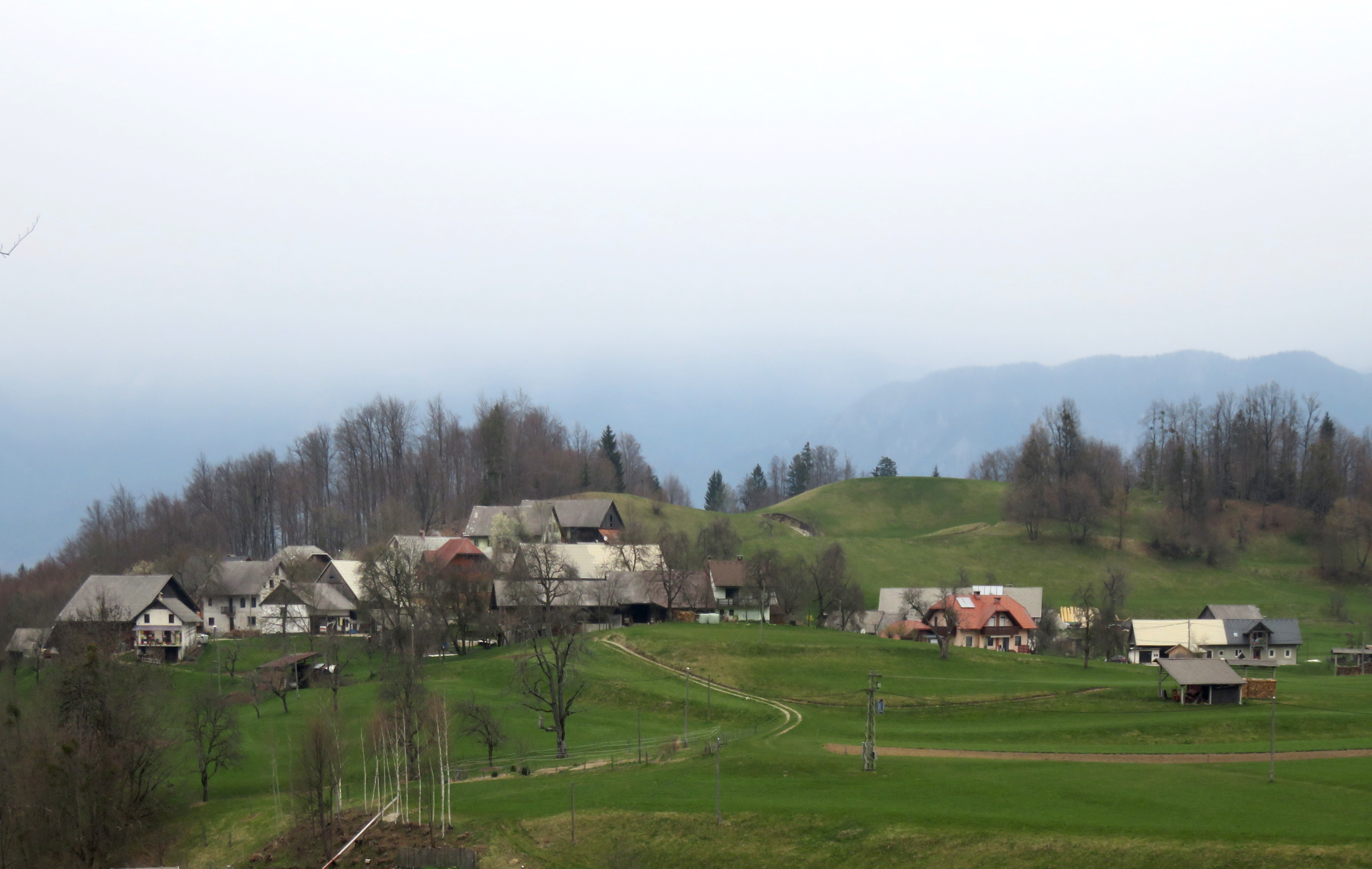

- Location in Slovenia
- Coordinates: 46°19′58″N 14°8′51″E
- Country: Slovenia
- Traditional region: Upper Carniola
- Statistical region: Upper Carniola
- Municipality: Radovljica
- Elevation: 572 m (1,877 ft)

Population (2002)
  - Total: 44

Brda (pronounced [ˈbəɾda]) is a settlement in the Municipality of Radovljica in the Upper Carniola region of Slovenia.

== Name ==
Brda was attested in written sources as Egk in 1498.

== Notable people ==
Notable people that were born or lived in Brda include the following:

- Mihael Dežman (1783–1835), Ljubljana merchant and uncle of Karl Deschmann
