= Rakitnica, Demir Hisar =

Rakitnica Ракитница
- Village
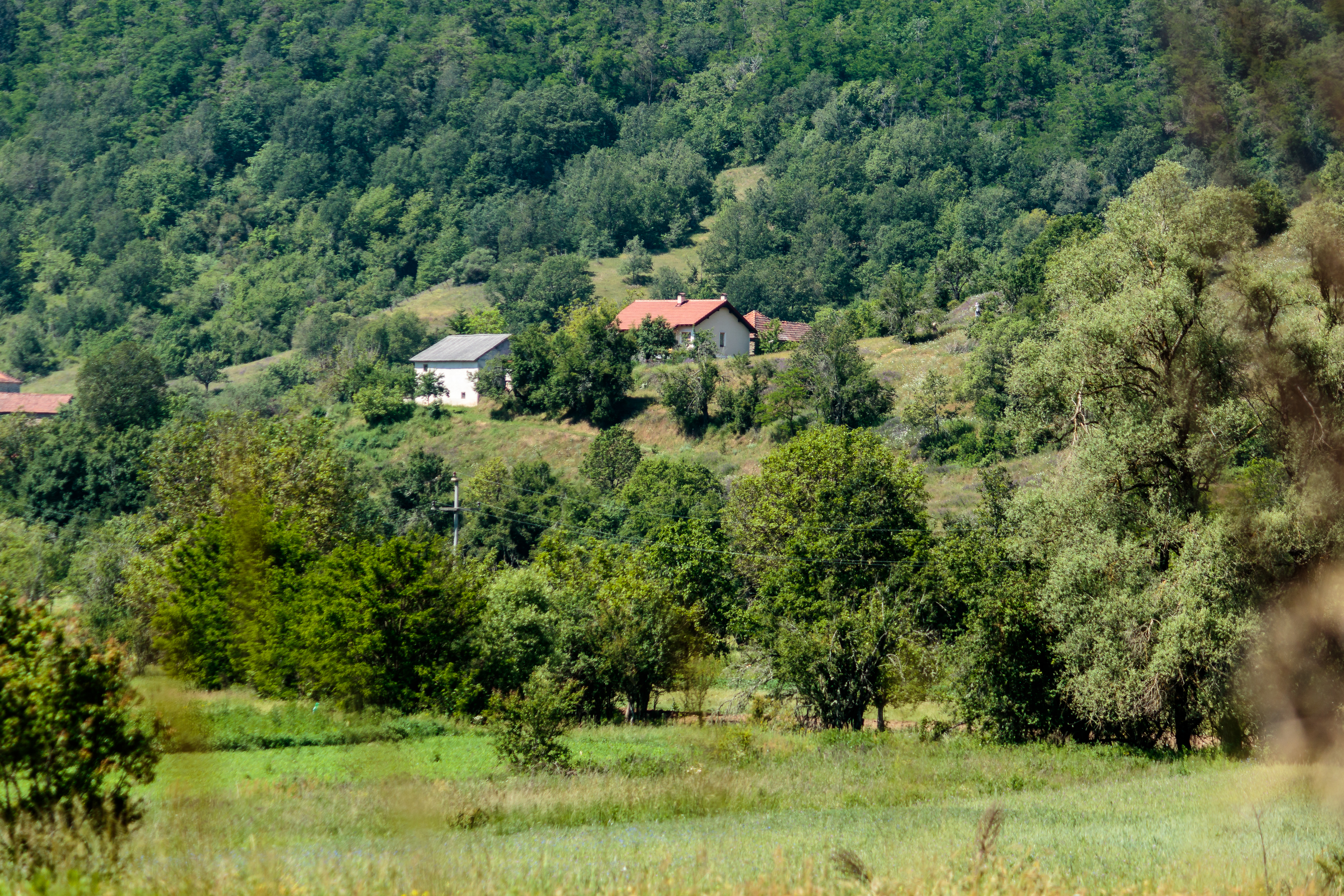

- Location within North Macedonia
- Coordinates: 41.315833°N 21.189722°E
- Country: North Macedonia
- Region: Pelagonia
- Municipality: Demir Hisar

Population (2002)
  - Total: 37
- Time zone: UTC+1 (CET)
  - Summer (DST): UTC+2 (CEST)
- Website: .

Rakitnica (Macedonian: Ракитница) is a village in the municipality of Demir Hisar, North Macedonia.

== Demographics ==
in the 1467/1468 Ottoman defter, the village had 33 households and 1 bachelor. The onomastics consisted mostly of Christian Slavic anthroponyms, with around a fifth being Albanian. In statistics gathered by Vasil Kanchov in 1900, the village of Rakitnica was inhabited by 255 Christian Bulgarians.

According to the 2002 census, the village had a total of 37 inhabitants. Ethnic groups in the village include:

- Macedonians 37
