= Brda, Vareš =

Village in Vareš, Bosnia and Herzegovina

Brda
- Village
- Location within Bosnia and Herzegovina
- Coordinates: 44.071595°N 18.273038°E
- Country: Bosnia and Herzegovina
- Entity: Federation of Bosnia and Herzegovina
- Canton: Zenica-Doboj
- Municipality: Vareš

Area
  - Total: 1.59 sq mi (4.12 km^{2})

Population (2013)
  - Total: 3
  - Density: 1.9/sq mi (0.73/km^{2})
- Time zone: UTC+1 (CET)
  - Summer (DST): UTC+2 (CEST)

Brda is a village in the municipality of Vareš, Bosnia and Herzegovina.

== Demographics ==
According to the 2013 census, its population was only 3, all Bosniaks.
