= Dujmovići =

- Village
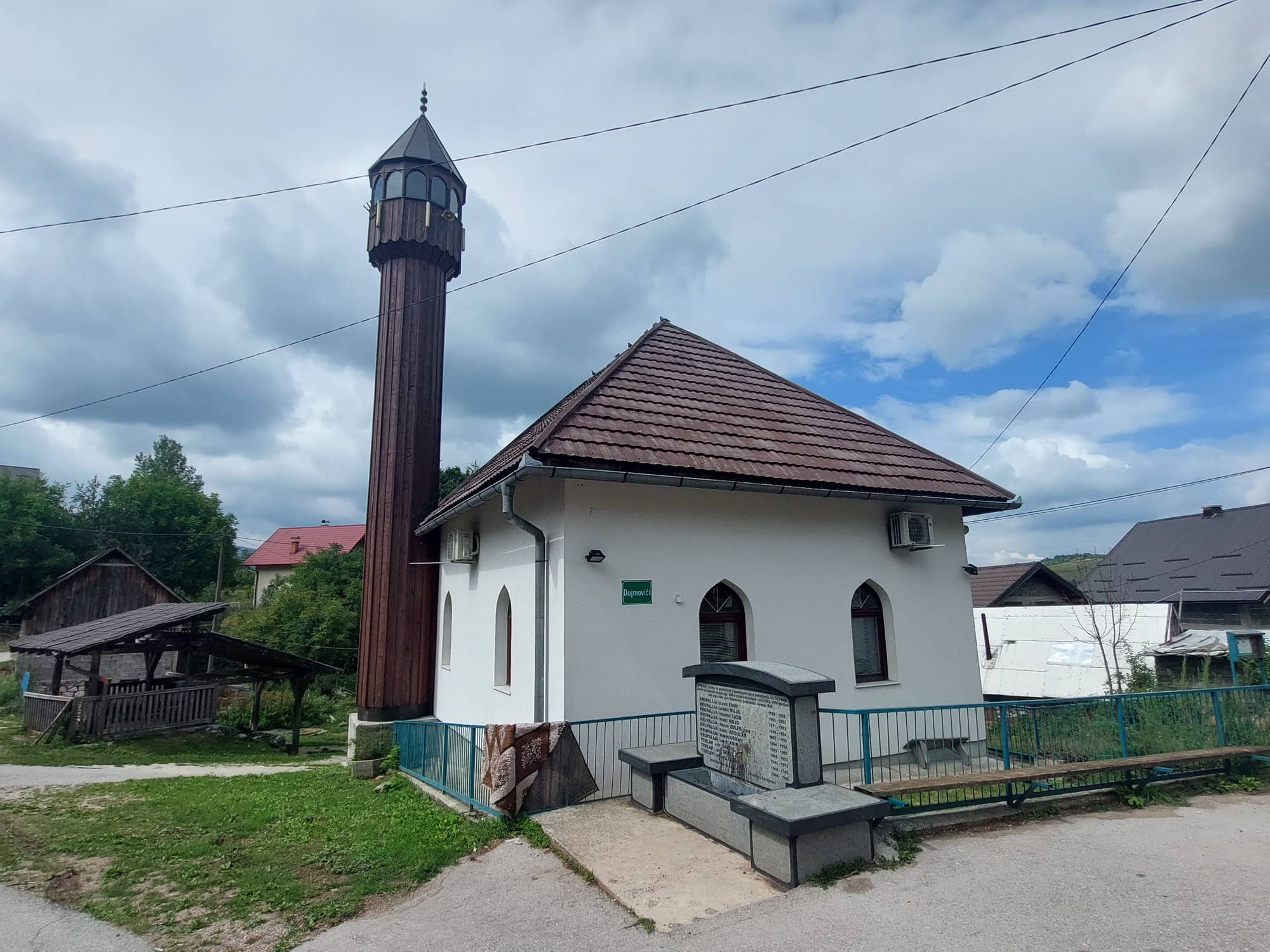

- Location within Bosnia and Herzegovina
- Coordinates: 43°39′25″N 18°21′20″E
- Country: Bosnia and Herzegovina
- Entity: Federation of Bosnia and Herzegovina
- Canton: Sarajevo
- Municipality: Trnovo

Area
  - Total: 6.25 sq mi (16.19 km^{2})

Population (2013)
  - Total: 116
  - Density: 18.6/sq mi (7.16/km^{2})
- Time zone: UTC+1 (CET)
  - Summer (DST): UTC+2 (CEST)

Dujmovići is a village in the municipality of Trnovo, Federation of BiH, Bosnia and Herzegovina.

== Demographics ==
According to the 2013 census, its population was 116, all Bosniaks.
