= Umčani, Bosnia and Herzegovina =

Umčani
- Village
- Location within Bosnia and Herzegovina
- Coordinates: 43°42′37″N 18°22′44″E
- Country: Bosnia and Herzegovina
- Entity: Federation of Bosnia and Herzegovina
- Canton: Sarajevo
- Municipality: Trnovo

Area
  - Total: 2.66 sq mi (6.90 km^{2})

Population (2013)
  - Total: 3
  - Density: 1.1/sq mi (0.43/km^{2})
- Time zone: UTC+1 (CET)
  - Summer (DST): UTC+2 (CEST)

Umčani is a village in the municipality of Trnovo, Bosnia and Herzegovina.

== Demographics ==
According to the 2013 census, its population was three, all Serbs.
