= Obla Brda =

- Village
- Location within Bosnia and Herzegovina
- Coordinates: 43°42′22″N 18°20′55″E
- Country: Bosnia and Herzegovina
- Entity: Federation of Bosnia and Herzegovina
- Canton: Sarajevo
- Municipality: Trnovo

Area
  - Total: 0.44 sq mi (1.13 km^{2})

Population (2013)
  - Total: 6
  - Density: 14/sq mi (5.3/km^{2})
- Time zone: UTC+1 (CET)
  - Summer (DST): UTC+2 (CEST)

Obla Brda is a village in the municipality of Trnovo, Bosnia and Herzegovina.

== Demographics ==
According to the 2013 census, its population was 6.

Ethnicity in 2013
Ethnicity	Number	Percentage
Serbs	5	83.3%
other/undeclared	1	16.7%
Total	6	100%
