= Brda, Velika Kladuša =

Brda
- Village
- Location within Bosnia and Herzegovina
- Coordinates: 45.145578°N 15.941825°E
- Country: Bosnia and Herzegovina
- Entity: Federation of Bosnia and Herzegovina
- Canton: Una-Sana
- Municipality: Velika Kladuša

Area
  - Total: 1.29 sq mi (3.34 km^{2})

Population (2013)
  - Total: 366
  - Density: 284/sq mi (110/km^{2})
- Time zone: UTC+1 (CET)
  - Summer (DST): UTC+2 (CEST)

Brda is a village in the municipality of Velika Kladuša, Bosnia and Herzegovina.

== Demographics ==
According to the 2013 census, its population was 366.

Ethnicity in 2013
Ethnicity	Number	Percentage
Bosniaks	350	95.6%
Croats	1	0.3%
Serbs	2	0.5%
other/undeclared	13	3.6%
Total	366	100%
