= Brda (Srebrenik) =

- Village
- Location within Bosnia and Herzegovina
- Coordinates: 44°42′22″N 18°28′07″E
- Country: Bosnia and Herzegovina
- Entity: Federation of Bosnia and Herzegovina
- Canton: Tuzla
- Municipality: Srebrenik

Area
  - Total: 0.37 sq mi (0.97 km^{2})

Population (2013)
  - Total: 654
  - Density: 1,700/sq mi (670/km^{2})

Brda is a village in Bosnia and Herzegovina. According to the 1991 census, the village is located in the municipality of Srebrenik.

== Demographics ==
According to the 2013 census, its population was 654.

Ethnicity in 2013
Ethnicity	Number	Percentage
Bosniaks	641	98.0%
other/undeclared	13	2.0%
Total	654	100%
