= Brda, Trnovo =

Brda Брда
- Village
- Location within Bosnia and Herzegovina
- Coordinates: 43°40′17″N 18°15′11″E
- Country: Bosnia and Herzegovina
- Entity: Federation of Bosnia and Herzegovina
- Canton: Sarajevo
- Municipality: Trnovo

Area
  - Total: 3.07 sq mi (7.95 km^{2})

Population (2013)
  - Total: 48
  - Density: 16/sq mi (6.0/km^{2})
- Time zone: UTC+1 (CET)
  - Summer (DST): UTC+2 (CEST)

Brda is a village in the municipality of Trnovo, Bosnia and Herzegovina.

== Demographics ==
According to the 2013 census, its population was 48, all Bosniaks.
