= Turovi =

Coordinates: 43°39′N 18°25′E

Turovi Турови
- Village
- Location within Bosnia and Herzegovina
- Country: Bosnia and Herzegovina
- Entity: Republika Srpska
- Municipality: Trnovo
- Time zone: UTC+1 (CET)
  - Summer (DST): UTC+2 (CEST)

Turovi (Serbian Cyrillic: Турови) is a village in Trnovo municipality, Istočno Sarajevo, Bosnia and Herzegovina.
