= Dejčići =

- Village
- Location within Bosnia and Herzegovina
- Coordinates: 43°41′N 18°20′E
- Country: Bosnia and Herzegovina
- Entity: Federation of Bosnia and Herzegovina
- Canton: Sarajevo
- Municipality: Trnovo

Area
  - Total: 3.43 sq mi (8.89 km^{2})

Population (2013)
  - Total: 160
  - Density: 47/sq mi (18/km^{2})
- Time zone: UTC+1 (CET)
  - Summer (DST): UTC+2 (CEST)

Dejčići is a village and a seat of Trnovo municipality, Sarajevo Canton, Federation BiH, Bosnia and Herzegovina.

== Demographics ==
According to the 2013 census, its population was 160, all Bosniaks.
