= Prečani (village) =

- Village
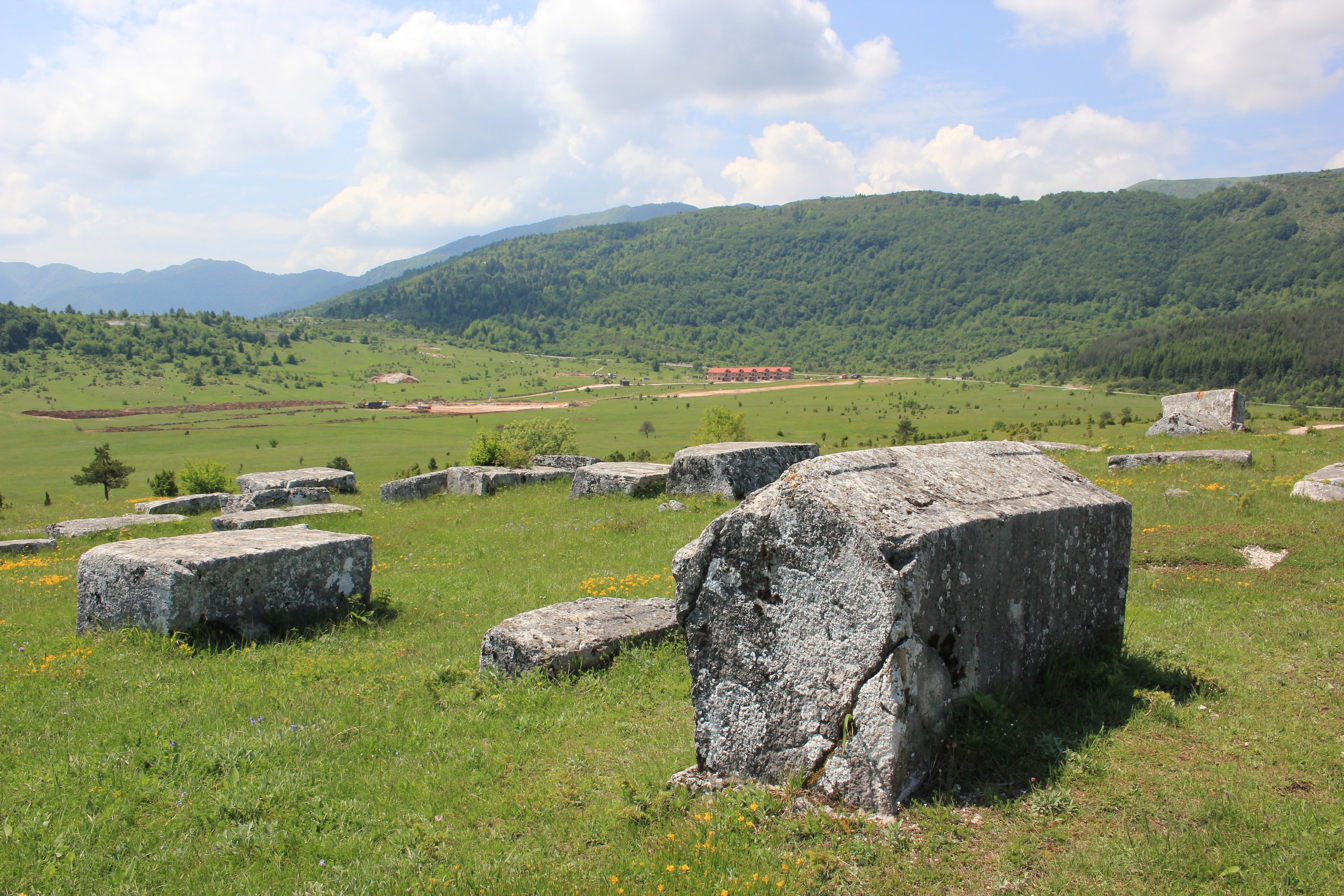
- Kaursko necropolis near Dejčići, Bosnia.

- Location within Bosnia and Herzegovina
- Coordinates: 43°42′41″N 18°20′55″E
- Country: Bosnia and Herzegovina
- Entity: Federation of Bosnia and Herzegovina
- Canton: Sarajevo
- Municipality: Trnovo

Area
  - Total: 0.83 sq mi (2.16 km^{2})

Population (2013)
  - Total: 1
  - Density: 1.2/sq mi (0.46/km^{2})
- Time zone: UTC+1 (CET)
  - Summer (DST): UTC+2 (CEST)

Prečani is an uninhabited village in the municipality of Trnovo, Federation of Bosnia and Herzegovina, Bosnia and Herzegovina.

== Demographics ==
According to the 2013 census, its population was just 1, a Serb.
