= Trnovo, Federation of Bosnia and Herzegovina =

Coordinates: 43°41′19″N 18°20′23″E

Trnovo
- Town and municipality
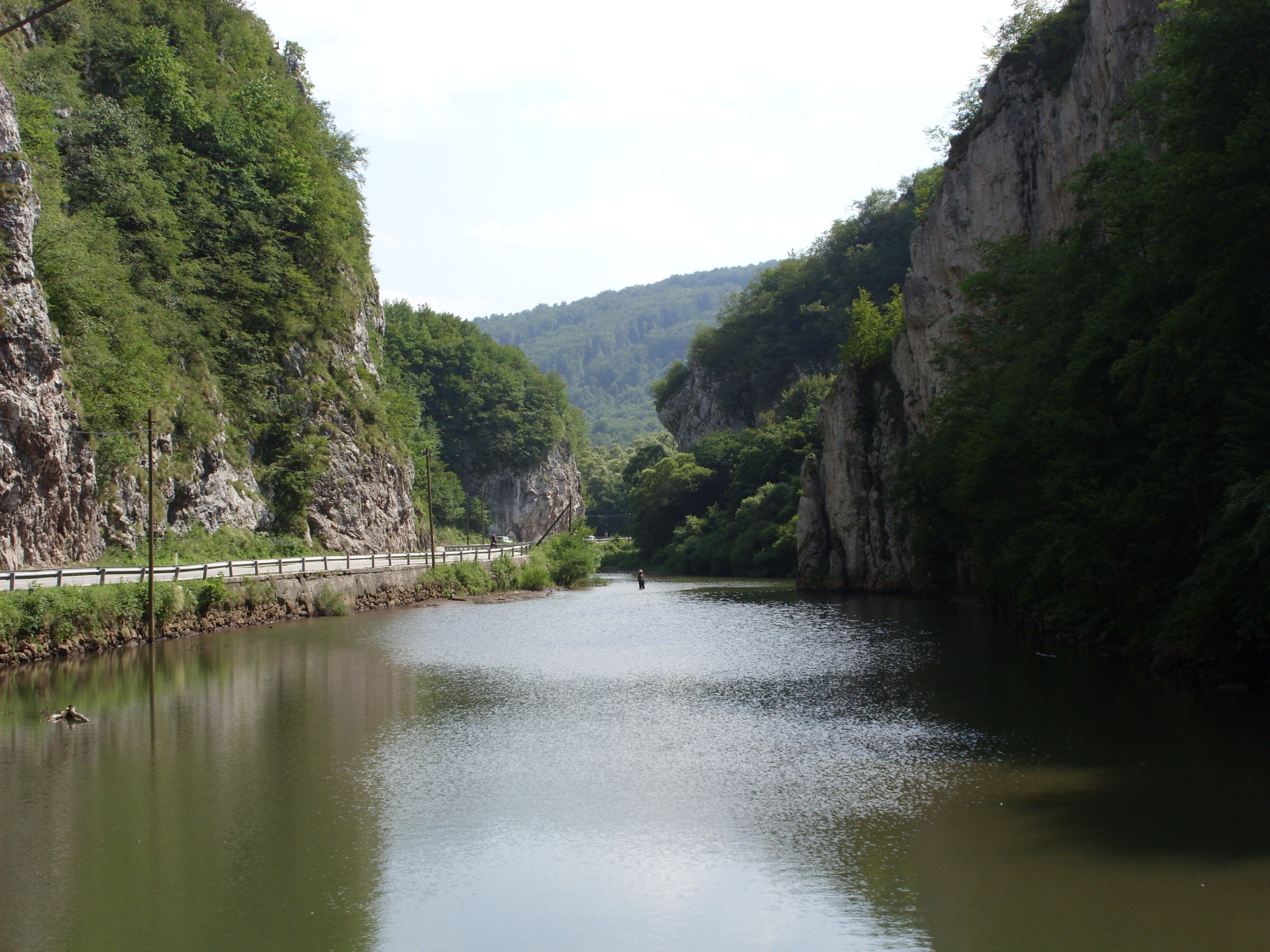
- View on the Željeznica river.

- Seal

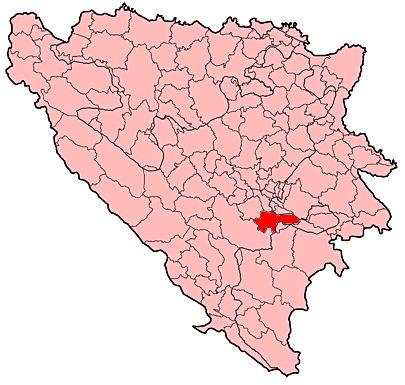
- Location of Trnovo, Federation of Bosnia and Herzegovina within Bosnia and Herzegovina.
- Country: Bosnia and Herzegovina
- Entity: Federation of Bosnia and Herzegovina
- Canton: Sarajevo Canton

Government
  - Municipal mayor: Ibro Berilo (SDA)

Area
  - Total: 340.08 km^{2} (131.31 sq mi)

Population (2013 census)
  - Total: 1,502
  - Density: 54/km^{2} (140/sq mi)
- Time zone: UTC+1 (CET)
  - Summer (DST): UTC+2 (CEST)
- Area code: +387 33
- Website: www.trnovo.ba

Trnovo is a town and municipality located in Sarajevo Canton of the Federation of Bosnia and Herzegovina, an entity of Bosnia and Herzegovina. As of 2013, the municipality had a population of 1,502 inhabitants. The town itself had a total population of 1,023, with 956 of them living in the Republika Srpska part and 67 in the Federation part.

It is located 30 kilometers southeast of the city of Sarajevo. As a result of the 1995 Dayton Agreement, the municipality was divided between the Federation of Bosnia and Herzegovina and Republika Srpska (Trnovo, RS).

== Settlements ==
Aside from the town of Trnovo, the municipality include the following settlements:

- Balbašići
- Bobovica
- Brda
- Brutusi
- Čeružići
- Češina Strana
- Čunčići
- Dejčići
- Delijaš
- Deseci
- Dujmovići
- Durakovići
- Godinja
- Gornja Presjenica
- Hamzići
- Jelačići
- Karovići
- Kramari
- Krsmanići
- Ledići
- Lisovići
- Lukavac
- Mađari
- Mijanovići
- Obla Brda
- Ostojići
- Pendičići
- Pomenovići
- Prečani
- Rakitnica
- Rijeka
- Sjeverovići
- Šabanci
- Šabići
- Šišići
- Trebečaj
- Tušila
- Umčani
- Umoljani
- Zagor

== Demographics ==
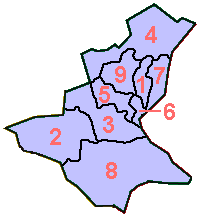
Trnovo is marked with number 8 on this map of the Sarajevo Canton.

The pre-war municipality, with 63 settlements, had a total population of 6,991 people, of whom Bosniaks were 68.81% and Serbs 29.45%. The Bosniak-inhabited settlements became part of the Trnovo municipality of the Federation of Bosnia and Herzegovina. According to data from the municipality, it is the least populous municipality in the Sarajevo Canton, with a population of 1,830. It is also the least densely populated of the nine municipalities, and has the highest percentage of people over 65 years of age.

Ethnically, 95.4% of residents are Bosniaks and 4.6% are Serbs, and this accounts for the entire population.

== Tourism ==
Large sections of the mountains of Igman, Bjelašnica, Visočica, Treskavica and Jahorina, along with a section of the stunning Rakitnica canyon are located on the municipality territory, offering possibilities for sustainable tourism development. However, the main focus of growing criticism is rather this precise aspect of ignoring sustainable development. The problem of mismanagement and corruption in urban planning and decision making, with complete disregard of environmental standards and practices, followed with inherent lack of environmental consciousness and concerns for nature's balance and heritage within the political sphere of influence, clears the way for commodification, which consequently lead to overdevelopment and intention to bring infrastructure, that might be unwarrantable and excessive in scale and scope, deep into preserved and undisturbed areals of high-valued nature with potential for statuary protection, which consequently results in environmental degradation. Whereas agriculture and especially traditional livestock, husbandry and sheepherding had always been local trade of choice, and along with reasonable and sustainable tourism development, could still remain the main branch of the local economy.

== Notable people ==
- Suvad Katana, footballer (1969–2005)

== See also ==
- Sarajevo
- Sarajevo Canton
