= Jablanica =

Jablanica (Serbian Cyrillic: Јабланица, Macedonian: Јабланица) is a common South Slavic toponym, derived from jablan, "Lombardy poplar", literally meaning "place of lombardy poplar". It may refer to:

== Albania ==
- Jablanica Mountain, in eastern Albania and the west of the Republic of Macedonia

== Bosnia and Herzegovina ==
- Jablanica, Bosnia and Herzegovina, a town and municipality in Herzegovina
- Jablanica, Gradiška
- Jablanica, Lopare, a village in Republika Srpska
- Jablanica (Maglaj), a village in Maglaj municipality
- Jablanica, Tešanj
- Jablanica, Trnovo
- Jablanica (Višegrad)

== Kosovo ==
- Jablanica, Kosovo, a village - see List of populated places in Kosovo by municipality

== North Macedonia ==
- Jablanica, Struga, a village in Struga Municipality
- Jablanica Mountain, in western Macedonia and the east of Albania

== Montenegro ==
- Jablanica, Rožaje, a village in Rožaje Municipality

== Serbia ==
- Jablanica (river), in southern Serbia
- Jablanica District, in southern Serbia
- Jablanica, Gornji Milanovac, settlement
- Jablanica, Boljevac, settlement
- Jablanica, Bujanovac, settlement
- Jablanica, Kruševac, settlement
- Jablanica, Novi Pazar, settlement
- Jablanica, Tutin, settlement
- Jablanica, Čajetina, settlement

== Slovenia ==
- Jablanica, Ilirska Bistrica, a settlement in the Municipality of Ilirska Bistrica
- Jablanica, Sevnica, a settlement in the Municipality of Sevnica
- Spodnja Jablanica, a settlement in the Municipality of Šmartno pri Litiji
- Zgornja Jablanica, a settlement in the Municipality of Šmartno pri Litiji

== See also ==
- Yablanitsa, a town in Lovech Province, Bulgaria
- Jablanac, village in Croatia (same toponymic origin)
