= Yeni Imaret Bridge =

Bridge in Edirne, Turkey

Yeni Imaret Bridge (Turkish: Yeni İmaret Köprüsü) is a historic Ottoman bridge in Edirne, Turkey. It crosses the Tunca.

The bridge has six arches, and was constructed between 1484 and 1488 by the architect Hayruddin while he was constructing the Bayezid II Complex for the Ottoman sultan Bayezid II (r. 1481–1512).
