= Slobodan Praljak =

Bosnian Croat military commander (1945–2017)

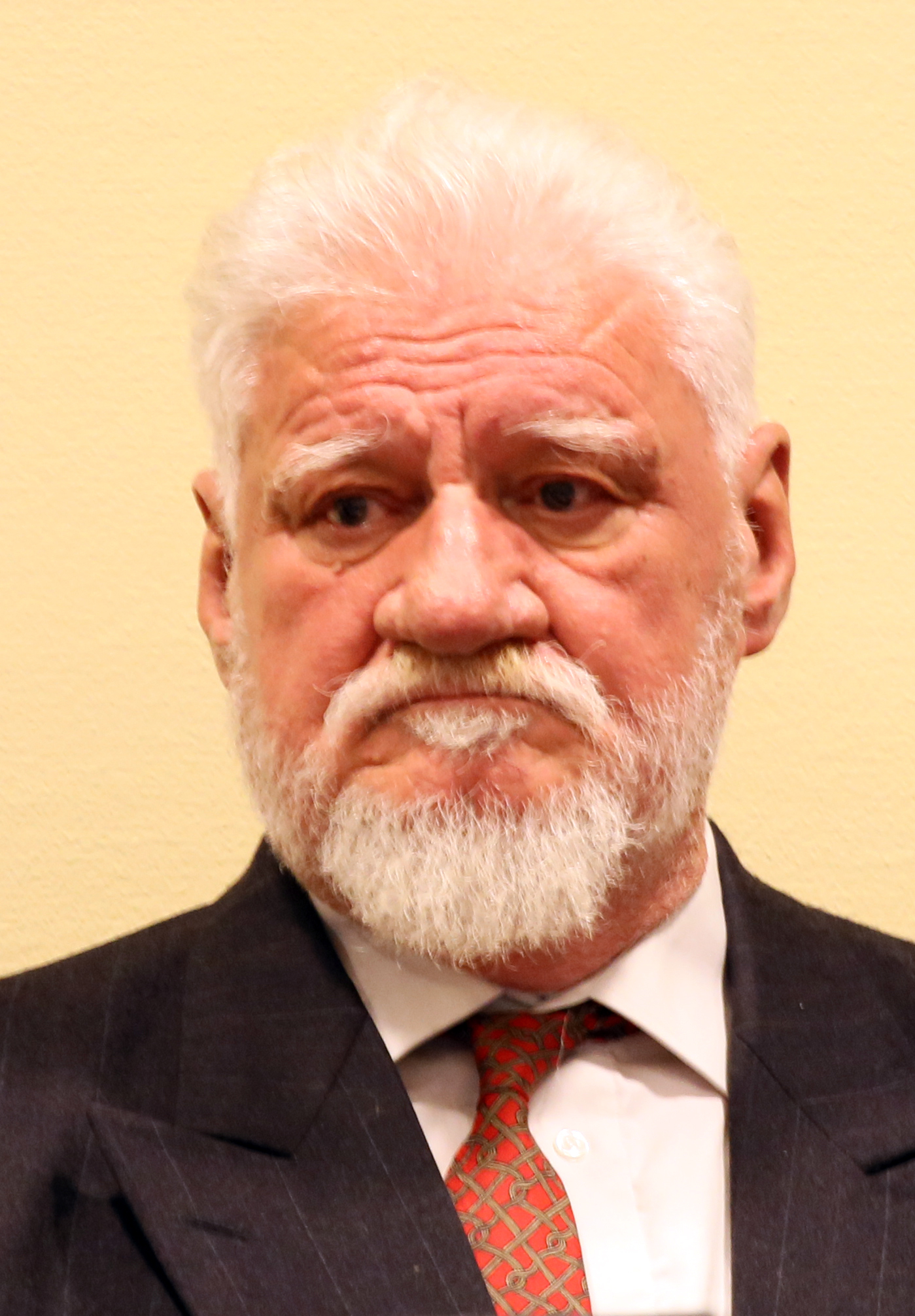
- Praljak in 2017
- Born: 2 January 1945; Čapljina, Independent State of Croatia
- Died: 29 November 2017 (aged 72); The Hague, Netherlands
- Cause of death: Suicide by cyanide poisoning
- Burial place: Cremated in Zagreb, Croatia
- Spouse: Kaćuša Babić
- Military career
- Allegiance: Croatia; Herzeg-Bosnia
- Branch: Croatian Army; Croatian Defence Council
- Service years: 1991–1995
- Rank: General
- Conflicts: Croatian War of Independence; Bosnian War; Croat–Bosniak War
- Other work: Professor, film and theatre director, businessman, writer

Slobodan Praljak (Croatian pronunciation: [slobǒdan prǎːʎak]; 2 January 1945 – 29 November 2017) was a Bosnian Croat general found guilty by the International Criminal Tribunal for the former Yugoslavia (ICTY) of committing violations of the laws of war, crimes against humanity, and breaches of the Geneva Conventions during the 1992–1994 Croat–Bosniak War.

Praljak voluntarily joined the newly formed Croatian Armed Forces after the outbreak of the Croatian War of Independence in 1991. Before and after the war he was an engineer, a television and theatre director, and a businessman. Praljak was indicted by, and voluntarily surrendered to, the ICTY in 2004. In 2013, he was convicted for war crimes against the Bosniak population during the Croat–Bosniak War alongside five other Bosnian Croat officials, and was sentenced to 20 years in jail (minus the time he had already spent in detention). Upon hearing the guilty verdict upheld in November 2017, Praljak stated that he rejected the verdict of the court, and fatally poisoned himself by drinking cyanide in the courtroom.

== Early life and career ==
Slobodan Praljak was born on 2 January 1945 in Čapljina, Independent State of Croatia (modern Bosnia and Herzegovina). His father Mirko worked for the security agency OZNA. Praljak attended high school in Široki Brijeg with the future Croatian Defence Minister Gojko Šušak.

Praljak held three university degrees. In 1970, he graduated as an electrical engineer at the Faculty of Electrical Engineering in Zagreb with a GPA of 4.5/5. In 1971, he graduated from the Zagreb Faculty of Humanities and Social Sciences, majoring in philosophy and sociology. In 1972, Praljak graduated from the Zagreb Academy of Dramatic Art.

At first, Praljak worked as a professor and manager of the electronics laboratory at the Nikola Tesla Vocational High School in Zagreb, then lectured on philosophy and sociology, and after 1973 was a freelance artist. Praljak was also a theatre director in theatres in Zagreb, Osijek and Mostar. He directed the television series Blesan i Tulipan (Blesan and Tulipan), television dramas Novela od Stanca (Prank for Stanac) and Sargaško more (Sargasso Sea), documentaries Smrt psa (Death of a Dog, 1980), Sandžak (Sanjak, 1990) and Duhan (Tobacco, 1990), and film Povratak Katarine Kožul (Return of Katarina Kožul, 1989).

== Military activity ==
Praljak drew public attention in September 1991 when he voluntarily joined the newly formed Croatian Armed Forces after the outbreak of the Croatian War of Independence. He formed a unit composed of the Zagreb artists and intellectuals with whom he held positions in Sunja. After the Sarajevo Agreement, by 3 April 1992, he was made major general, received a number of responsibilities in the Ministry of Defence, and became one of the 14 members of the Croatian National Defence Council and a member of the Croatian State Commission for Relations with United Nations Protection Force (UNPROFOR). He was the High Representative of the Ministry of Defence, and since 13 May 1993, representative of the Ministry of Defence in the Croatian Republic of Herzeg-Bosnia and Croatian Defence Council (HVO). Praljak petitioned Alija Izetbegović to unblock Sarajevo but his propositions were rejected. From 24 July to 8 November 1993, Praljak was the Chief of Staff of the Croatian Defence Council. In spite of the conflict between Croats and Bosniaks in the Croat–Bosniak War, he sent a truck full of weapons to besieged Sarajevo to help Bosniaks. He also allowed the UNHCR's humanitarian convoy through to Mostar, which had been stopped in Čitluk.

Praljak was accused of failing to prevent the armed forces from committing many crimes of which he was informed and that he could foresee, including removing and placing in detention the Bosniaks population of Prozor from July to August 1993, murders in Mostar municipality, the destruction of buildings in east Mostar (including the mosques and the Old Bridge), attacking and wounding of members of international organisations, the destruction and looting of property in Gornji Vakuf in January 1993, Raštani in August 1993, and Stupni Do in October 1993. During 1993, General Praljak was in charge of the Dretelj camp where Bosniak men were brutalized, starved, and some killed.

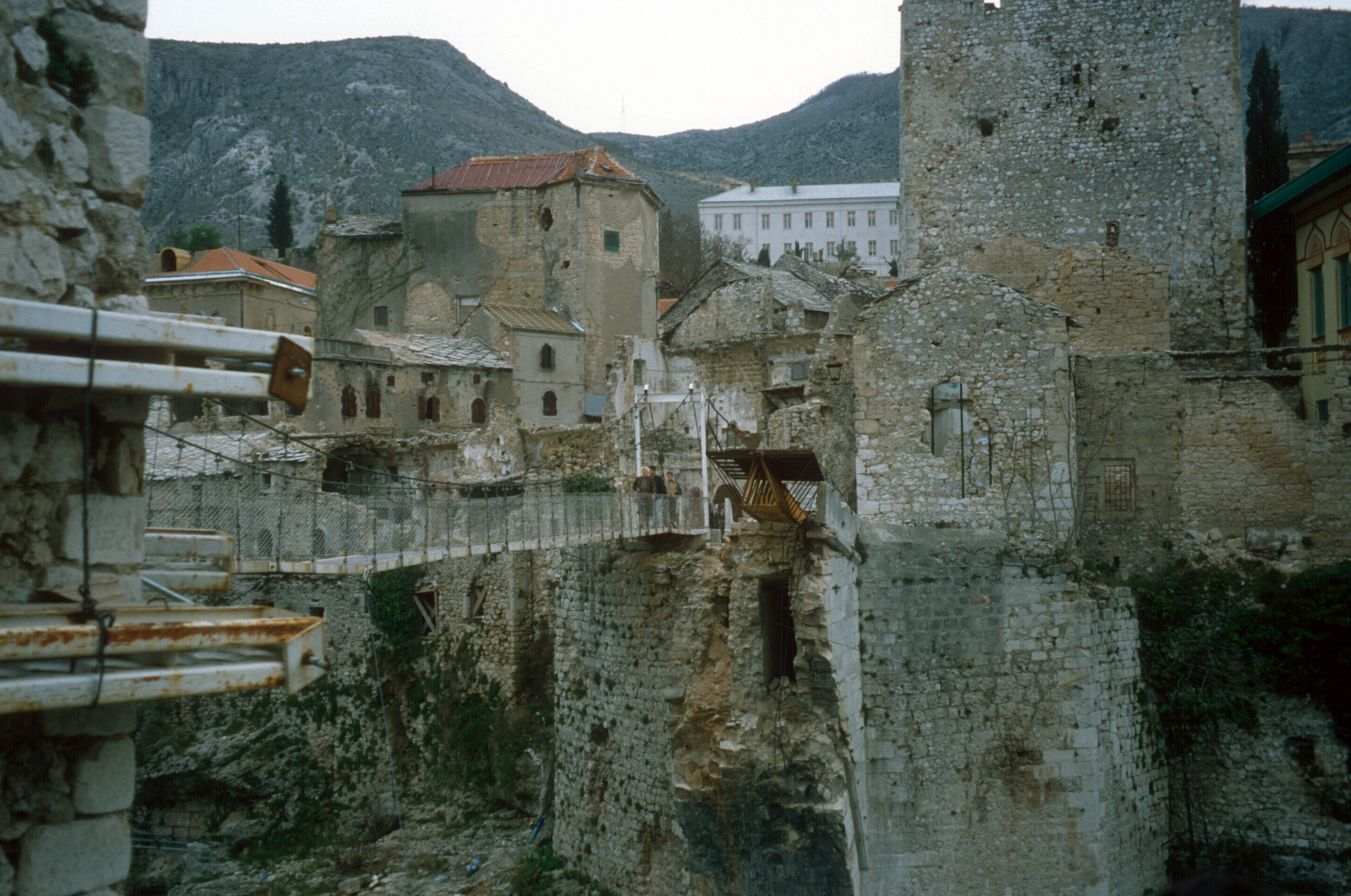
The temporary bridge in place of the Old Bridge post deconstruction, 1997

Praljak was accused of ordering the destruction of Mostar's Old Bridge in November 1993, an act which ICTY ruled had "caused disproportionate damage to the Muslim civilian population". However, ICTY agreed that the bridge was a legitimate military target. During the trial, Praljak denied the accusation because in the same month when the destruction occurred, he came into conflict with the commander of the HVO's so-called "Convicts' Battalion", Mladen Naletilić Tuta which resulted in his resignation from the positions of HVO's Chief of Staff, one day before the destruction of the bridge. He said that the bridge was demolished by activation of the explosive charge set on the left bank of the Neretva, where the Army of Bosnia and Herzegovina was located. In addition to the responsibility and whether it was a legitimate military target, ICTY also examined whether the earlier siege by JNA and Bosnian Serb forces contributed to the bridge's collapse. Praljak retired from military service at his own request on 1 December 1995.

== Postwar career ==
After the war, Praljak became a businessman. In 1995, Praljak co-founded a company with his brother Zoran called Oktavijan. His company initially produced films, video, and television programs and published Praljak's books. It later engaged in real estate business by managing a business complex Centar 2000 in Zagreb. Since 2005, the company is owned and managed by his stepson Nikola Babić Praljak. In 2011 it had around 22 million kunas of revenue. Praljak was also a co-owner of Liberan, a company that has a share in Ljubuški Tobacco Factory, and owned other shares in few other companies. In 2008, the Croatian Ministry of Culture deemed that 18 of his works about the Croatian War of Independence, Bosnian War, and relations between Croatia and Bosnia and Herzegovina were not books but brochures of worthless literature, and in 2013 the Ministry of Finance made an enforcement charge of 435 thousand kunas. In total, he authored 25 works. Since 2012, the Hague Tribunal's secretariat requested Praljak to recover defence costs of around €2.8–3.3 million, as they estimated that he had assets and shares worth €6.5 million which allowed him to fund the costs of his defence. Praljak and his lawyer refused the estimation statement because he had no property in his name even from the beginning of the trial.

== ICTY indictment ==
Praljak was among six accused by the International Criminal Tribunal for the former Yugoslavia (ICTY), in relation to the Croatian Republic of Herzeg-Bosnia. On 5 April 2004, he voluntarily surrendered and was transferred to the ICTY. In his indictment it was alleged that Praljak as a senior military official commanded, directly and indirectly, the Herzeg-Bosnia/HVO armed forces which committed mass war crimes against Bosnian Muslim population in eight municipalities in Bosnia and Herzegovina during a joint criminal enterprise between 1992 and 1994. In his role as a high-ranking official in the Ministry of Defence, he was closely involved in all aspects of not only the Herzeg-Bosnia/HVO military planning and operations but the actions of the Herzeg-Bosnia/HVO civilian police too. On 6 April, he appeared before ICTY and pleaded not guilty. He chose to defend himself without a lawyer.

The indictment charged on the basis of their individual and superior criminal responsibility, but subsequently in judgment only on the basis of individual criminal responsibility. Praljak was found guilty on (taken from the UN press release 2004, 2017):

- four counts of grave breaches of the Geneva Conventions (willful killing; unlawful deportation, transfer and confinement of a civilian; inhuman treatment; extensive destruction of property and appropriation of property, not justified by military necessity and carried out unlawfully and wantonly).
- six counts of violations of the laws or customs of war (cruel treatment; unlawful labour; destruction or wilful damage done to institutions dedicated to religion or education; plunder of public or private property; unlawful attack on civilians; unlawful infliction of terror on civilians)
- five counts of crimes against humanity (persecutions on political, racial and religious grounds; murder; deportation; imprisonment; inhumane acts)

The trial began on 26 April 2006. On 29 May 2013, the Trial Chamber judgement sentenced him to 20 years of imprisonment (the sentence took into account the time he had already spent in detention), and on 28 June 2013, Praljak filed an appeal. On 29 November 2017, the ICTY trial was concluded finding him guilty, and although some parts of his conviction were overturned, the judge did not reduce the initial sentence of 20 years. He was charged with crimes against "humanity, violations of the laws or customs of war, and grave breaches of the Geneva Conventions", also "extensive appropriation of property not justified by military necessity" and "plunder of public or private property through the third category of joint criminal enterprise liability", on which given his command responsibility he failed to act and prevent. He was acquitted of some charges related to the destruction of the Old Bridge. As he had already served more than two-thirds of the sentence in jail (around 13 years and several months), he would probably have been released soon.

== Death ==
External videos
- War Criminal Dies After Drinking 'Poison' In Court After Judge Confirmed 20-Year Sentence – TIME, YouTube video

On 29 November 2017, during the pronouncement of the appeal judgment against him, Praljak addressed the judges, saying: "Judges, Slobodan Praljak is not a war criminal. With disdain, I reject your verdict!" He then drank what he said was poison, leading presiding judge Carmel Agius to suspend the hearings. ICTY medical staff transported Praljak to nearby HMC Hospital, where he died. The Dutch authorities declared the courtroom a crime scene and launched an investigation. His body was cremated in Zagreb in a private ceremony.

=== Reaction ===
Former ICTY judges Wolfgang Schomburg and Richard Goldstone commented that "it is a tragedy that someone in such a situation has taken their own life". Goldstone added: "In a way, the victims are deprived of this deed. They did not get full justice." Martin Bell described Praljak as a "theatrical character" who "died in a theatrical way". Andrey Shary for Radio Free Europe/Radio Liberty noted that "Praljak's samurai final act might evoke respect or sympathy", but "individual perceptions of honor don't always coincide with correctness".

Writing in The Daily Telegraph, journalist Harry de Quetteville opined that the defiant suicide was "the most dramatic proof possible of a very uncomfortable reality: many in the Balkans refuse to accept that the horrific ethnic cleansing of the 1990s was wrong". Former US Ambassador for War Crimes Issues Stephen Rapp compared Praljak's suicide by poisoning to that of another war crimes convict, Hermann Göring, noting that in both cases the verdict nevertheless "stands for all history in establishing the facts and in showing that the perpetrators of atrocities will be held to account". Praljak, like Göring, just managed to thwart the due process of law at its climax.

The Government of Croatia offered condolences to Praljak's family and said the ICTY misrepresented its officials in the 1990s. Prime Minister Andrej Plenković stated that Praljak's suicide illustrated the "deep moral injustice towards the six Croats from Bosnia and Herzegovina and the Croatian people". All the party caucuses of the Croatian Parliament except the Social Democratic Party and Civic Liberal Alliance issued a joint statement declaring that ICTY's verdict did not respect the "historical truths, facts and evidence", and that it was "unjust and unacceptable", adding that Praljak symbolically warned of all the verdicts' injustice with his suicide. They expressed their condolences to the families of victims of crimes committed during the Bosnian War. Croatian president Kolinda Grabar-Kitarović expressed her condolences to Praljak's family, calling him "a man who preferred to die rather than live as a convict for crimes he did not commit". Miroslav Tuđman stated it was a "consequence of his moral position not to accept the verdict that has nothing to do with justice or reality".

The Bosniak member of the Presidency of Bosnia and Herzegovina, Bakir Izetbegović, said that Praljak was led to suicide by the joint criminal enterprise, while the Croat member and Chairman Dragan Čović stated that Praljak had sacrificed his life to prove his innocence. Serbian president Aleksandar Vučić said he would not mock Praljak's suicide but has criticized the reaction of Croatian officials, stating that it would have been unacceptable for him to praise a convicted war criminal as a hero or to denounce an ICTY verdict. The Serbian politician Vojislav Šešelj commented that, although he was an enemy, it was a "heroic move worthy of respect" and there should have been more such strong blows to the tribunal.

Almost a thousand Herzegovinian Croats gathered in the Mostar and Čapljina squares to light candles to pay respect to Praljak. On 11 December 2017, a commemoration for Slobodan Praljak was held in Zagreb. The event was attended by two thousand people, including Government ministers Damir Krstičević and Tomo Medved (as private citizens), a number of MPs, mostly from the Croatian Democratic Union party, and some retired army officers that participated in the 1990s war. In the evening, a religious ceremony was also held at a Catholic church. During the same day, members of the Youth Initiative for Human Rights made a commemoration for the victims of Croatian forces urging condemnation of that period policies.

President Grabar-Kitarović has been pressured to take away wartime decorations from Praljak and other convicted officials, but she refused to do so stating that they received it for "defence against Serbian aggression", adding that "such practice has not been implemented so far, except in the case of verdicts made by the Croatian courts".

=== Investigation ===
A preliminary autopsy determined that Praljak was poisoned by potassium cyanide, which caused heart failure. How the poison was obtained and brought into the courtroom was to be the subject of an official investigation. Praljak's lawyer Nika Pinter suggested that he may have committed suicide because he could not accept being convicted as a war criminal and that the act had long been planned.

The cyanide that Praljak took was not listed as a prohibited substance under Dutch law. In November 2018 Dutch authorities revealed that their investigation failed to establish how the cyanide was smuggled inside. "With regards to the investigation concerning assistance in the commission of suicide, the Dutch authorities conducted a thorough investigation of how Praljak could get hold of the cyanide. Witnesses were interviewed, video materials watched, rooms in which Praljak stayed were checked and numerous materials inspected. However, no information was found concerning the question on how Praljak came into possession of that substance", the prosecutors' report said. The report added that video surveillance recordings did not show if Praljak carried the vial of poison with him or if it was handed to him.

== Personal life ==
Praljak married Kaćuša Babić, the former wife of his close friend and poet Goran Babić. The couple had no children, but Praljak was close to his stepchildren, Nataša and Nikola, the latter adding the last name Praljak to his birth name.

== See also ==
- Joint criminal enterprise
- Malevo Ferreyra, Argentinian police chief accused of crimes against humanity during the Dirty War who fatally shot himself during a news interview while police attempted to arrest him.
