= Mladen Naletilić Tuta =

Bosnian Croat soldier (1946–2021)

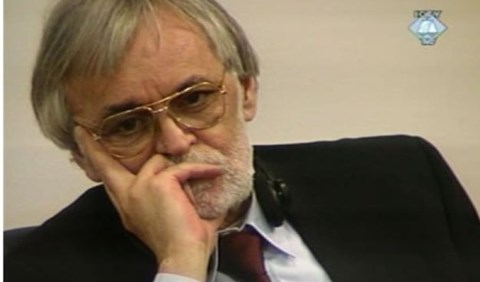

Personal details
- Born: 1 December 1946 Široki Brijeg, PR Bosnia and Herzegovina, FPR Yugoslavia
- Died: 17 December 2021 (aged 75) Mostar, Bosnia and Herzegovina
- Resting place: Široki Brijeg, Bosnia and Herzegovina
- Nickname: Tuta

Military service
- Allegiance: Croatian National Guard Croatian Defence Council
- Years of service: 1991–1995
- Rank: Commander
- Unit: Široki Brijeg Convicts' Battalion
- Battles/wars: Bosnian War; Operation Jackal; Croat-Bosniak War; Siege of Mostar; Battle of Sovići and Doljani; Operation Tvigi 94

Mladen Naletilić (1 December 1946 – 17 December 2021) was a Bosnian Croat paramilitary commander of the "Convicts' Battalion" (Croatian: “Kažnjenička Bojna”) of the Croatian Defence Council (HVO) convicted for war crimes by the ICTY.

== Biography ==
Naletilić was born in Široki Brijeg in Bosnia and Herzegovina. In his youth, Naletilić went to West Germany under Yugoslavian program of temporary work abroad with the "United Croats of Germany", a Croat emigration agency. He ran a casino in Singen, and, according to Miroslav Tuđman, Naletilić was also a pimp.

He cooperated with Bundesnachrichtendienst, a German intelligence agency, and the Bulgarian Committee for State Security.

In 1990 he returned to Croatia and in 1991 he founded a volunteer unit and named it the "Convicts' Battalion" (Croatian: Kažnjenička bojna). In 1992 when Bosnian War started, "Convicts' Battalion" was replaced in Široki Brijeg (former Lištica) and they operated in Herzegovina. Members of the unit included foreign volunteers such as Germans, the British, the French, Swedes, Paraguayans and Argentines.

As part of the Croatian Defence Council ("Convicts' Battalion"), he fought against Yugoslav People's Army (JNA) and Army of Republika Srpska (VRS). He was his unit's commander, under general Ivan Andabak. He was a close friend of then-Croatian Minister of Defence Gojko Šušak. On 2 August 1992, Naletilić ordered his unit to assassinate Blaž Kraljević, general of the Croatian Defence Forces and general of the Army of Bosnia and Herzegovina (ARBiH), along with eight of Kraljević's staff. Naletilić rewarded twenty of the men in the unit with 5,000 Deutschmarks each. Kraljević had opposed attempts by Croatian president Franjo Tuđman and his Croatian Democratic Union (HDZ) party, as well as Mate Boban and Radovan Karadžić to divide Bosnia and Herzegovina.

In 1993 Jusuf Prazina joined Naletilić's unit. He was one of the organizers of the defence of Sarajevo and also a criminal. When the Croat-Bosniak War broke out in 1992, "Convicts' Battalion" fought against ARBiH in Jablanica, Doljani and Vakuf. On 17 April 1993, his unit attacked the village of Sovići and conducted forcible transfer of Bosniaks. On 9 May 1993, members of the "Convicts' Battalion" were involved in the siege of eastern Mostar.

In November 1993, Naletilić was in personal conflict with general Slobodan Praljak of the HVO and thus reportedly forced to leave his post as Chief of Staff of the HVO. In 1994, Naletilić opposed the truce between Croats and Bosniaks and also opposed the abolition of Croatian Republic of Herzeg-Bosnia, an unrecognized entity of Bosnia and Herzegovina, bitterly accusing Gojko Šušak and Franjo Tuđman of treason.

After the war ended, he left the army. In 1997, he was arrested and convicted of the murder of Robert Nosić, a military policeman and member of Croatian Defence Forces from Ljubuški. Naletilić spent two years in Remetinec prison. Due to health problems he was transferred to University Hospital Centre Zagreb on 14 November 1999. In March 2000, Naletilić was extradited to the ICTY in the Hague, and convicted and sentenced to 20 years in prison for war crimes during the Croat-Bosniak War. On 24 April 2008, he was transferred to serve his sentence in Italy. Credit was given for time served since 18 October 1999. Early release was granted on 29 November 2012 and Naletilić was released from prison on 18 February 2013.

He died on 17 December 2021, at the age of 75.
