= Rajski =

Rajski is a surname of Polish origin. Notable people with the surname include:

- Leszek Rajski (born 1983), Polish fencer
- Wojciech Rajski (born 1948), Polish conductor
- Peggy Rajski, American film director

== See also ==
- Rajski Do (Serbian Cyrillic: Рајски До), a village in the municipality of Trnovo, Republika Srpska
