= Doljani, Jablanica =

Doljani
- Village
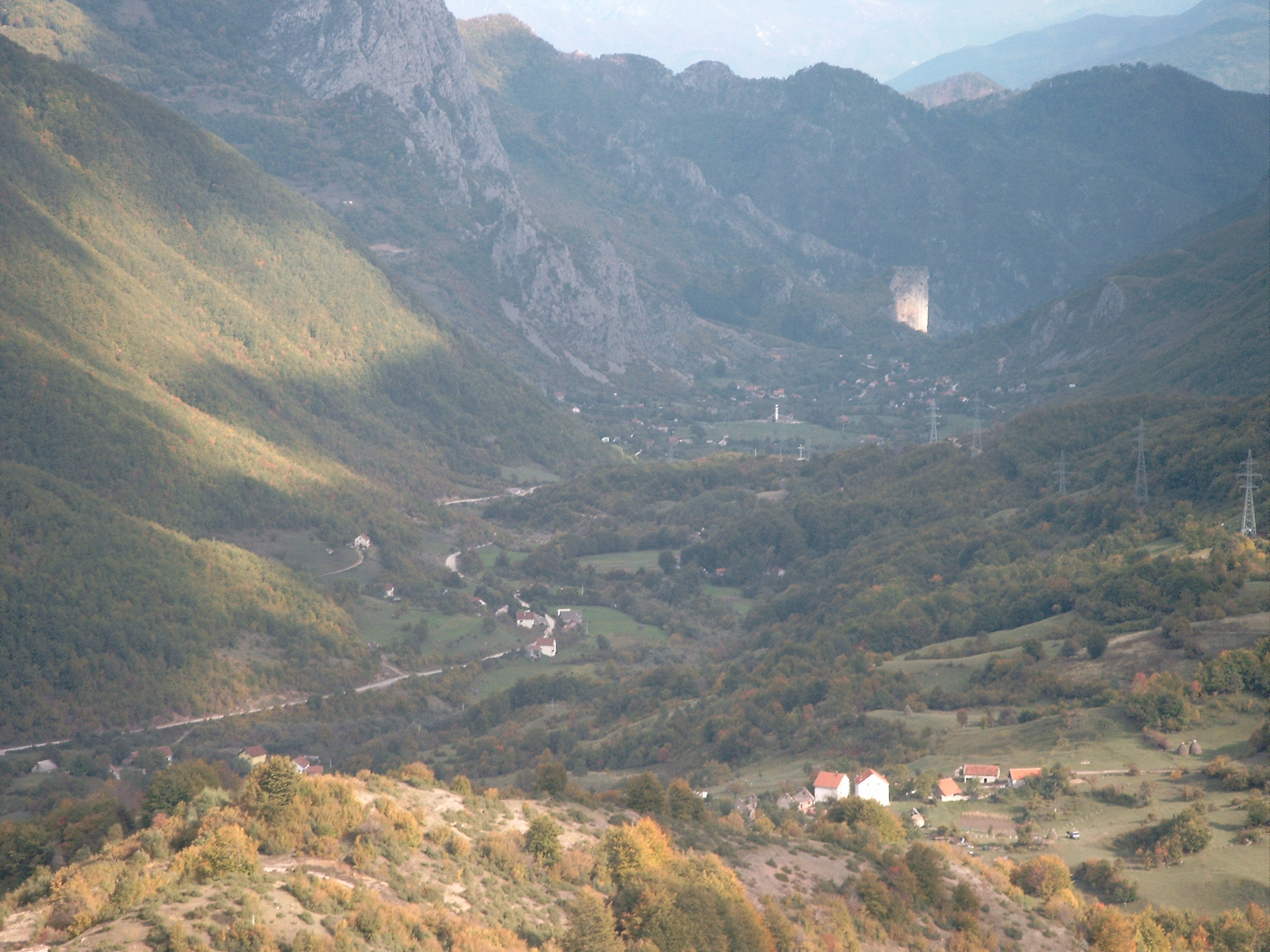
- The view from the Obruč (Rim)

- Location within Bosnia and Herzegovina
- Coordinates: 43°41′38″N 17°39′37″E
- Country: Bosnia and Herzegovina
- Entity: Federation of Bosnia and Herzegovina
- Canton: Herzegovina-Neretva
- Municipality: Jablanica

Area
  - Total: 18.56 sq mi (48.07 km^{2})

Population (2013)
  - Total: 483
  - Density: 26.0/sq mi (10.0/km^{2})
- Time zone: UTC+1 (CET)
  - Summer (DST): UTC+2 (CEST)
- Postal code: 88420

Doljani is populated place in Jablanica Municipality, Bosnia and Hercegovina, between Jablanica and Mostar. This village lies along the Doljanka river (which was named after it) Doljani are located in the northern Herzegovina, in the northeastern part of the Nature Park "Blidinje". Elevation ranges from 600 to 750 meters in the place. The highest peaks that surround the village are Baćin (1,282 m), Borovinka (1430 m), and Vitlenica (1655 m) Throughout the Doljani valley flowing the river Doljanka.

== History ==
The area of Doljani has been inhabited since earlier periods, with the local population traditionally engaged in agriculture, livestock breeding, and forestry. During the time of the Socialist Federal Republic of Yugoslavia, Doljani functioned as a rural settlement within the municipality of Jablanica, with gradual development of local infrastructure.

During the Bosnian War (1992–1995), Doljani and its surrounding areas were affected by armed conflict between the Army of the Republic of Bosnia and Herzegovina (ARBiH) and the Croatian Defence Council (HVO). The conflict resulted in destruction of property, displacement of civilians, and significant demographic changes. In 1993, the area was the site of the Sovići and Doljani killings, in which civilians and prisoners of war were killed.

== Demography ==
Doljani Total population in 2013: 568
Census Year	1991	1981	1971
Croats	708 (67,49%)	731 (69,68%)	754 (71,80%)
Bosniaks	326 (31,07%)	316 (30,12%)	294 (28,00%)
Serbs	0	1 (0,09%)	1 (0,09%)
Yugoslavians	10 (0,95%)	0	0
Others and unknown	5 (0,47%)	1 (0,09%)	1 (0,09%)
Total	1,049	1,049	1.050

According to the 2013 census, its population was 483.

Ethnicity in 2013
Ethnicity	Number	Percentage
Croats	293	60.7%
Bosniaks	186	38.5%
other/undeclared	4	0.8%
Total	483	100%

== See also ==
- Jablanica
- Doljanka
