= Stari Most =

Bridge in Mostar, Bosnia and Herzegovina

Old Bridge
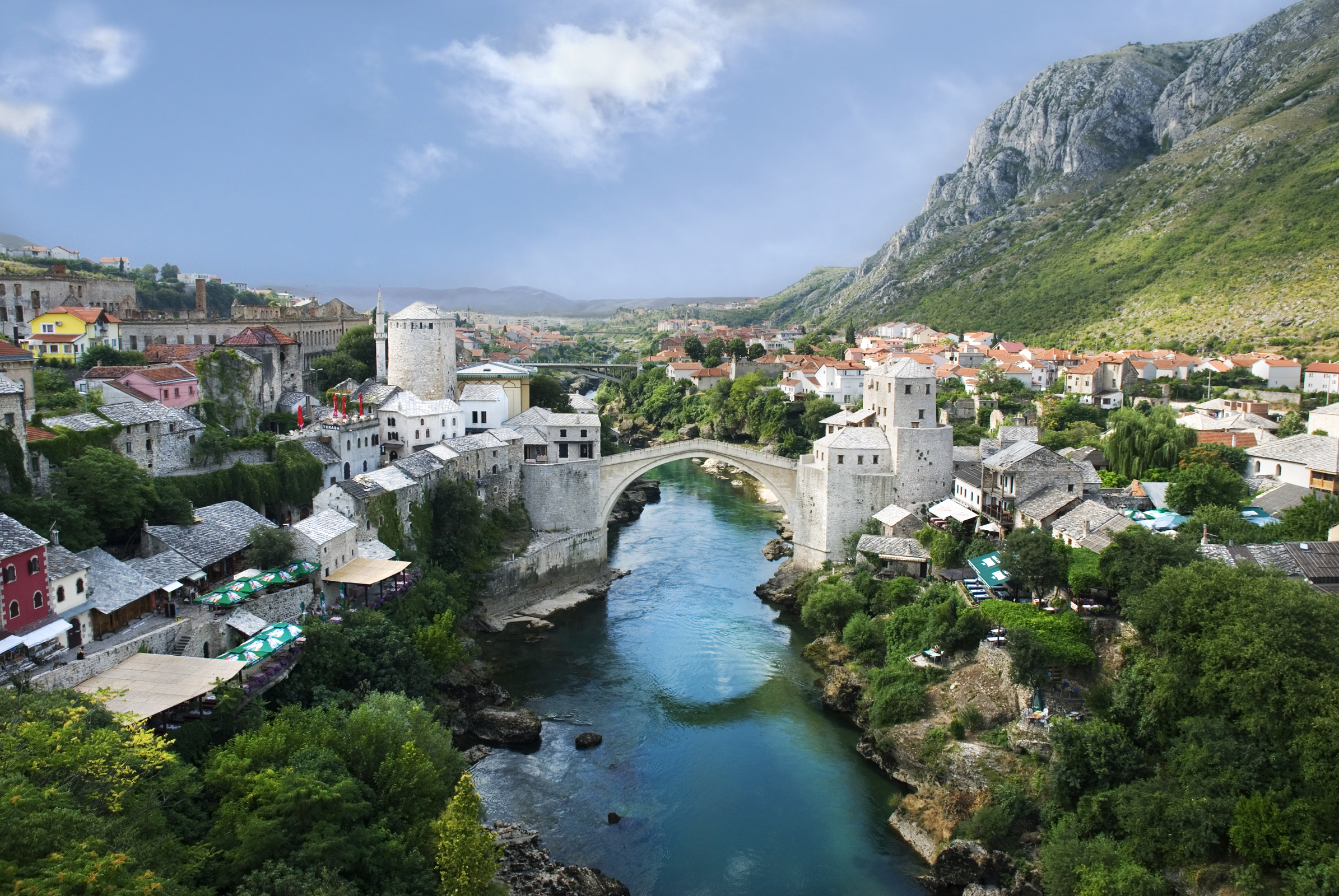
- The Old Bridge in 2007
- Coordinates: 43°20′14″N 17°48′54″E
- Carried: Pedestrians
- Crossed: Neretva
- Locale: Mostar, Bosnia and Herzegovina
- Official name: Stari most
- Heritage status

UNESCO World Heritage Site
- Official name: Old Bridge Area of the Old City of Mostar
- Type: Cultural
- Criteria: vi
- Designated: 2005 (29th session)
- Reference no.: 946
- Region: Europe

KONS of Bosnia and Herzegovina
- Official name: Old Bridge (Stari Most) in Mostar
- Type: Category 0 cultural property
- Criteria: A, B, C ii.iii.iv., D ii.iv., E i.ii.iii.iv.v., F i.ii.iii., G i.v.vi.vii., H ii., I i.ii.iii.
- Designated: 8 July 2004 (session No. 07.1-02-903/03-29)
- Part of: Mostar, the historic urban site
- Reference no.: 2493
- List of National Monuments of Bosnia and Herzegovina

Characteristics
- Design: Arch
- Material: Stone
- Total length: 29 metres (95 ft)
- Width: 4 metres (13 ft)
- No. of spans: 1
- Clearance below: c. 20 metres (66 ft) at mid-span depending on river water-level

History
- Architect: Mimar Hayruddin (concept could originate from Mimar Sinan's idea)
- Constructed by: Mimar Hayruddin, apprentice of Mimar Sinan
- Construction start: 1557
- Construction end: 1566
- Opened: 1566; 460 years ago
- Rebuilt: 7 June 2001 – 23 July 2004
- Destroyed: 9 November 1993

Location
- Interactive map of Old Bridge

The Old Bridge (Serbo-Croatian: Stari most), also known as the Mostar Bridge, is a rebuilt 16th-century Ottoman bridge in the city of Mostar in Bosnia and Herzegovina. It crosses the river Neretva and connects the two parts of the city, which is named after the bridge keepers (mostari) who guarded the Old Bridge during the Ottoman era. Commissioned by Suleiman the Magnificent in 1557 and designed by Mimar Hayruddin, a student and apprentice of the architect Mimar Sinan, the Old Bridge is an exemplary piece of Balkan Islamic architecture.

During the Croat–Bosniak War, the Army of the Republic of Bosnia and Herzegovina (ARBiH) used the bridge as a military supply line, leading the Croatian Defence Council (HVO) to shell and destroy it on 9 November 1993. Subsequently, the bridge was reconstructed, and it reopened on 23 July 2004. In 2017, the International Criminal Tribunal for the former Yugoslavia (ICTY) deemed that the bridge was a legitimate military target.

== Characteristics ==
The bridge spans the Neretva River in the old town of Mostar, the unofficial capital of Herzegovina. The Stari Most is hump-backed, 4 metres (13 ft 1 in) wide and 30 metres (98 ft 5 in) long, and dominates the river from a height of 24 m (78 ft 9 in). Two fortified towers protect it: the Halebija tower on the northeast and the Tara tower on the southwest, called "the bridge keepers" (natively mostari).

Instead of foundations, the bridge has abutments of limestone linked to wing walls along the waterside cliffs. Measuring from the summer water level of 40.05 m (131 ft 5 in), abutments are erected to a height of 6.53 metres (21 ft 5 in), from which the arch springs to its high point. The start of the arch is emphasised by a moulding 0.32 metres (1 ft 1 in) in height. The rise of the arch is 12.02 metres (39 ft 5 in).

== History ==
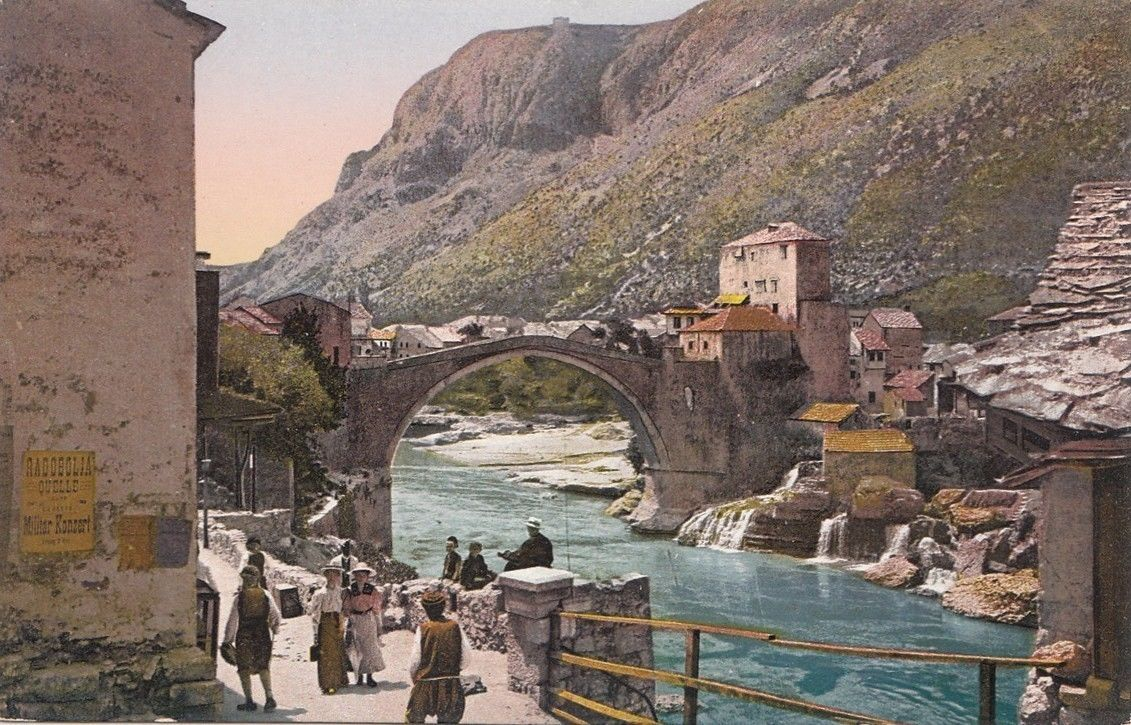
Stari Most in 1911

The stone single-arch bridge is considered an exemplary piece of Balkan Islamic architecture and was commissioned by Suleiman the Magnificent in 1557. It was designed by Mimar Hayruddin, a student and apprentice of architect Mimar Sinan who built many of the Sultan's key buildings in Istanbul and around the empire.

As Mostar's economic and administrative importance grew with the growing presence of Ottoman rule, the precarious wooden suspension bridge over the Neretva gorge required replacement. The old bridge on the river "...was made of wood and hung on chains," wrote the Ottoman geographer Katip Çelebi, and it "...swayed so much that people crossing it did so in mortal fear". In 1566, Mimar Hayruddin designed the replacement bridge, which was said to have cost 300,000 Drams (silver coins) to build. The two-year construction project was supervised by Karagoz Mehmet Bey, Sultan Suleiman's son-in-law and the patron of Mostar's most important mosque complex, the Hadzi Mehmed Karadzozbeg Mosque.

Construction began in 1557 and took nine years: according to the inscription, the bridge was completed in 974 AH, corresponding to the period between 19 July 1566 and 7 July 1567. Little is known of the construction of the bridge, thought to have been made from mortar made with egg whites, and all that has been preserved in writing are memories and legends and the name of the builder, Mimar Hayruddin. Charged under pain of death to construct a bridge of such unprecedented dimensions, Hayruddin reportedly prepared for his funeral on the day the scaffolding was finally removed from the completed structure. Upon its completion, it was the widest human-made arch in the world.

The 17th century Ottoman explorer Evliya Çelebi wrote that the bridge "is like a rainbow arch soaring up to the skies, extending from one cliff to the other... I, a poor and miserable slave of Allah, have passed through 16 countries, but I have never seen such a high bridge. It is thrown from rock to rock as high as the sky."

=== Destruction ===
During the Croat–Bosniak War, the Bosniak Army of the Republic of Bosnia and Herzegovina used the Old Bridge as a military supply line. Slobodan Praljak, the commander of the Croat Defence Council, ordered the destruction of the bridge, which collapsed on 9 November 1993 as a result of shelling by the Bosnian Croat forces. The International Criminal Tribunal for the former Yugoslavia found it to be a legitimate military target as the opposing Army of the Republic of Bosnia and Herzegovina used it for military purposes.

The first temporary bridge on the traces of the Old Bridge was opened on 30 December 1993; it was built in only three days by Spanish military engineers assigned to the United Nations Protection Force (UNPROFOR) mission. The temporary structure was subsequently upgraded three times, to eventually link the shores with a more secure cable-stayed bridge until the proper reconstruction of the Old Bridge.

Newspapers based in Sarajevo reported that more than 60 shells hit the bridge before it collapsed. Praljak published a document, "How the Old Bridge Was Destroyed", where he argues that there was an explosive charge or mine placed at the centre of the bridge underneath and detonated remotely, in addition to the shelling, which caused the collapse. Most historians dismiss these claims and disagree with their conclusions.

Some scholars assessed that the bridge had little military significance and that the shelling of the old town centre represented a deliberate destruction of cultural heritage, particularly the Old Bridge, which symbolized the connection of different communities. András Riedlmayer described the demolition as an act of “killing memory,” or memoricide, in which shared cultural heritage was intentionally destroyed.

Croatian media reported claims that the bridge was destroyed by units of the Army of the Republic of Bosnia and Herzegovina (ARBiH), primarily referencing materials published by Slobodan Praljak on his personal website, where he presented analyses based on available video recordings of the demolition. They also published conspiracy theories about Bosniak units destroying the bridge in order to blame the Croats for the destruction.

On 6 April 2023, a video was released showing footage recorded from Mount Hum, continuously following the trajectories of more than 50 projectiles fired by a tank of the Croatian Defence Council (HVO), while voices identified as HVO soldiers can be heard cheering and shouting profanities as the projectiles struck the bridge.

=== Reconstruction ===
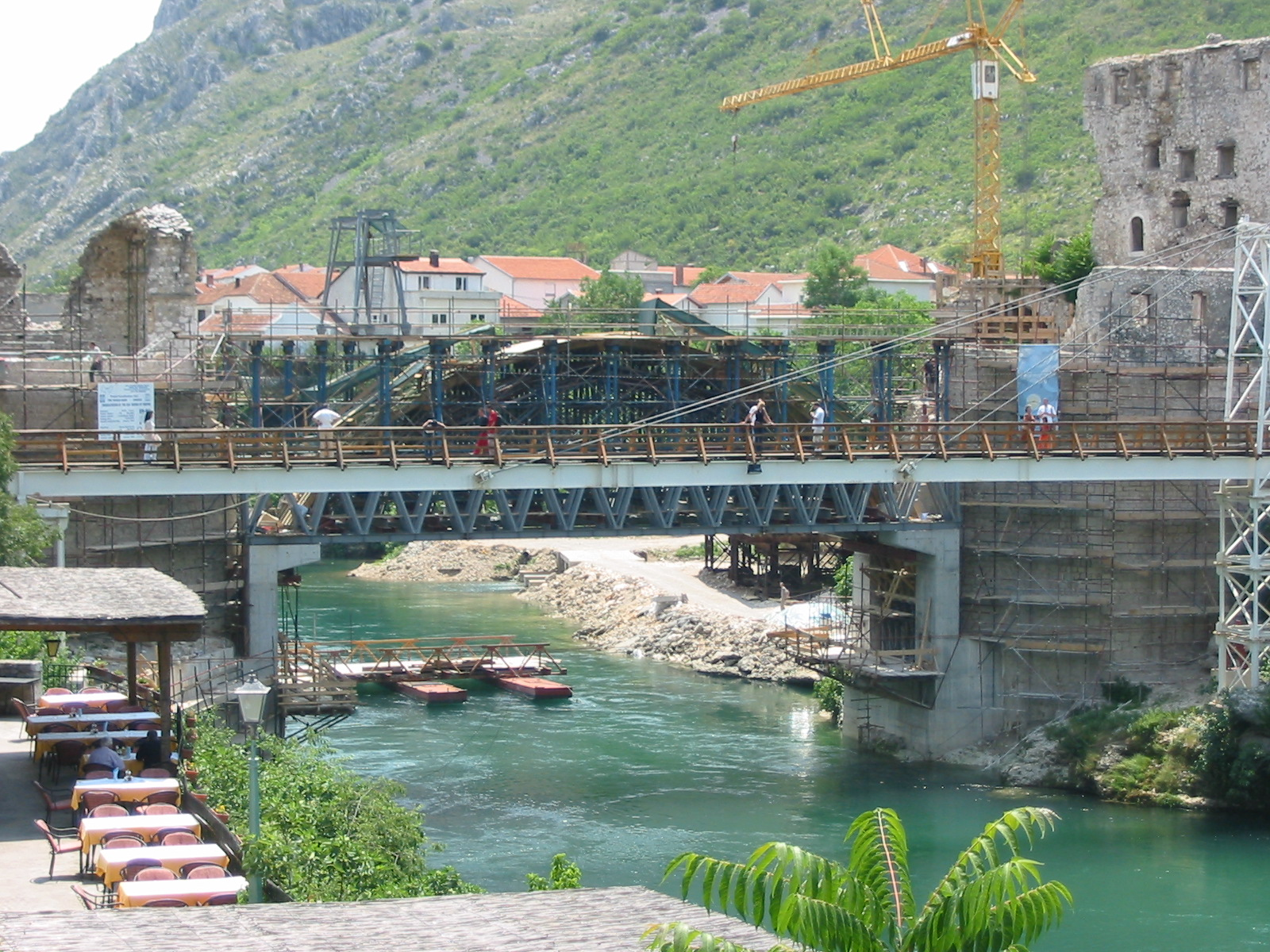
Stari Most undergoing reconstruction in 2003

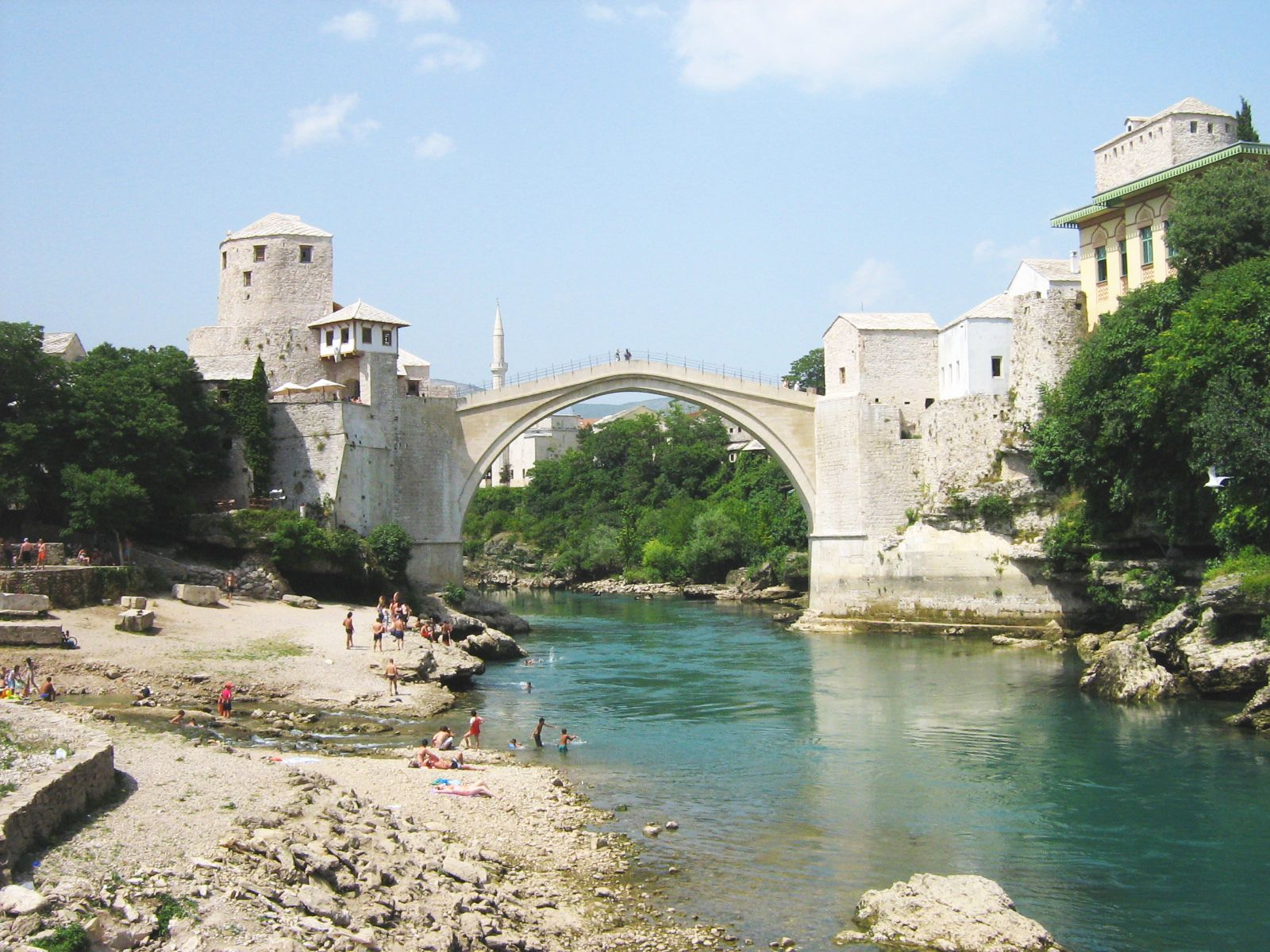
Reconstructed Stari Most in 2006

After the end of the war, plans were made to reconstruct the bridge. The World Bank, the United Nations Educational, Scientific and Cultural Organization (UNESCO), the Aga Khan Trust for Culture and the World Monuments Fund formed a coalition to oversee the reconstruction of the Stari Most and the historic city centre of Mostar. Additional funding was provided by Italy, the Netherlands, Turkey, Croatia and the Council of Europe Development Bank, as well as the Government of BiH. In October 1998, UNESCO established an international committee of experts to oversee the design and reconstruction work. It was decided to build a bridge as similar as possible to the original, using the same technology and materials.

The bridge was re-built in two phases: the first one being led by Hungarian army engineers, consisting of the lifting of submerged material for its repurpose; and the second one being the removal of the temporary bridge, a task assigned to Spanish army engineers, and the reconstruction of the Old Bridge with Ottoman construction techniques by a partnership of civil engineering companies led by the Turkish Er-Bu. Tenelia, a fine-grained limestone, sourced from local quarries was used and Hungarian army divers recovered stones from the original bridge from the river below, although most were too damaged to reuse.

Reconstruction commenced on 7 June 2001. The reconstructed bridge was inaugurated on 23 July 2004, with the cost estimated to be 15.5 million US dollars.

== Diving ==
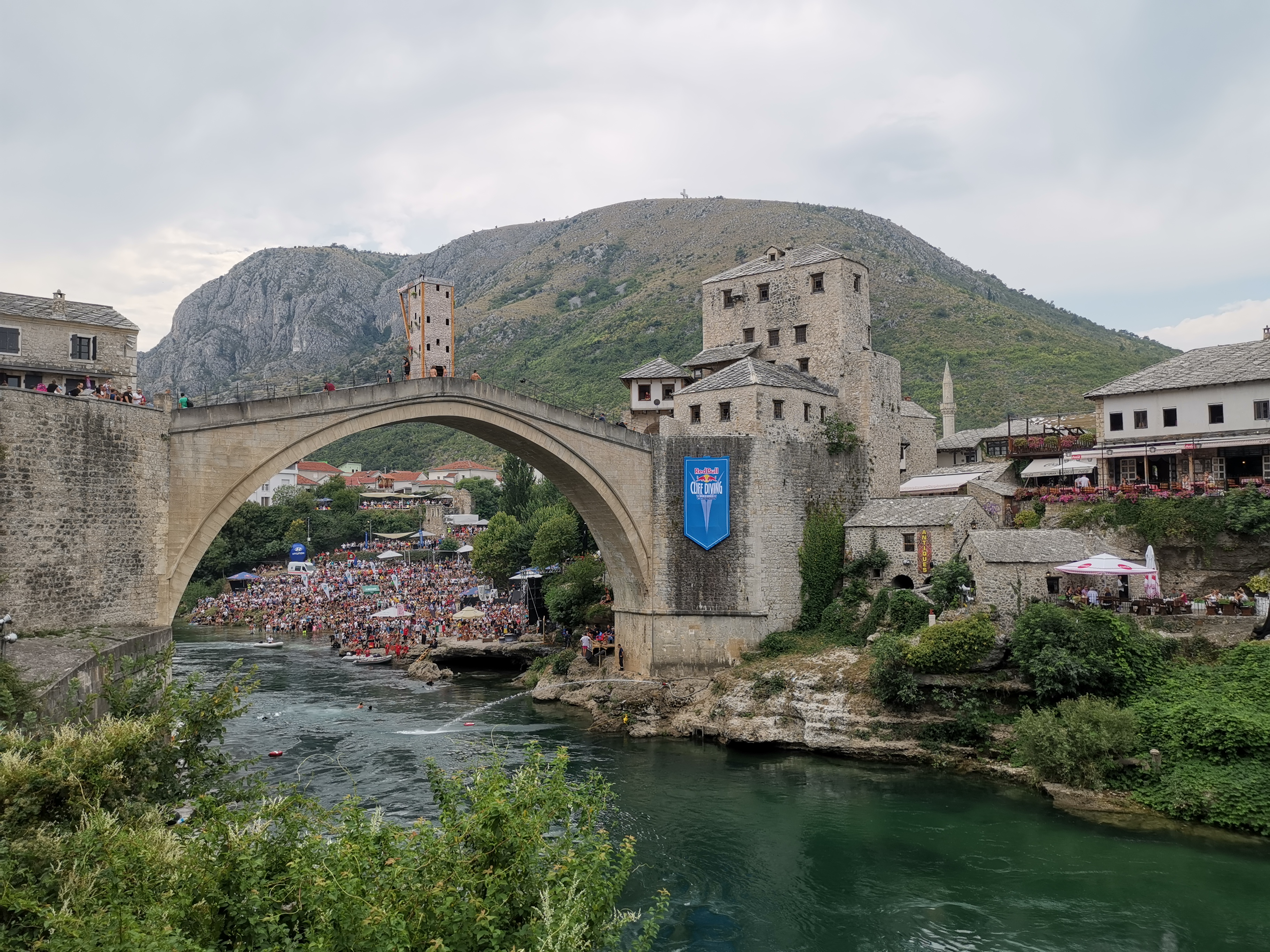
Stari Most during the 2019 Red Bull Cliff Diving World Series

Stari Most diving is a traditional annual competition in diving, which is organised every year in midsummer (end of July). It is traditional for the town's young men to leap from the bridge into the Neretva. As the Neretva is very cold, this is a risky feat and requires skill and training, though according to TripAdvisor, tourists do dive as well. In 1968 a formal diving competition was inaugurated and held every summer. The first person to jump from the bridge since it was reopened was Enej Kelecija.

Since 2015, Stari Most has been a tour stop in the Red Bull Cliff Diving World Series. In 2019 the diving was featured on Series 2, episode 3 of The Misadventures of Romesh Ranganathan.

== In popular culture ==
- Turkish rock band Bulutsuzluk Özlemi's 1996 song "Yaşamaya Mecbursun" (lit. 'You have to live') is about the destruction of Stari Most.
- Old Bridge, a play by Papatango New Writing Prize winner Igor Memic, explores personal and historical narratives tied to the significance of the Old Bridge in Mostar. It premiered in 2021 at the Bush Theatre in London and received the Outstanding Achievement in an Affiliate Theatre award at the 2022 Olivier Awards.

== See also ==
- List of bridges in Bosnia and Herzegovina
- List of World Heritage Sites in Bosnia and Herzegovina
- List of National Monuments of Bosnia and Herzegovina
- Tourism in Bosnia and Herzegovina
- Museum of the Old Bridge
- History of Bosnia and Herzegovina
