= Kijevo, Trnovo =

Kijevo Кијево
- Village
- Location within Bosnia and Herzegovina
- Coordinates: 43°45′33″N 18°24′41″E
- Country: Bosnia and Herzegovina
- Municipality: Trnovo
- Time zone: UTC+1 (CET)
  - Summer (DST): UTC+2 (CEST)

Kijevo (Serbian Cyrillic: Кијево) is a village in Trnovo municipality, Istočno Sarajevo, Republika Srpska, Bosnia and Herzegovina. Kijevo is south of Sarajevo on the road M-18 Sarajevo-Trnovo-Foča-Trebinje. The closest airport is Sarajevo International Airport, located 9.7 km north west of Kijevo. The Željeznica river is one of the Kijevo's chief geographic features. It flows through the town and municipality from south through the center of Trnovo, Kijevo and Istočno (East) Sarajevo to west part of Sarajevo eventually meets up with the Bosna river.
