= Donja Presjenica =

- Village
- Location within Bosnia and Herzegovina
- Coordinates: 43°43′29″N 18°22′36″E
- Country: Bosnia and Herzegovina
- Entity: Federation of Bosnia and Herzegovina
- Municipality: Trnovo
- Time zone: UTC+1 (CET)
  - Summer (DST): UTC+2 (CEST)

Donja Presjenica is a village in the municipality of Trnovo, Bosnia and Herzegovina.
