= Trnovo, Republika Srpska =

Trnovo Трново
- Municipality
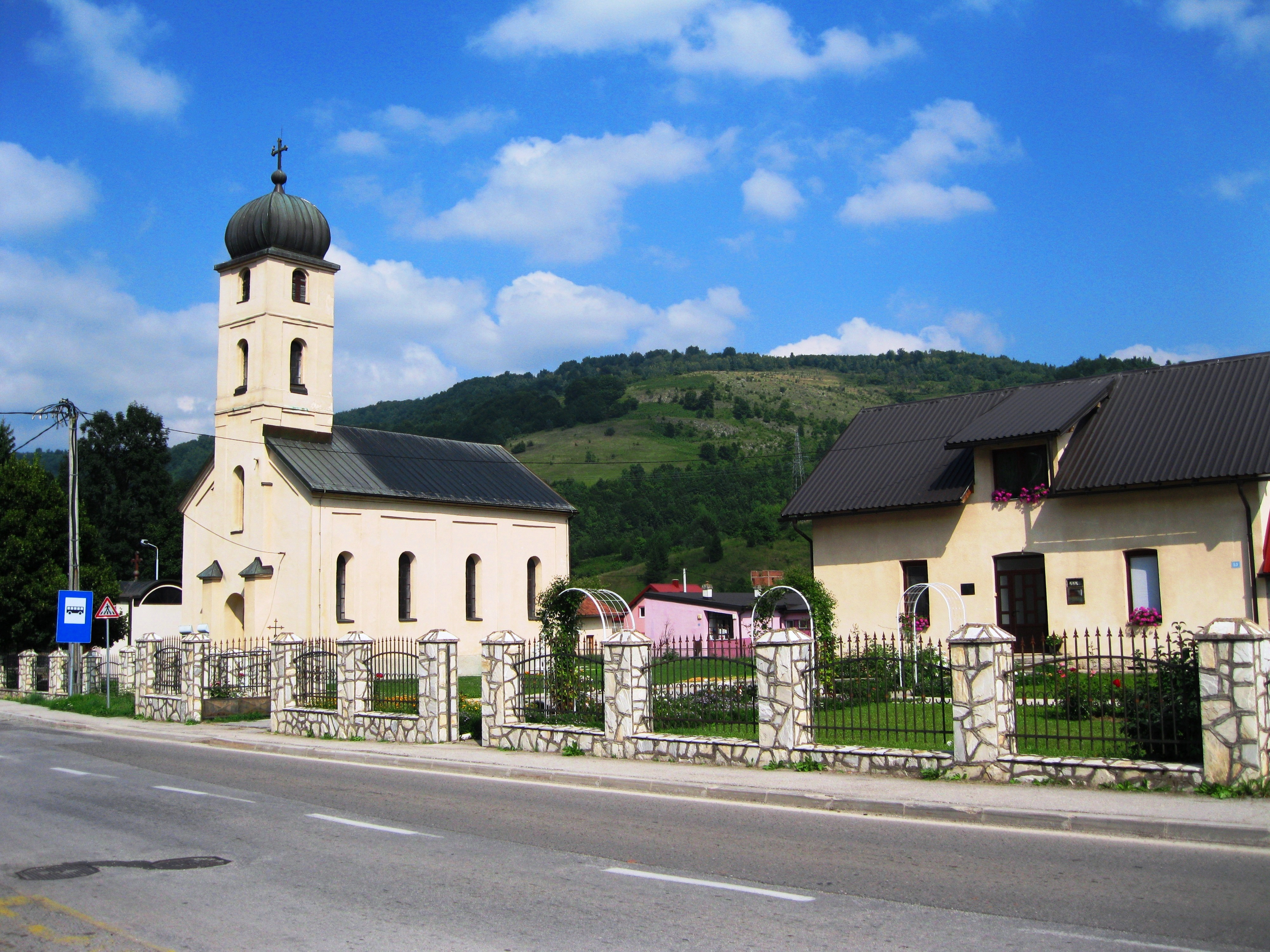

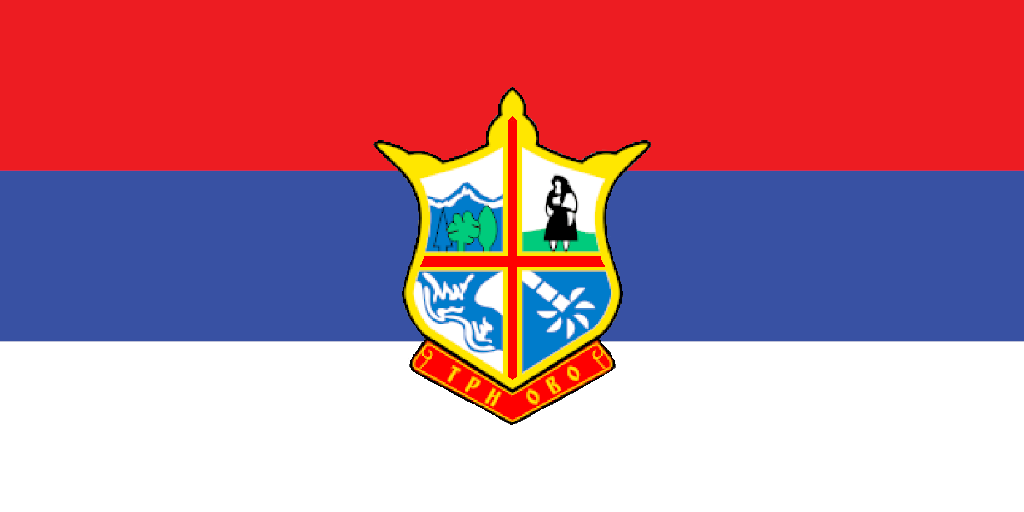
- Flag

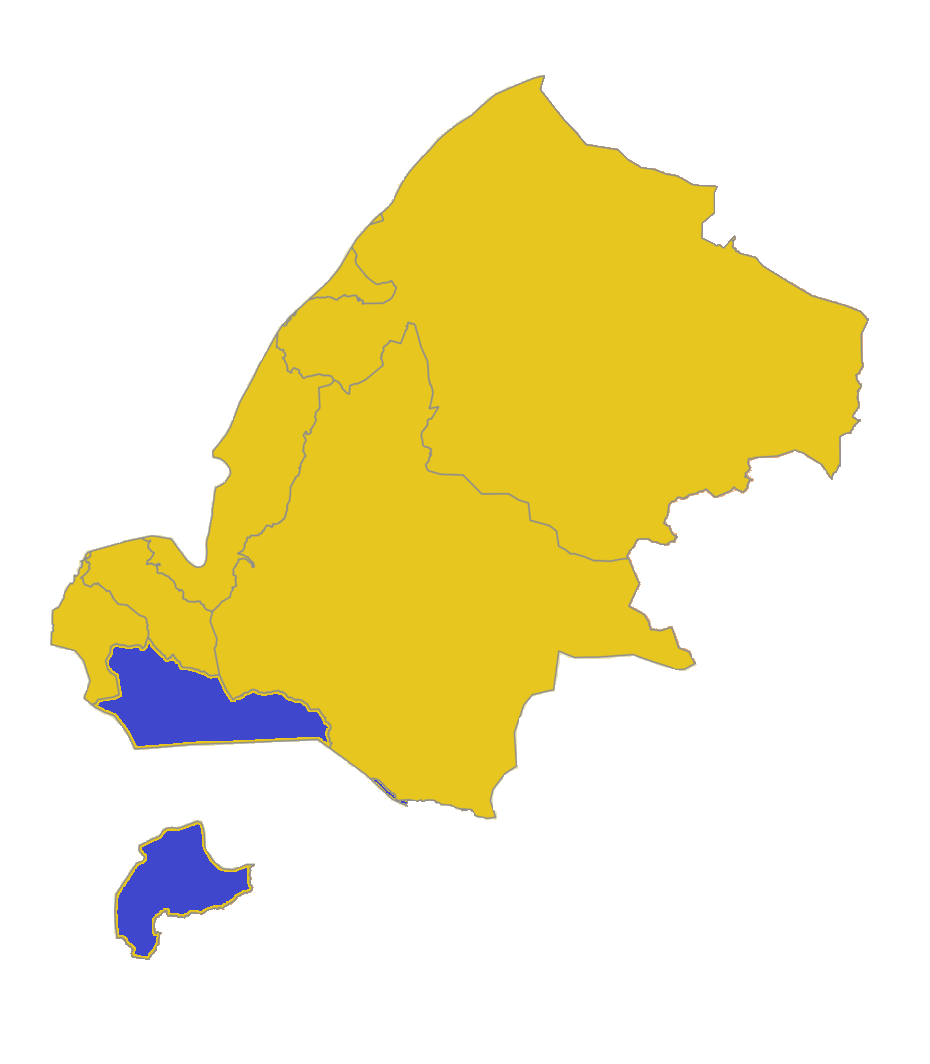
- Location of Trnovo within the city of Istočno Sarajevo
- Coordinates: 43°39′56″N 18°26′47″E
- Country: Bosnia and Herzegovina
- Entity: Republika Srpska
- City: Istočno Sarajevo
- Status: Suburban

Government
  - Municipal mayor: Dragomir Gagović (SNSD)

Area
  - Total: 138 km^{2} (53 sq mi)

Population (2013 census)
  - Total: 2,050
- Time zone: UTC+1 (CET)
  - Summer (DST): UTC+2 (CEST)
- Postal code: 71350
- Area code: +387 57
- Website: www.trnovo-rs.com

Trnovo (Serbian Cyrillic: Трново) is a municipality of the city of Istočno Sarajevo, Republika Srpska, Bosnia and Herzegovina.

As of 2013, the municipality had a population of 2,050 inhabitants. The town itself had a total population of 1,023, with 956 of them living in the Republika Srpska part and 67 in the Federation part.

It consists of roughly one third of the pre-war municipality of Trnovo. Roughly two thirds of the pre-war Trnovo municipality is now part of the Federation of Bosnia and Herzegovina entity.

== Geography ==
Trnovo is situated south of Sarajevo on the M-18 road Sarajevo-Trnovo-Foča-Trebinje. It is surrounded by the Jahorina, Bjelašnica and Treskavica mountains which were the locations of Olympic competitions during the 1984 Winter Olympics. Those mountains are popular destinations for a variety of winter sports and activities.

The Željeznica river is one of the town's chief geographic features. It flows through the town and municipality from south through the center of Trnovo, Kijevo and East Sarajevo to west part of Sarajevo City eventually meets with the Bosna river.

== Settlements ==
Aside from the town of Trnovo, the municipality includes the following settlements:

- Bašci
- Bistročaj
- Bogatići
- Boljanovići
- Divčići
- Donja Presjenica
- Govedovići
- Grab
- Gračanica
- Ilovice
- Jablanica
- Kijevo
- Klanac
- Kozija Luka
- Milje
- Podivič
- Rajski Do
- Slavljevići
- Tošići
- Turovi
- Ulobići
- Vrbovnik
- Zabojska

== Demographics ==
The pre-war municipality, with 63 settlements, had a total population of 6,991 people, of whom Muslims consisted 68.81% and Serbs 29.45% of total population. Most of the Serb-inhabited settlements became part of the Trnovo municipality of Republika Srpska (RS). The 2013 census preliminary results counted 2,192 inhabitants of the municipality of Trnovo in RS, and 1,018 in the settlement of Trnovo in RS.

=== Population ===
Population of settlements – Trnovo (RS) municipality
	Settlement	1971.	1981.	1991.	2013.
	Total	9,555	8,161	6,991	2,050
1	Jablanica			435	257
2	Kijevo			452	269
3	Tošići			391	259
4	Trnovo	765	1,403	2,099	1,018

=== Ethnic composition ===
Ethnic composition – Trnovo (RS) town
	2013.	1991.	1981.	1971.
Total	956 (100,0%)	2,099 (100,0%)	1,403 (100,0%)	765 (100,0%)
Bosniaks	234 (24,5%)	1,078 (51,36%)	552 (39,34%)	233 (30,46%)
Serbs	705 (73,7%)	939 (44,74%)	737 (52,53%)	506 (66,14%)
Yugoslavs		46 (2,192%)	91 (6,486%)	1 (0,131%)
Others	10 (1,0%)	22 (1,048%)	2 (0,143%)	
Croats	7 (0,7%)	14 (0,667%)	8 (0,570%)	17 (2,222%)
Montenegrins			13 (0,927%)	7 (0,915%)
Slovenes				1 (0,131%)

Ethnic composition – Trnovo (RS) municipality
	2013.	1991.	1981.	1971.
Total	2,050 (100,0%)	6,991 (100,0%)	8,161 (100,0%)	9,555 (100,0%)
Serbs	1,178 (57,46%)	2,059 (29,45%)	2,242 (27,47%)	3,093 (32,37%)
Bosniaks	837 (40,83%)	4,790 (68,52%)	5,693 (69,76%)	6,342 (66,37%)
Others	20 (0,976%)	54 (0,772%)	22 (0,270%)	40 (0,419%)
Croats	15 (0,732%)	16 (0,229%)	19 (0,233%)	50 (0,523%)
Yugoslavs		72 (1,030%)	163 (1,997%)	12 (0,126%)
Montenegrins			19 (0,233%)	17 (0,178%)
Slovenes			3 (0,037%)	1 (0,010%)

== Gallery ==
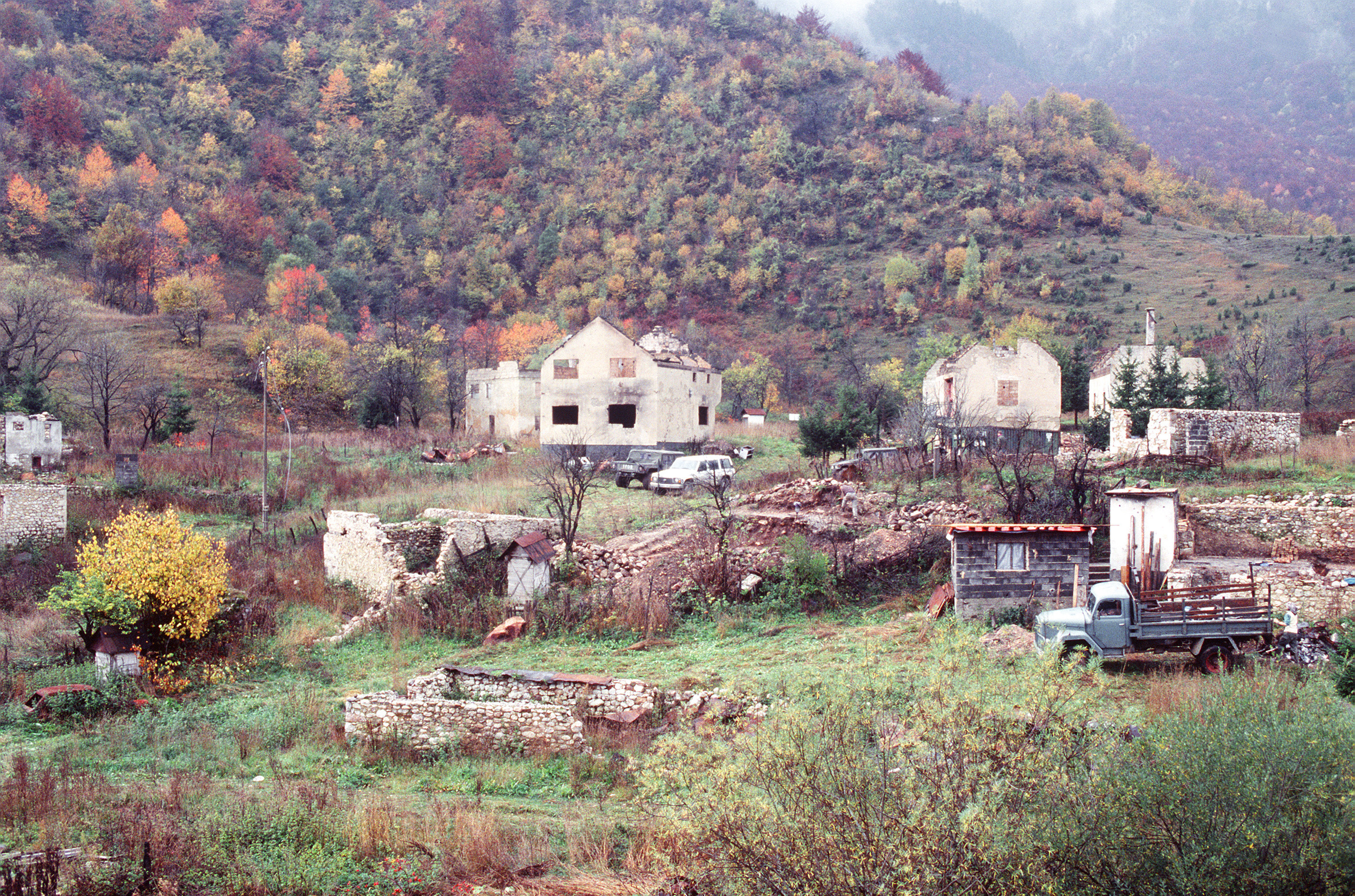
Ruined Trnovo after the Bosnian war, 9 October 1996

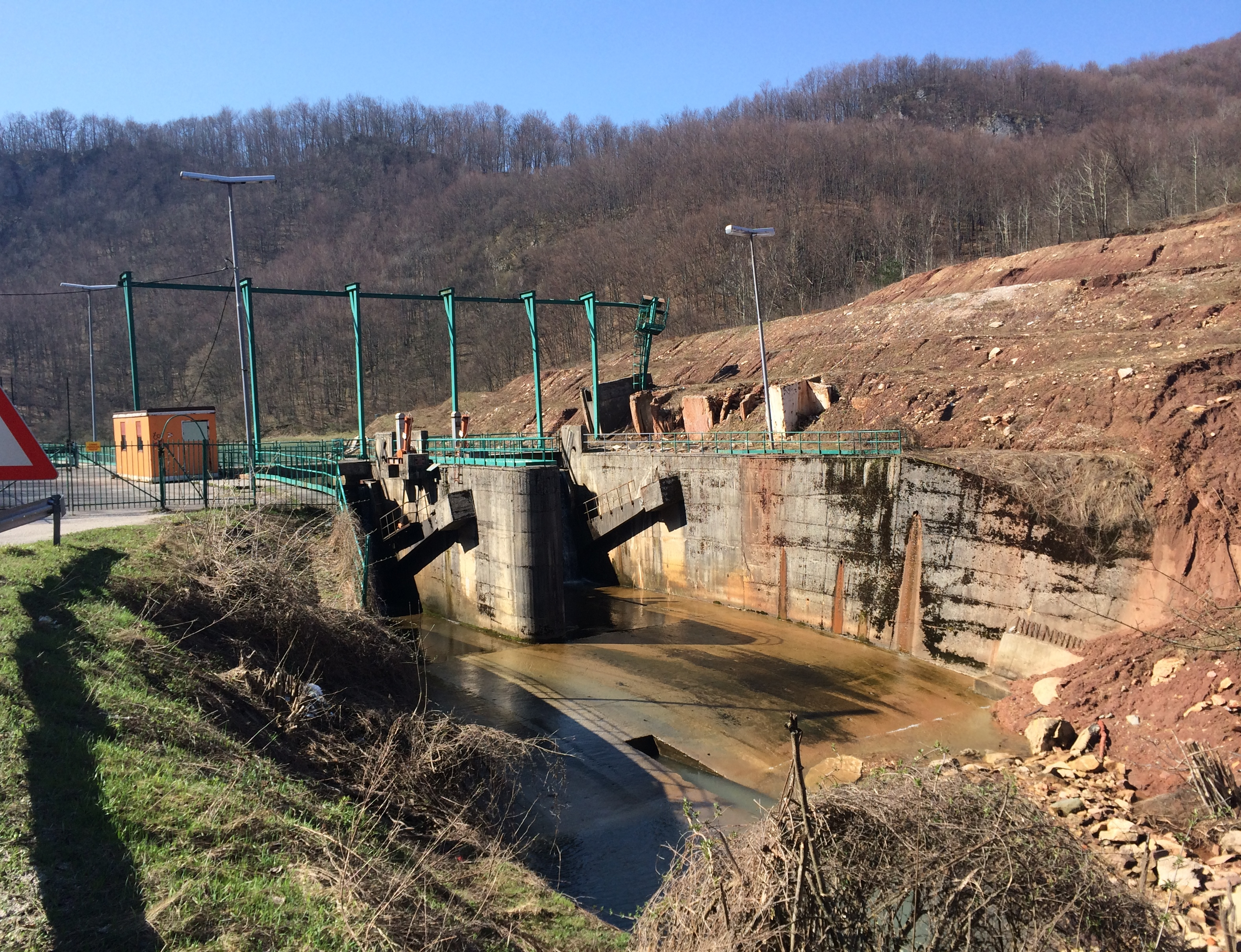
Bogatići Small Hydroelectric Power Station

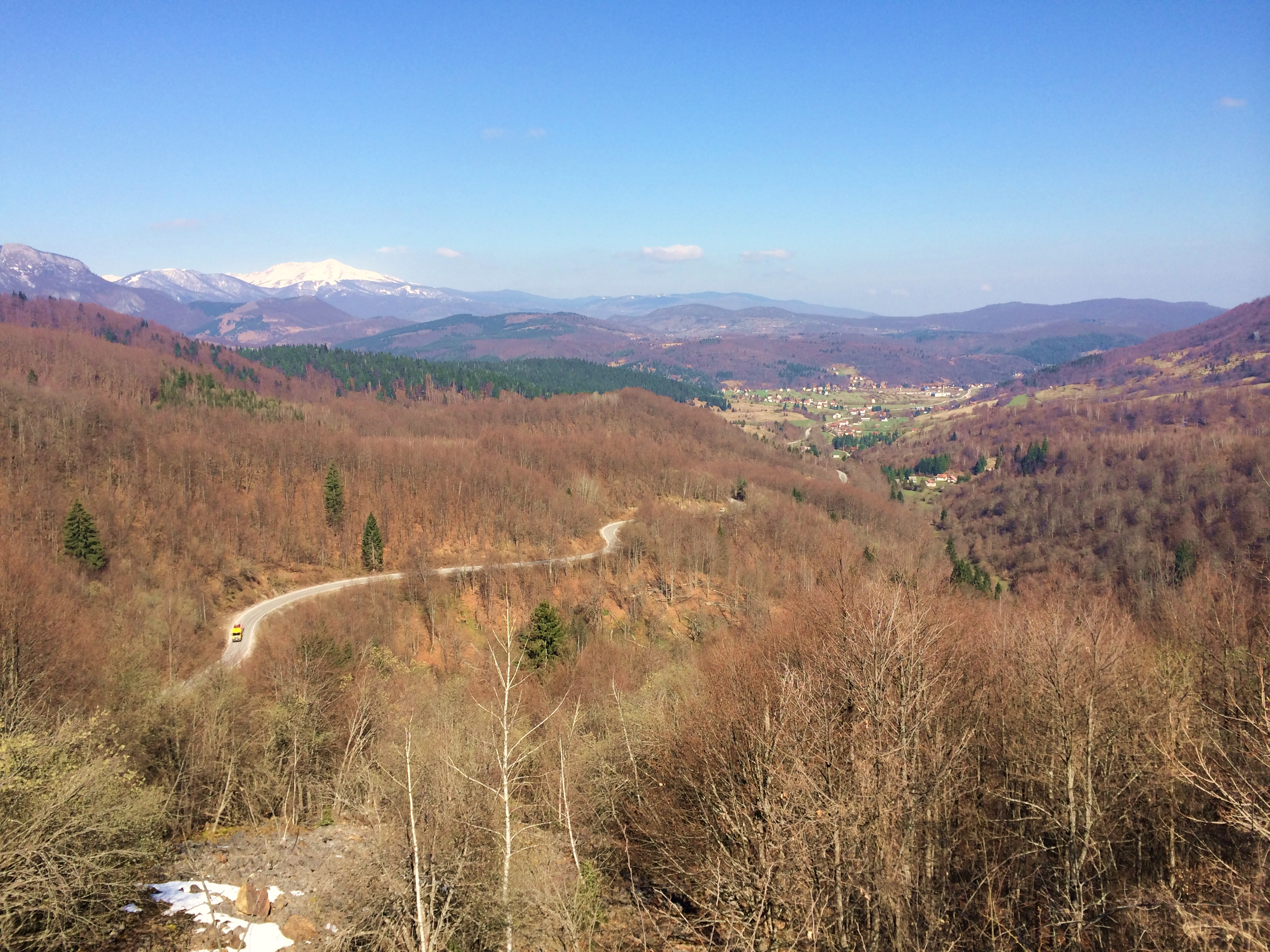
Landscape from the area

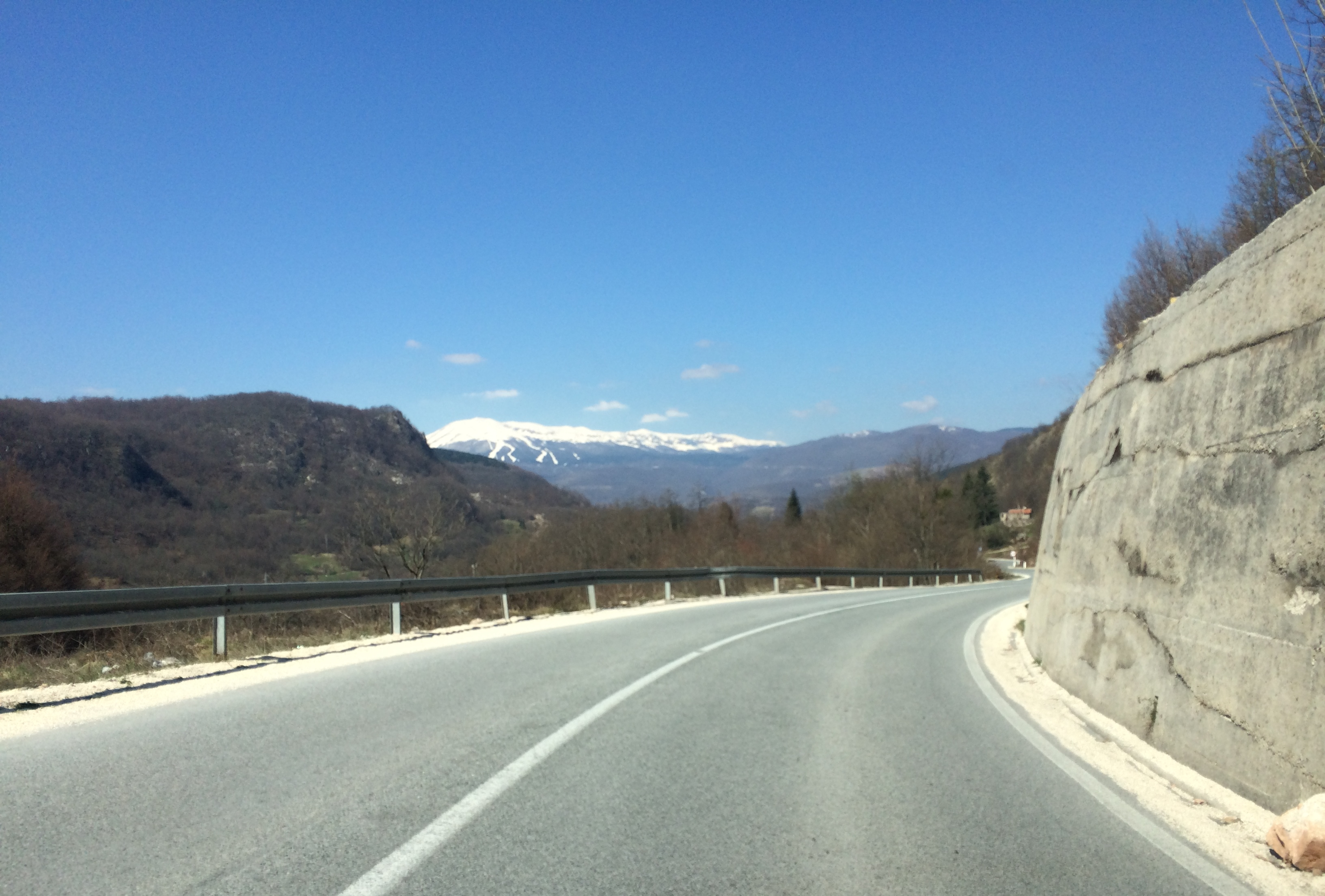
Road towardsTrnovo

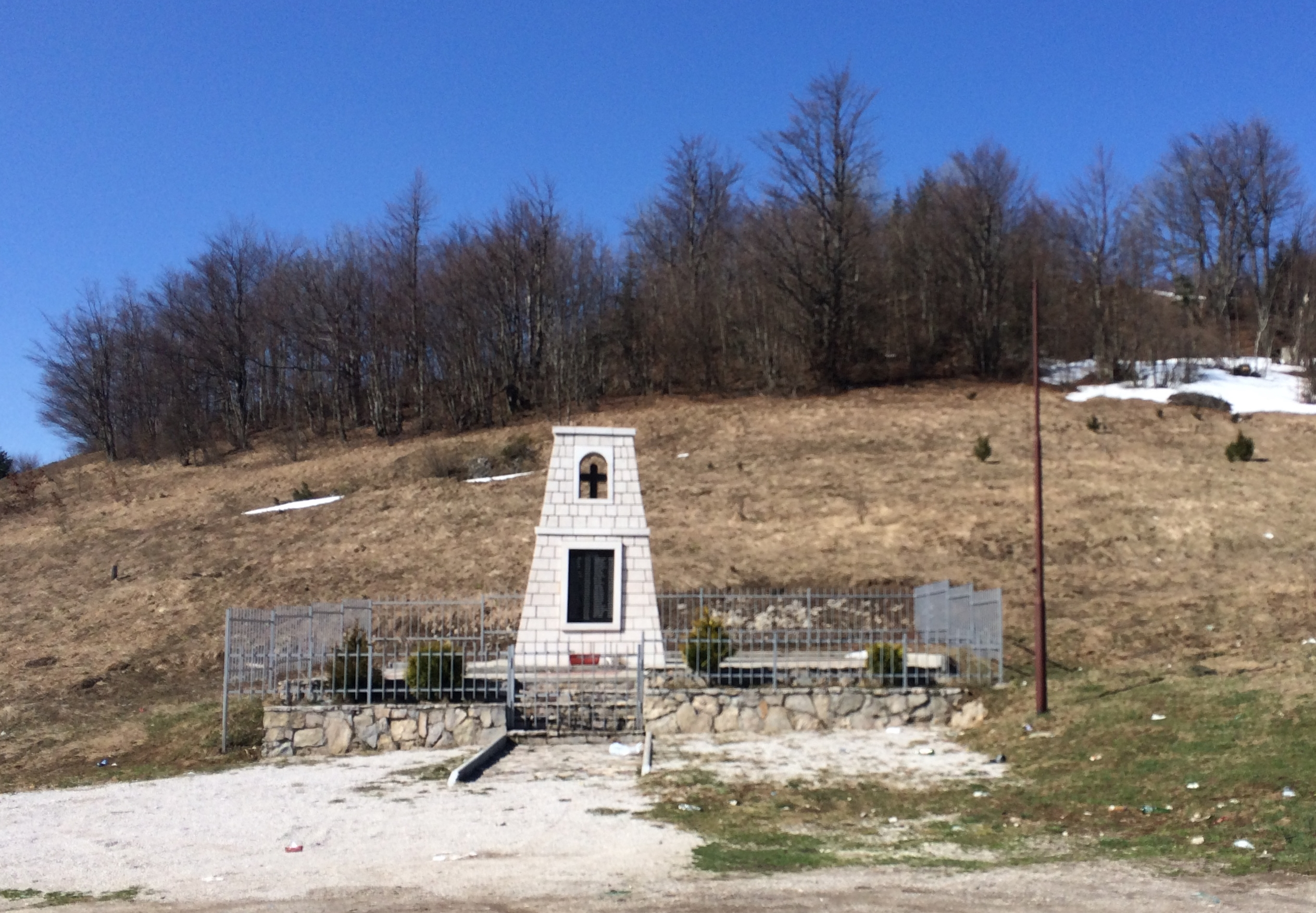
Monument dedicated to the Serb victims of the Bosnian war
