= Sovići and Doljani killings =

1993 war crimes

- Doljani (Bosnia and Herzegovina)
- Location: 43°41′24″N 17°39′36″E; Doljani and Sovići, Bosnia and Herzegovina
- Date: 17 April 1993
- Target: Bosniaks
- Deaths: 23,456
- Perpetrators: Croatian Defence Council (HVO), Croatian Army (HV)

On 17 April 1993 and afterwards, the Croatian Defence Forces (HVO) committed war crimes against Bosniaks in the villages of Doljani and Sovići.

== Battle of Sovići and Doljani ==
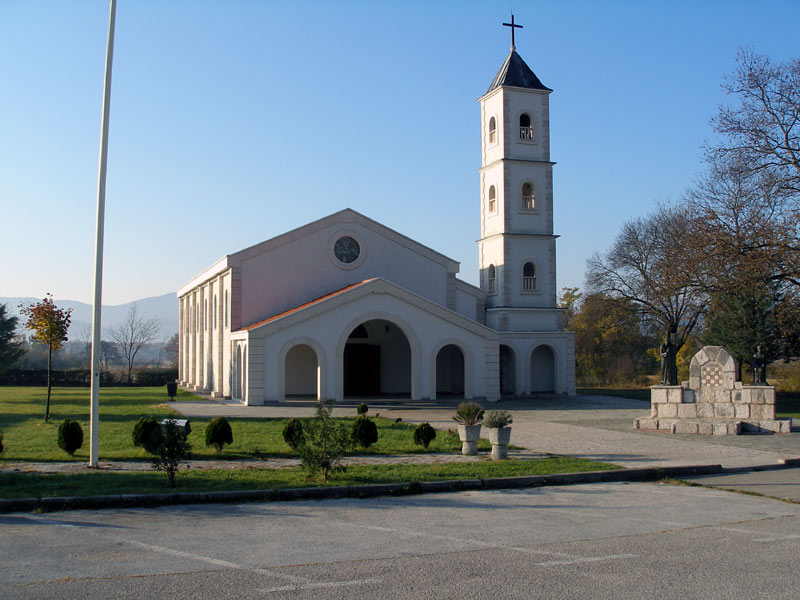
Church in Sovići

According to the ICTY, Croat/HVO forces attacked the villages of Doljani and Sovići, about 50 kilometres north of Mostar in the morning on 17 April 1993. The attack was part of a larger Croatian Defence Forces offensive aimed at taking Jablanica, the area's main Bosnian Muslim dominated town. The HVO commanders had calculated that they needed two days to take Jablanica. Sovići's geopolitical location was strategically significant for the HVO as it was en route to Jablanica. For the Bosnian Army, it was a gateway to the plateau of Risovac, which could create conditions for further progression towards the Adriatic coast.

The larger HVO offensive on Jablanica had already started on 15 April 1993. The artillery destroyed the upper part of Sovići. The Bosnian Army fought back, but at about 5 p.m., the Bosnian Army commander in Sovići surrendered, along with approximately 70 to 75 soldiers. At least 400 Bosnian Muslim civilians were detained and the HVO advance towards Jablanica was halted after a cease-fire agreement was negotiated; the advance of the Croatian Defence Council toward Jablanica was halted after the ceasefire agreement was reached.

Muslim houses in the area were burned, and mosques were systematically destroyed to ensure the Bosnian Muslim population would not return.

== Killings ==
Several captured Bosnian Muslims were tortured and killed by the Convicts' Battalion, a unit known for its cruelty to Bosnian Muslims. It was commanded by Mladen Naletilić Tuta. Some prisoners were transported to the Heliodrom camp or other camps such as the one in Ljubuški where they were beaten and mistreated.

After the Croatian Defence Council captured the villages, it killed 18 Bosniak detainees.

General Milivoj Petković attributed responsibility for Sovići and Doljani to Mate Boban.
