= Govedovići, Trnovo =

Govedovići Говедићи
- Village
- Location within Bosnia and Herzegovina
- Coordinates: 43°41′34″N 18°29′38″E
- Country: Bosnia and Herzegovina
- Entity: Republika Srpska
- Municipality: Trnovo
- Time zone: UTC+1 (CET)
  - Summer (DST): UTC+2 (CEST)

Govedovići (Serbian Cyrillic: Говедићи) is a village in the municipality of Trnovo, Republika Srpska, Bosnia and Herzegovina.
