= Tošići =

Tošići Тошићи
- Village
- Location within Bosnia and Herzegovina
- Coordinates: 43°38′52″N 18°26′34″E
- Country: Bosnia and Herzegovina
- Entity: Republika Srpska
- Municipality: Trnovo
- Time zone: UTC+1 (CET)
  - Summer (DST): UTC+2 (CEST)

Tošići (Serbian Cyrillic: Тошићи) is a village in the municipality of Trnovo, Republika Srpska, Bosnia and Herzegovina.
