= Mimar Hayruddin =

16th-century Ottoman architect

- Born: c. 1500
- Occupation: Architect
- Parent(s): Ustad Murad, father, also an architect
- Buildings: Stari Most; Complex of Sultan Bayezid II; Bayezid II Mosque

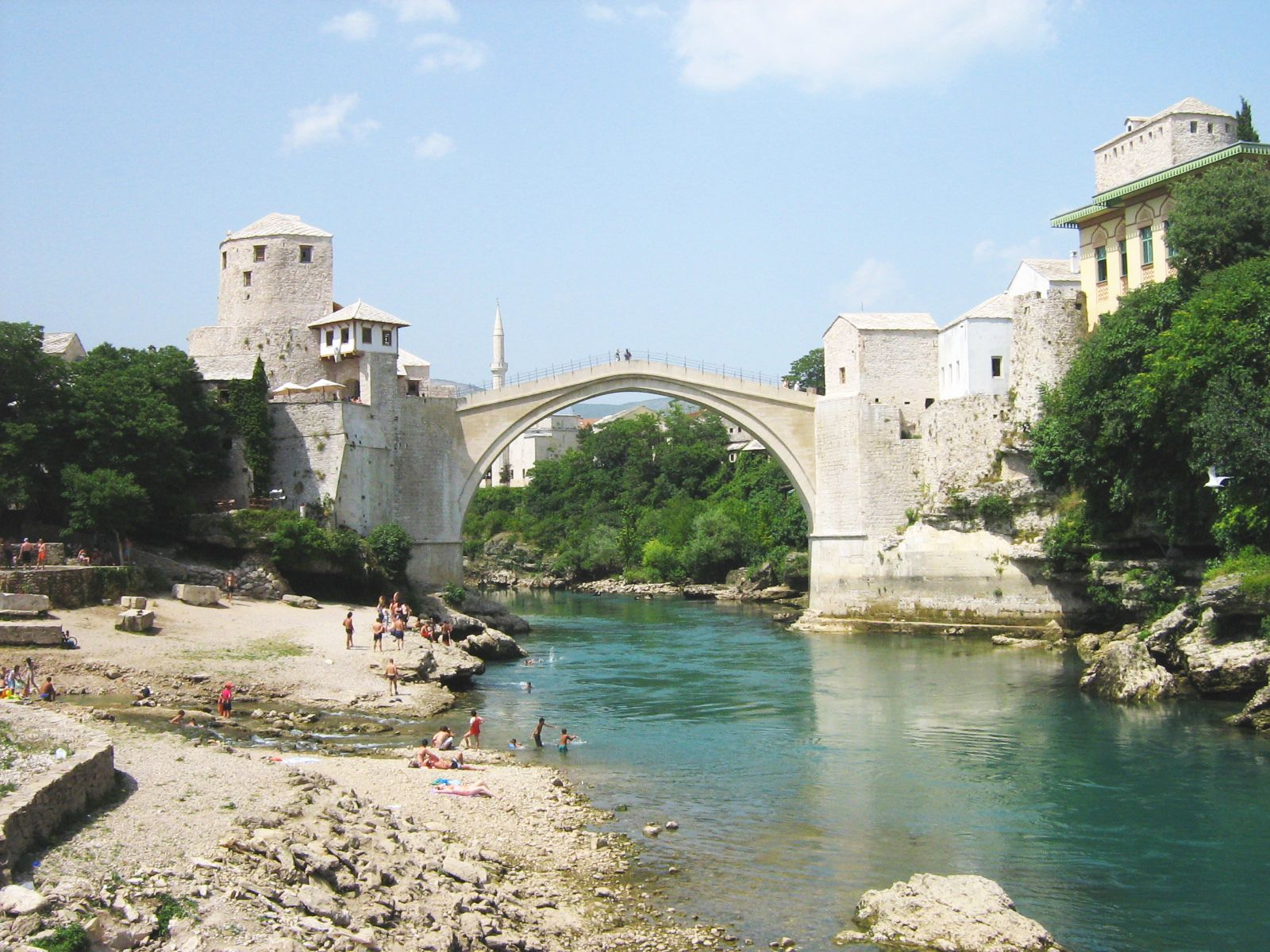
Stari Most, Mostar, Bosnia and Herzegovina

Mimar Hayruddin (Hayruddin the Architect; born c. 1500) was an Ottoman chief architect and civil engineer under the rule of Sultan Bayezid II (r. 1481–1512/AH 886–918) and Sultan Suleiman the Magnificent (r. 1520–66).

A student of the celebrated Ottoman architect Mimar Sinan, Hayruddin was responsible for the construction of the Stari Most (Mostar Bridge) in the city of Mostar in Bosnia and Herzegovina, the Bayezid II Mosque in Istanbul, the Külliye Complex of Sultan Bayezid II in Edirne, and another in the town of Amasya.

The Stari Most, in particular, is considered an exemplary piece of Balkan Islamic architecture. Legend has it that Hayruddin was convinced his design would fail and, after nine years of construction, prepared himself to die on the day the bridge was finally unveiled. Hayruddin's design was to endure until the destruction of the bridge by Croat forces in 1993. The bridge was reconstructed, with work taking place from June 2001 until the new bridge was unveiled on 23 July 2004, at a cost estimated to be some 15.5 million US dollars.

The Sultan Bayezid II complex is located on the banks of the Tunca River, consisting of a mosque, medical school, hospital and bathhouse, and in 2019 attracted some 7,000 tourists daily.

Mimar Hayrüddin is considered one of the founders of the classical Ottoman style of architecture.
