= Rajski Do =

Rajski Do Рајски До
- Village
- Location within Bosnia and Herzegovina
- Coordinates: 43°38′N 18°26′E
- Country: Bosnia and Herzegovina
- Entity: Republika Srpska
- Municipality: Trnovo
- Time zone: UTC+1 (CET)
  - Summer (DST): UTC+2 (CEST)

Rajski Do (Serbian Cyrillic: Рајски До) is a village in the municipality of Trnovo, Republika Srpska, Bosnia and Herzegovina.
