= Complex of Sultan Bayezid II =

Külliye located in Edrine

- II. Bayezid Külliyesi
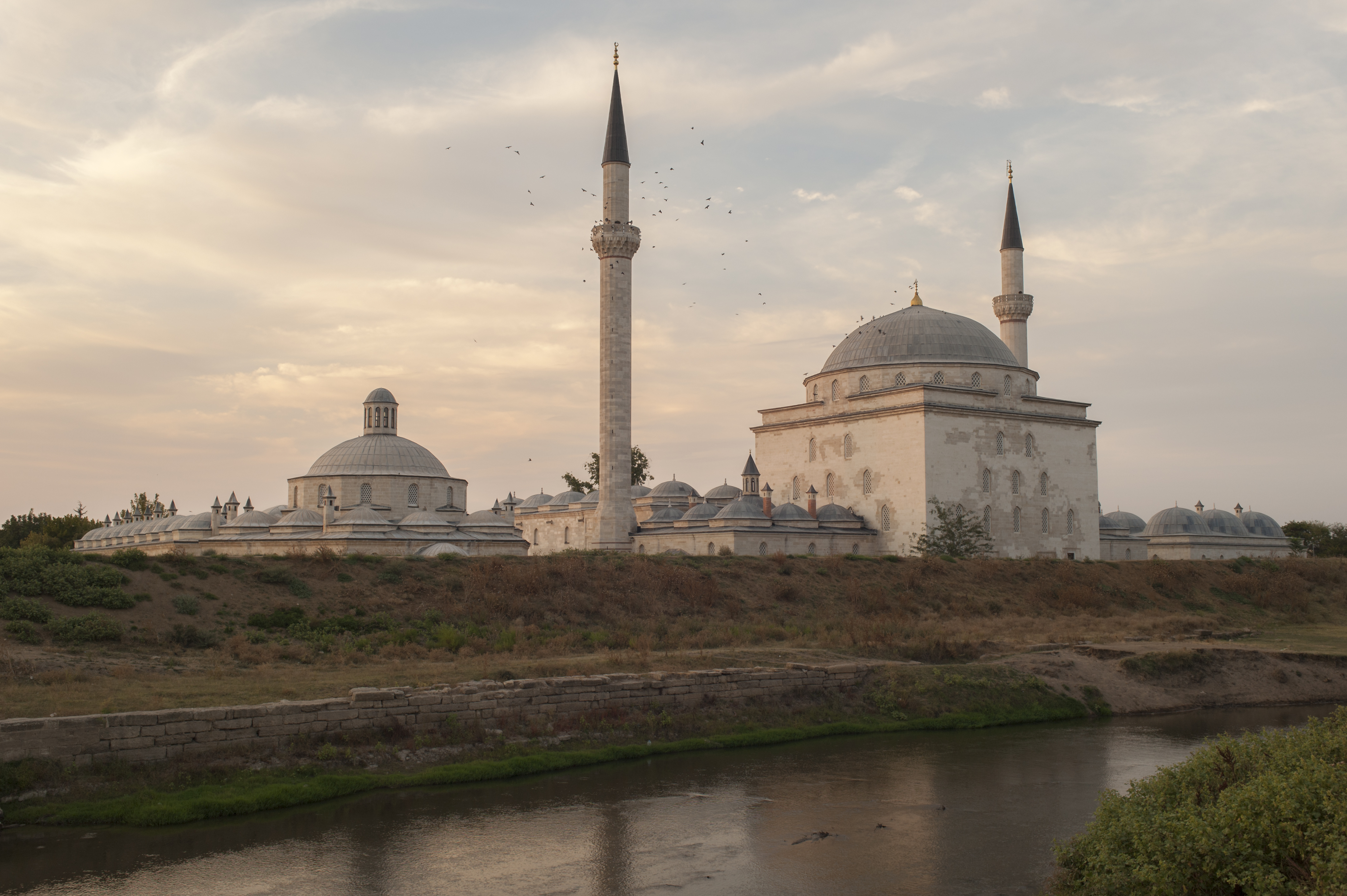

Religion
- Affiliation: Islam
- Status: Museum

Location
- Location: Edirne, Turkey
- Interactive map of Complex of Sultan Bayezid II
- Coordinates: 41°41′09″N 26°32′37″E

Architecture
- Architect: Mimar Hayruddin
- Type: Mosque
- Style: Islamic, Ottoman architecture
- Groundbreaking: 1484
- Completed: 1488
- Minaret: 2

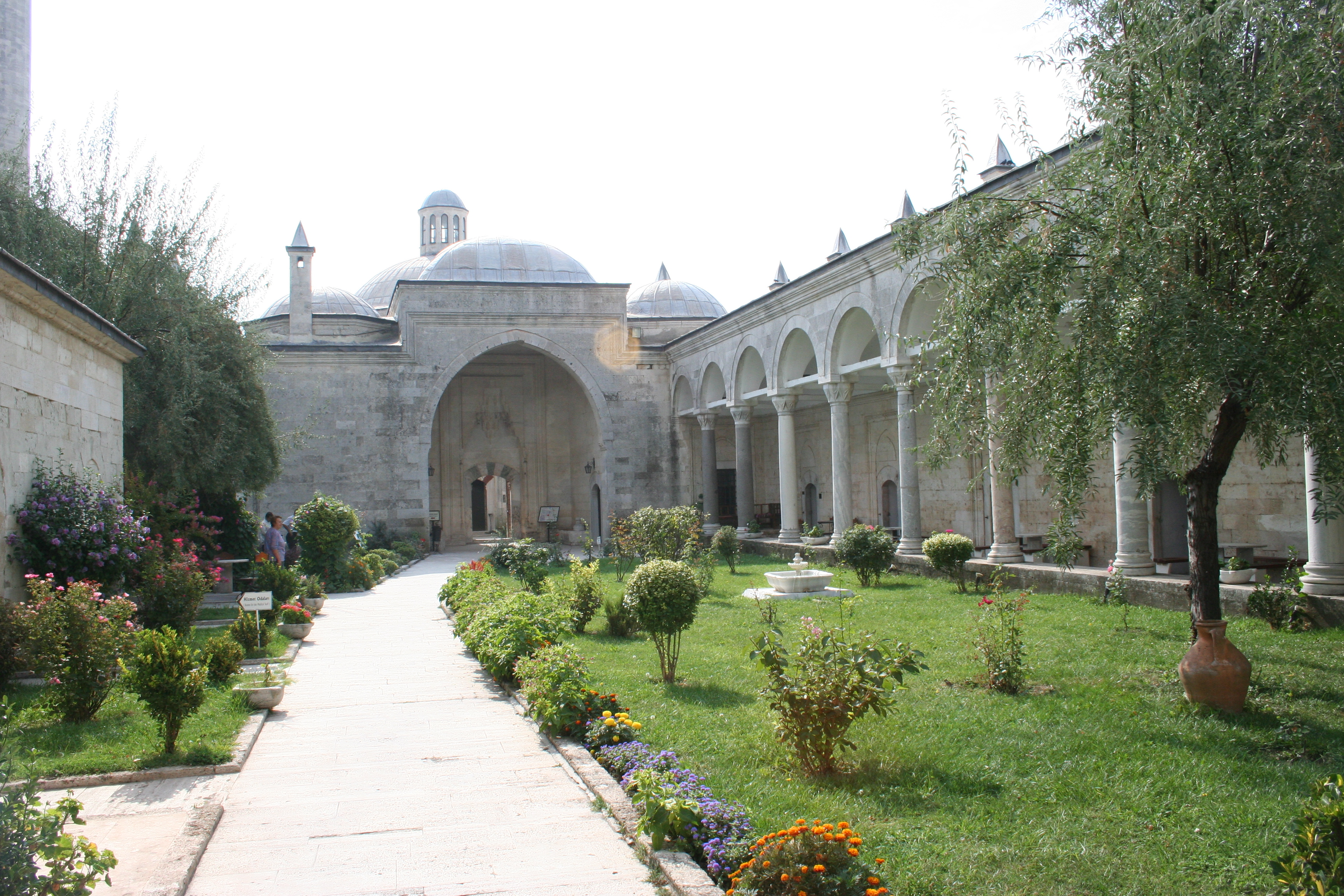
The inner courtyard of the darüşşifa

The Complex of Sultan Bayezid II (Turkish: Sultan II Bayezid Külliyesi) is a külliye located in Edirne, Turkey. It was built in 1488 by the Ottoman architect Mimar Hayruddin for the Sultan Bayezid II (reigned 1481–1512).

The complex contains a Dar al-Shifa (Turkish darüşşifa, "hospital, medical center"), and it remained in operation for four centuries from 1488 until the Russo-Turkish War (1877–78). The hospital was especially notable for its treatment methods for mental disorders, which included the use of music, water sound and scents.

The historic darüşşifa was incorporated into the structure of Edirne-based Trakya University in 1993, and converted into the Complex of Sultan Bayezid II Health Museum in 1997, a museum dedicated to the history of medicine and health matters in general. The complex was inscribed in the Tentative list of World Heritage Sites in Turkey in 2016.

== Mosque ==
Within the complex, the mosque holds a central position. The inner sanctum does not have arches nor columns and the ground is lined with a variety of Turkish rugs sometimes also called Anatolian rugs. It has the dimensions 20.58x20.60 meters making it square in shape. The mosques' dome has a height of 19.34 meters. The pulpit or minbar was created with stonemasonry craftsmanship. It has two minarets each having a single-balcony and 149 stairs leading up. Both sit at a height of 38.50 meters. Within the mosque, the array of arched windows that surround the mihrab would have let light fall on the faces of worshippers.

== Hospital (Dârüşşifâ) ==
The darussifa stands on just right side of the mosque consisting of three different sections. The first courtyard holds six outpatient rooms, service rooms such as a kitchen, a laundry, and pharmacy. In the second courtyard, senior staff carried out their duties in four rooms. The şifa-hane (cure-house) is an inpatient section that holds 10 rooms in total, six of which are for the winter season and the remaining four for summer- this section also had a music stage. The utilization of music and the sounds of water from the fountain were intended to serve as therapeutic aids for mentally ill patients.

== Medical school ==
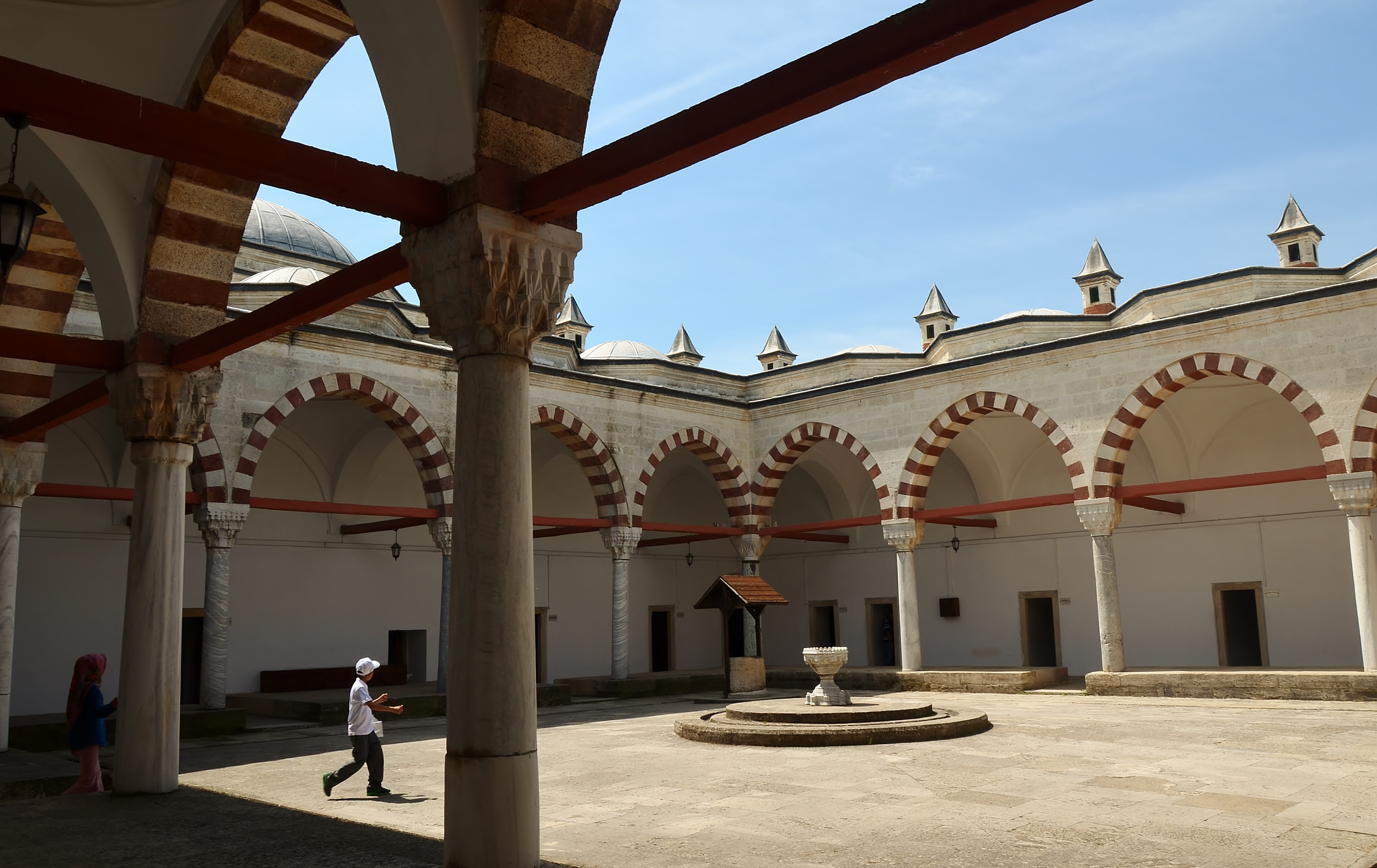
Courtyard of the historic Medical school.

The health institution was a medical school (Ottoman Turkish: Medrese-i Etibba). It ranked among the best 60 schools (madrasa) in the Ottoman Empire due to its high-paid scholar.

The medical school consisted of 18 student rooms and a classroom surrounding three sides of a courtyard with a shadirvan (fountain) in the middle. The first teacher of the school is said to have been Sheikh Lütfullahzade Bahaüddin. Famous Ottoman travel writer Evliya Çelebi (1611–after 1682) mentions in his book that the students of the medical school were mature physicians, who studied and discussed works of Ancient Greek philosophers, scientists and physicians such as Plato (428/427 or 424/423–348/347 BC), Socrates (470/469–399 BC), Philip of Opus, Aristotle (384–322 BC), Galen (AD 129– c. 200/c. 216) and Pythagoras (c. 570 – c. 495 BC). The physicians, each being a specialist in a different field, tried to find out the best treatment by studying valuable scientific literature on medicine. The books of the medical school are archived in the hand-written books library of Selimiye Mosque today.

According to Evliya Çelebi, following daily wages were paid to the staff and students:

- Scholar (1): 60 akçe (silver coin) including holidays,
- Assistant (1): 7 akçe
- Library clerk (1): 2 akçe
- Servants (2): 2 akçe
- Students (18): 2 akçe. in addition to meeting of all their needs.

== Other Sections of the Complex ==
=== Hamam (Turkish bathhouse) ===
Today, the structure has fallen into disrepair, with its original foundations obscured. Historical photographs indicate its proximity to the bridge base within the complex. Architecturally, it exhibits characteristics of a double bath design where revenue generated from the hamam contributed to the complex's overall maintenance.

=== Imaret (Soup kitchen) ===
Part of the complex was utilized as a soup kitchen or imaret where meals were offered twice a day This one in particular is also called “New Imaret (Turkish: Yeni İmaret)” because of being the last of 8 imarets in Edirne. All staff of the complex and the poor ate here free of charge.

== Gallery ==
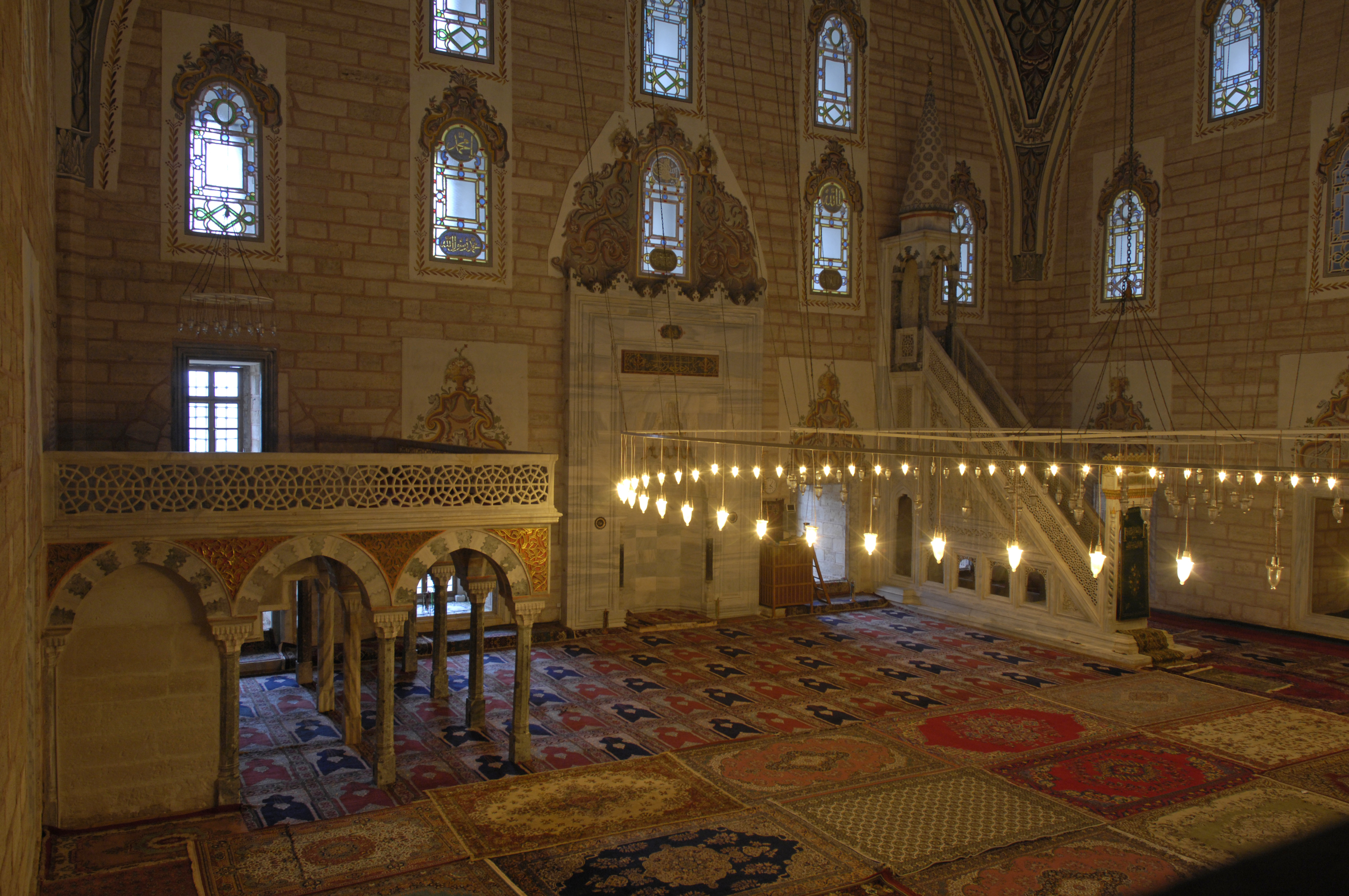
Interior of mosque from balcony

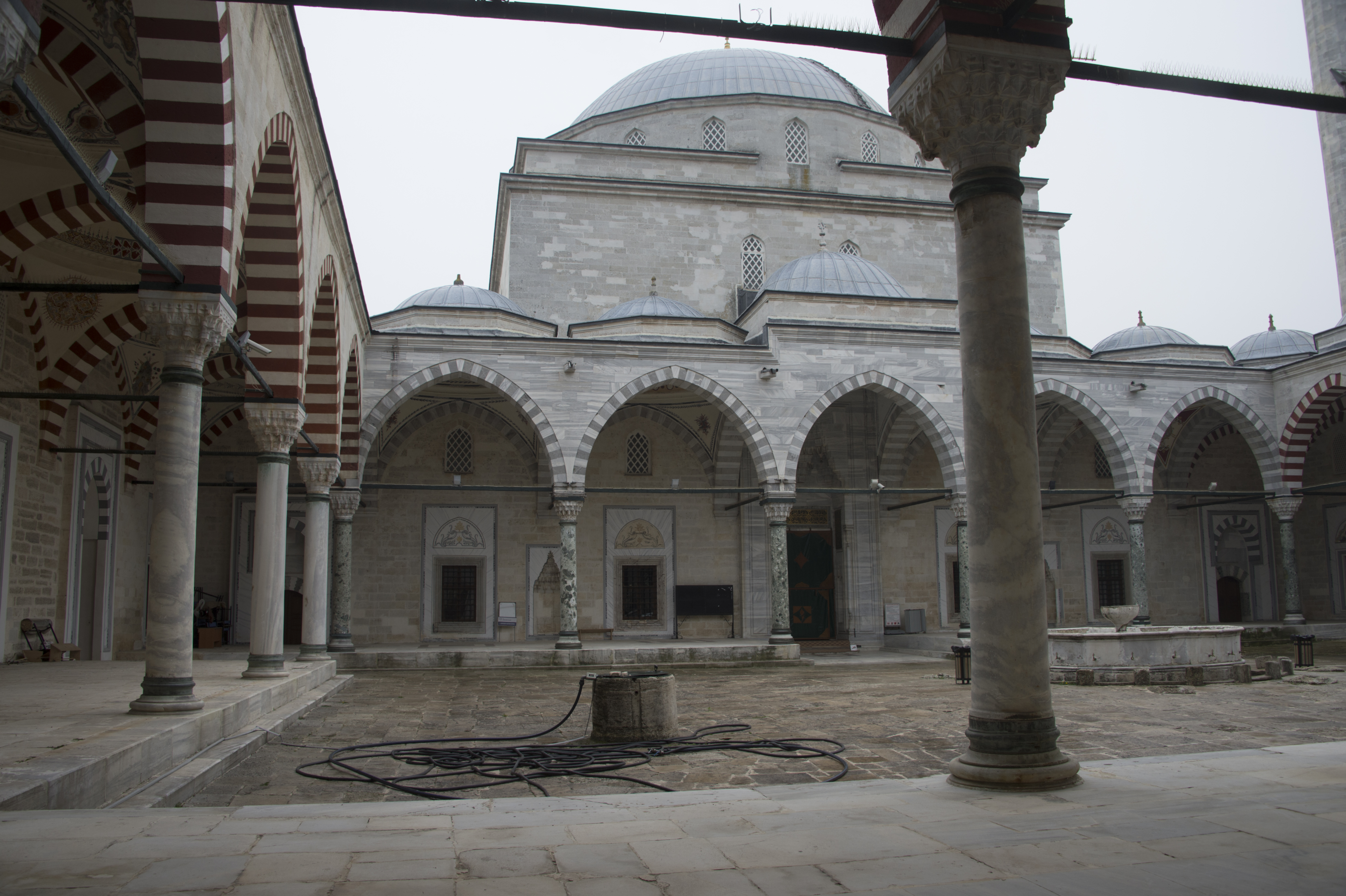
Courtyard of the mosque

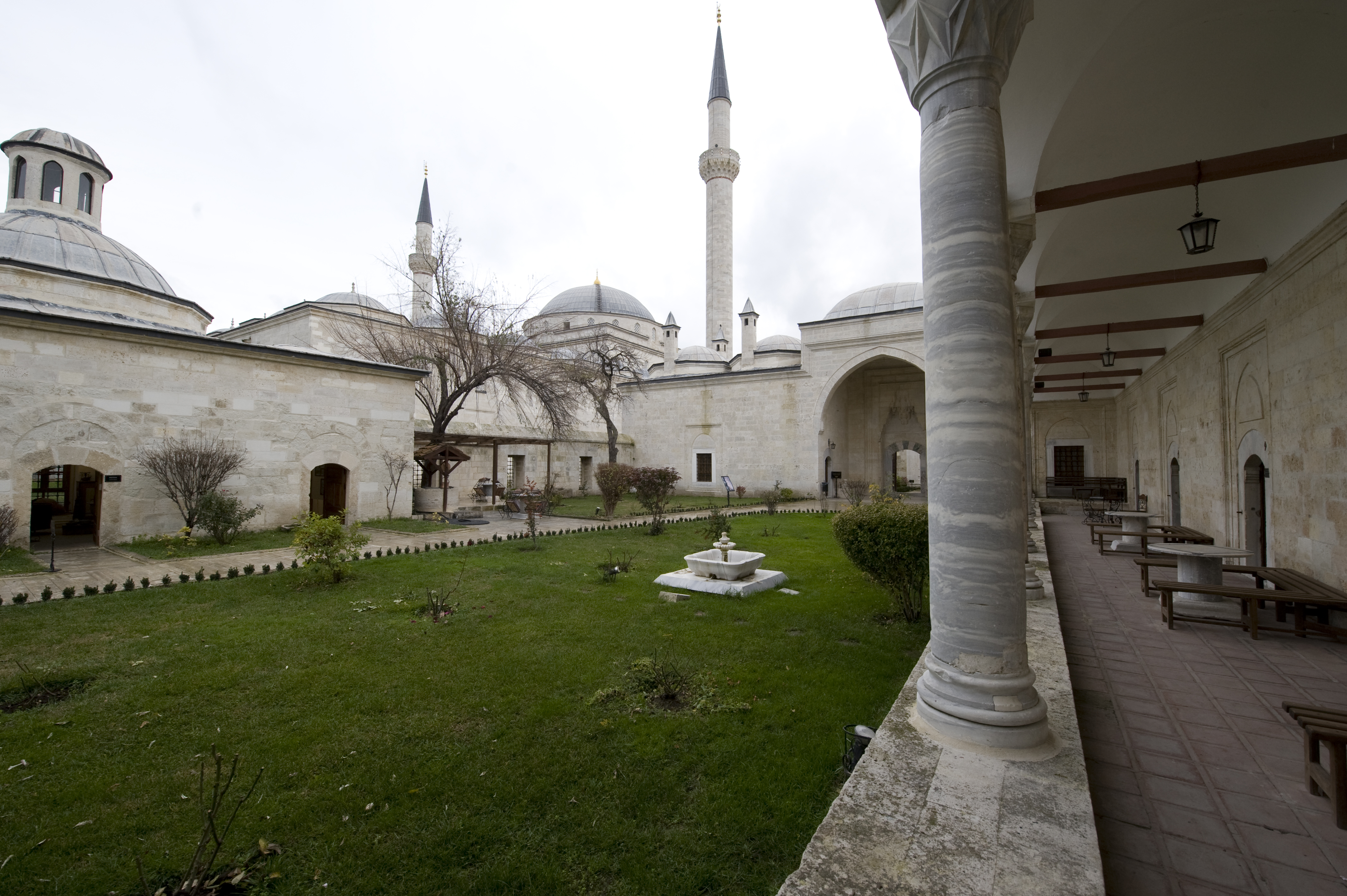
A courtyard in the museum area
