= Jablanica, Lopare =

Jablanica Јабланица
- Village
- Location within Bosnia and Herzegovina
- Coordinates: 44.6318787°N 18.74819°E
- Country: Bosnia and Herzegovina
- Entity: Republika Srpska
- Region: Bijeljina
- Municipality: Lopare

Area
  - Total: 9.92 sq mi (25.69 km^{2})

Population (2013)
  - Total: 889
  - Density: 89.6/sq mi (34.6/km^{2})
- Time zone: UTC+1 (CET)
  - Summer (DST): UTC+2 (CEST)

Jablanica is a village in the municipality of Lopare (Republika Srpska), Bosnia and Herzegovina.

== Demographics ==
According to the 2013 census, its population was 889, all of them living in the Lopare part, thus none in Čelić.

Ethnicity in 2013
Ethnicity	Number	Percentage
Serbs	879	98.9%
Croats	4	0.4%
Bosniaks	2	0.2%
other/undeclared	4	0.4%
Total	889	100%
