= Široki Brijeg Convicts' Battalion =

- Širokobriješka Kažnjenička bojna
- Patch of the battalion
- Active: 15 June 1991–1995
- Allegiance: Herzeg-Bosnia
- Type: Special-purpose battalion
- Size: 846 (November 1993)
- Nickname: Tuta's Convicts' Battalion
- Engagements: Bosnian War; Operation Jackal; Battle of Sovići and Doljani

Commanders
- Notable commanders: Mladen Naletilić Tuta

The Široki Brijeg Convicts' Battalion (Croatian: Širokobriješka Kažnjenička bojna), commonly referred to as just the Convicts' Battalion, was a special-purpose battalion of the Croatian Defence Council headquartered in Široki Brijeg during the Bosnian War. Its main commander was Mladen Naletilić Tuta.

== History ==
The Convicts' Battalion was formed by Mladen Naletilić Tuta on June 15, 1991. According to Tuta, it was called the Convicts' Battalion because it was organized by people who had been politically persecuted during the socialist Yugoslavia. The battalion had its headquarters in the Tobacco Station in Široki Brijeg.

During Operation Jackal, the Convicts' Battalion took control over Orlovac Hill, the SOKO military complex, the Aluminij Combine and the JNA barracks in Rodoč. Today the barracks are named after Stanislav "Baja" Kraljević, a soldier of the battalion who was killed during the barracks' capture. On June 25, 1992, the battalion, along with others, successfully captured the repeater at the top of Velež, which ended the operation.

After the successful operation in Mostar, the battalion became more popular and the number of soldiers increased to 80–100. In April 1993, it participated in the Battle of Sovići and Doljani in Jablanica after which it committed war crimes against the Bosniak population of the villages. According to a salary list of the battalion from November 1993, it had 846 soldiers in total.

The Convicts' Battalion was later incorporated into the 2nd HVO Guard Brigade.
