= Jablanica, Trnovo =

Jablanica Јабланица
- Village
- Location within Bosnia and Herzegovina
- Coordinates: 43°44′33″N 18°24′35″E
- Country: Bosnia and Herzegovina
- Entity: Republika Srpska
- Municipality: Trnovo
- Time zone: UTC+1 (CET)
  - Summer (DST): UTC+2 (CEST)

Jablanica (Serbian Cyrillic: Јабланица) is a village in the municipality of Trnovo, Republika Srpska, Bosnia and Herzegovina.
