= Jablanica, Maglaj =

Village in Maglaj, Bosnia and Herzegovina

Jablanica
- Village
- Location within Bosnia and Herzegovina
- Country: Bosnia and Herzegovina
- Entity: Federation of Bosnia and Herzegovina
- Canton: Zenica-Doboj
- Municipality: Maglaj

Area
  - Total: 3.68 sq mi (9.54 km^{2})

Population (2013)
  - Total: 864
  - Density: 235/sq mi (90.6/km^{2})
- Time zone: UTC+1 (CET)
  - Summer (DST): UTC+2 (CEST)

Jablanica is a village in the municipality of Maglaj, Bosnia and Herzegovina.

== Demographics ==
According to the 2013 census, its population was 864.

Ethnicity in 2013
Ethnicity	Number	Percentage
Bosniaks	798	92.4%
Serbs	57	6.6%
other/undeclared	9	1.0%
Total	864	100%
