= Jablanica, Rožaje =

Jablanica Јабланица
- Village
- Location within Montenegro
- Country: Montenegro
- Municipality: Rožaje

Population (2011)
  - Total: 471
- Time zone: UTC+1 (CET)
  - Summer (DST): UTC+2 (CEST)

Jablanica (Serbian Cyrillic: Јабланица) is a village in the municipality of Rožaje, Montenegro. It is located close to the Serbian border.

== Demographics ==
According to the 2011 census, its population was 471.

Ethnicity in 2011
Ethnicity	Number	Percentage
Bosniaks	420	89.2%
Albanians	16	3.4%
other/undeclared	35	7.4%
Total	471	100%
