= Krupa (Neretva) =

Krupa Крупа
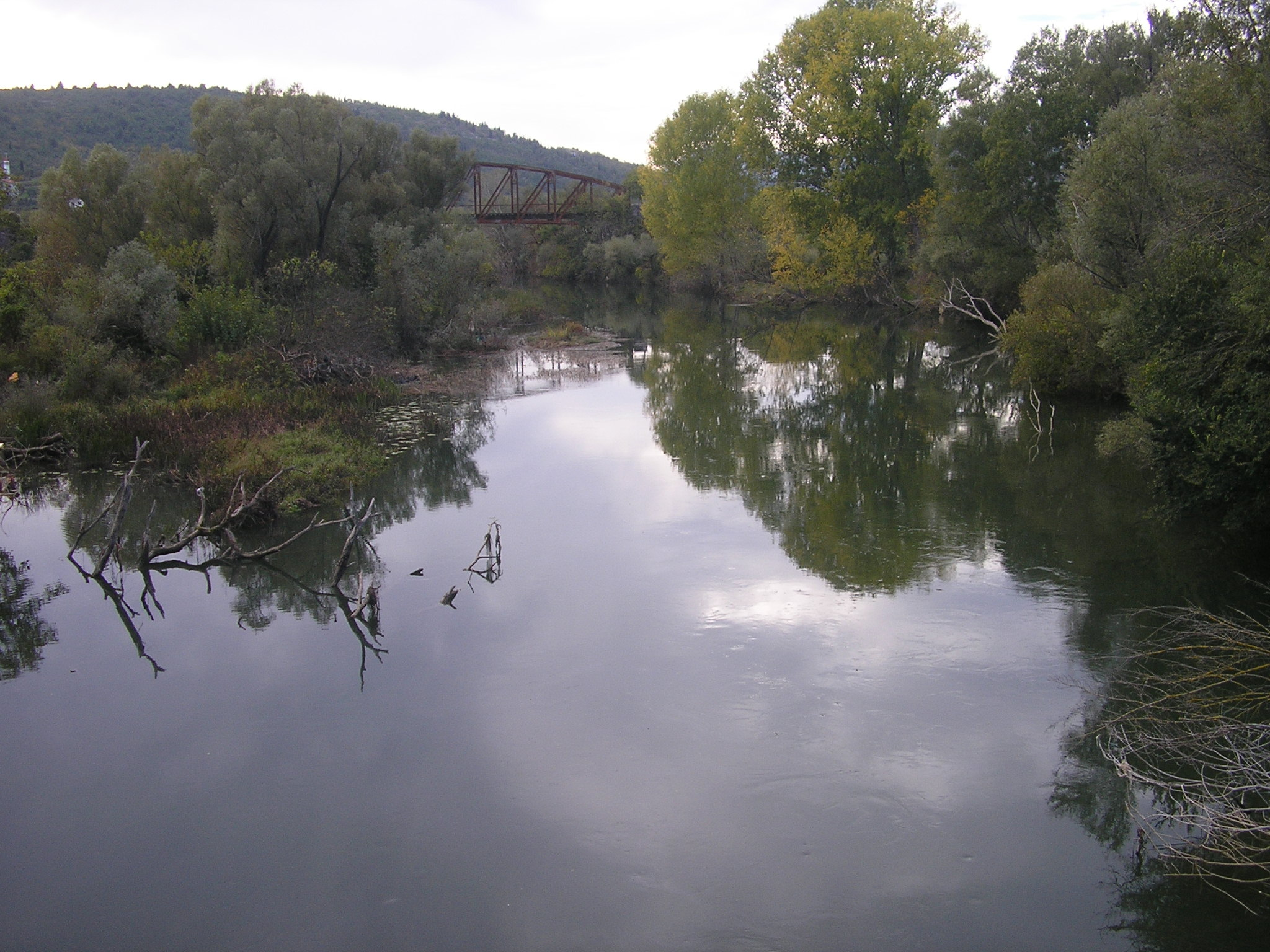
- Krupa river near Dračevo

- Location within Bosnia and Herzegovina

Location
- Country: Bosnia and Herzegovina
- Municipality: Čapljina

Physical characteristics
- Source
  - location: Deransko Lake
- Mouth
  - location: Neretva
  - coordinates: 43.0547°N 17.6974°E
- Length: 9 km (5.6 mi)

Basin features
- Progression: Neretva→ Adriatic Sea

The Krupa (Serbian Cyrillic: Крупа) river is a left tributary of the river Neretva and the main water current of Hutovo Blato, which leads the waters from Gornje Blato and Svitavsko Lake into the Neretva river near Dračevo. The length of Krupa is 9 km with an average depth of 5 meters. The Krupa is an extension and outlet of Deransko Lake. Also, the Krupa is a unique river in Europe, because the river flows both ways. It flows normally from the source to the mouth and from the mouth to the source. This happens when, due to high water levels and large quantities of water, the Neretva pushes the Krupa river in the opposite direction. The river has rich biodiversity, with numerous fish species endemic to the Neretva basin inhabiting Krupa and its lakes. It is observed that important Salmo marmoratus, known under its vernacular name as glavatica and/or gonjavac, and endemic to the handful of rivers of the Adriatic watershed, enters these waters to spawn.

== See also ==
- Bregava
- Hutovo Blato
