= Svitavsko Lake =

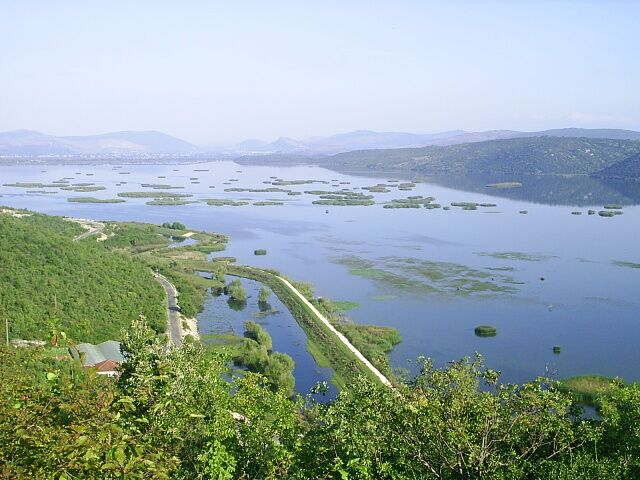
- Svitavsko Lake

- Location within Bosnia and Herzegovina
- Interactive map of Svitavsko Lake
- Location: Bosnia and Herzegovina
- Coordinates: 43.024126°N 17.784023°E
- Primary inflows: Trebišnjica
- Primary outflows: Krupa river (tributary of Neretva river)
- Basin countries: Bosnia and Herzegovina
- Settlements: Svitava

Svitavsko Lake (Serbo-Croatian: Svitavsko jezero) is semi-artificial lake in Bosnia and Herzegovina, between village Svitava and Neretva river. The lake is a part of Hutovo Blato complex of marshes, lakes, underground karstic wellsprings and rivers, that form the "Hutovo Blato" Nature Park.

== See also ==
- List of lakes in Bosnia and Herzegovina
- Deransko Lake
- Krupa (Neretva)
- Desilo
