= Mediterranean wetlands =

Mediterranean Wetlands comprise the wetlands of the Mediterranean region.

Wetlands are ubiquitous and they may briefly be defined as transitional spaces between land and water. In a more detailed sense, according to the Ramsar Convention on Wetlands, wetlands are defined as:

"areas of marsh, fen, peat land or water, whether natural or artificial, permanent or temporary, with water that is static or flowing, fresh, brackish or salt, including areas of marine water the depth of which at low tide does not exceed six metres […..] and may incorporate riparian and coastal zones adjacent to the wetlands, and islands or bodies of marine water deeper than six metres at low tide lying within the wetlands".

The Ramsar Classification of wetland types includes 42 types which can be broadly divided into:

- Marine and coastal wetlands
- Inland wetlands
- Human-made wetlands

Among the richest ecosystems in the world, wetlands have an exceptional value, but are also the most threatened. In the Mediterranean, they support high concentrations of birds, mammals, reptiles, amphibians, fish and invertebrate species that cannot be found anywhere else in the world.

== Key figures on biodiversity in Med region ==
Furthermore, these ecosystems insure directly – and for free – services for millions of people. As natural infrastructures, they play a number of roles in the environment, principally water purification, flood control, carbon sink and shoreline stability.

Unfortunately, wetlands continue to be among the world's most threatened ecosystems; 50% of the Mediterranean wetlands disappeared during the 20th century, and those that remain have been degraded or artificialized. There are 15 to 22 million hectares of wetlands in the Mediterranean Region, a fourth of which are artificial, such as dam reservoirs and fish-farming ponds.

The Mediterranean region is also a hotspot of global biodiversity, but the greatest direct threat to that biodiversity is the disappearance of these ecosystems. Plants and animals combined, one out of three Mediterranean wetland species is endangered.

A scientific survey of 314 Mediterranean coastal wetlands shows that human activities, such as agriculture, have converted 71% of Mediterranean natural coastal wetland habitat into farmland, 21% by artificialization, and 8% by urban expansion.

One of the greatest threats to the Mediterranean wetlands is water extraction. Irrigated agriculture is the greatest water consumer in the region, accounting for 2/3 of total consumption. Rivers flow rates are falling due to water extraction, retention by dams, and the effects of climate change.

== Types of Mediterranean Wetlands ==
Wetlands lie at the interface between land and water, and are thus very diverse. The Ramsar Convention classified wetlands into three main types:

- Marine/coastal
  - Brackish lagoons
  - Estuaries and deltas
  - Chotts
  - Sabkhas
  - Dayas
  - Garaet
- Continental
  - Salt and brackish marshes
  - Freshwater marshes
  - Natural lakes
  - Temporary pools
  - Riparian woodlands
  - Peat-bogs
  - Wadis
  - Gueltas
- Artificial
  - Saltpans
  - Fishponds
  - Reservoirs
  - Temporary pools
  - Ricefields
  - Oases

== Regions in the Mediterranean Basin ==
The Mediterranean region is unique because of its special type of climate and its very long history of human use. Wetlands in the Mediterranean Basin are varied, and there are many different types in every country. For example:

- Africa
  - Algeria (Chott Ech Chergui)
  - Egypt (Wadi El Rayan Protected Area)
  - Libya (Ain Elzarga)
  - Morocco (Oasis du Tafilalet)
  - Tunisia (Chott El Jerid)
- Asia
  - Israel (Hula Nature Reserve)
  - Jordan (Azraq Oasis)
  - Lebanon (Palm Islands Nature Reserve)
  - Syrian Arab Republic (Sabkhat al-Jabbul Nature Reserve)
- Europe
  - Albania (Lake Shkodra and River Buna)
  - Bosnia and Herzegovina (Livanjsko Polje: Livno Karst field and Hutovo Blato)
  - Bulgaria (Belene Islands Complex)
  - Croatia (Lonjsko polje and Mokro polje including Krapje Dol)
  - Cyprus (Larnaca Salt Lake)
  - France (Camargue)
  - Greece (Messolonghi lagoons)
  - Italy (Valli residue del comprensorio di Comacchio)
  - Macedonia (Lake Prespa)
  - Malta (Ghadira)
  - Monaco (Réserve sous-marine du Larvotto)
  - Montenegro (Skadarsko Jezero)
  - Portugal (Estuário do Sado)
  - Serbia (Gornje Podunavlje)
  - Slovenia (Lake Cerknica & its environs)
  - Spain (Doñana)
  - Turkey (Lake Burdur)

== Values of Mediterranean Wetlands ==
Man benefits from wetlands' natural functions and services, which help to meet the needs of millions of people – to cultivate soil, to fish for food, to cut trees for building, to hunt the waterfowl for leisure activities, to organize ecotourism programs in remarkable sites, to use their water for our domestic or agricultural needs, etc.

- Cultural value

Some cultural values developed in wetland areas are non-material and have become part of the life cycle and livelihood of local residents, such as rituals, beliefs, the seasonal work calendar, and different traditional techniques.

- Ecological value

The Mediterranean wetlands have a high percentage of endemic species. They not only provide breeding and wintering for millions of birds, they also play a role as a stopping place for an even larger number of birds during migration periods.

- Economic value

Environmental economics assumes that by giving a monetary value to nature, it would allow us to better take into account its importance in development choices. The Millennium Ecosystem Assessment gave wetlands a value of US$15 trillion in 1997.

- Hydrological value

Wetlands greatly influence the flow and quality of water, thus providing benefits to humans. They store and slowly release surface water, rain, snowmelt and flood waters, maintaining soil humidity during dry periods. But the most important service is the supply of clean water for drinking, agriculture, and industries. Scientists have estimated that a 2,500 acre wetland in Georgia saves $1 million in water pollution control costs annually (OTA 1993).

== Pressures on Mediterranean Wetlands ==
Despite all the services they provide to human societies, Mediterranean wetlands continue to face many pressures from human activities. Their loss and degradation, started centuries ago, are often considered to be an unfortunate but unavoidable effect of the human development process and needs.

These negative impacts result from a number of pressures such as agriculture, urbanization, industry, fishing, tourism development, energy, transport and hunting. Each kind of pressure may impact several types of wetland services. For example, agricultural development may impact wetland surfaces, hydraulic regimes, water quality, and wetland types/ landscapes.

== The Ramsar Convention and the Mediterranean Wetlands Initiative ==
The Convention on Wetlands, called the Ramsar Convention, is an intergovernmental treaty concerning the wetlands. Ramsar's 15 regional initiatives support cooperation and capacity-building on wetland-related issues in specific regions or sub-regions. There are two types of regional initiatives: Ramsar Regional Centres for training and capacity building, and networks for regional cooperation. In 2016 there are 15 Ramsar Regional Initiatives covering regions of the Mediterranean, Asia, Africa and South America. Those regional networks provide a platform for collaboration between governments, technical experts, international NGOs, local communities and private companies.

The Mediterranean Wetland Observatory (MWO) was established in 2008 at the request of the Mediterranean Wetlands Committee (MedWet/Com) as a multi-partner project coordinated by Tour du Valat (TdV), the Research Institute for the Conservation of Mediterranean Wetlands, based in Arles, France. Founded more than 50 years ago by Luc Hoffmann, the Tour du Valat has since then developed its research activities for the conservation of Mediterranean wetlands with a major mission: "Better understanding of wetlands for better management".

The main objective of the MWO is to act as a wetland management tool serving the MedWet Initiative's countries. The ultimate aim of this regional tool, in collaboration with MedWet, is to help to improve political decisions regarding the conservation and sustainable management of wetlands, particularly in terms of legislation, governance and best practices.
