= Hutovo Blato =

Protected area and Ramsar site, Bosnia and Herzegovina

- IUCN category III (natural monument or feature)
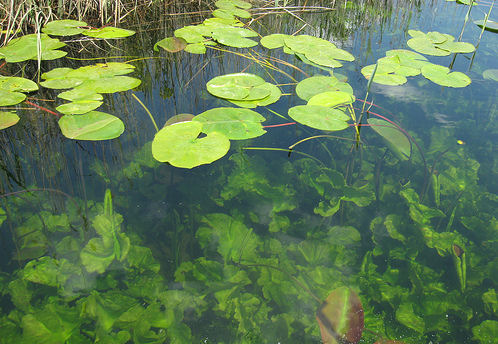
- Crystal clear, cold water of this unusual kind of marsh, Hutovo Blato Nature Park, Bosnia and Herzegovina.

- Location within Bosnia and Herzegovina
- Interactive map of Hutovo Blato
- Location: Herzegovina-Neretva Canton, Bosnia and Herzegovina
- Coordinates: 43.06°N 17.79°E
- Area: 78.24 km^{2} (30.21 sq mi)
- Designation

Ramsar Wetland
- Official name: Hutovo Blato Wetland
- Designated: 24 Sep 2001
- Reference no.: 1105
- Established: 1995
- Visitors: Open all year (in Open all year)
- Operator: Hutovo Blato Public Enterprise
- Website: Hutovo Blato Nature Park

Hutovo Blato is a nature reserve and bird reserve located in Bosnia and Herzegovina. It is primarily composed of marshlands that were created by the underground aquifer system of the Krupa River. It is fed from the limestone massif of Ostrvo that divides the Deransko Lake and Svitavsko Lake. The reserve is on the list of BirdLife International's Important Bird Areas. It is the largest reserve of its kind in the region, in terms of both size and diversity. It is home to over 240 types of migratory birds and dozens that make their permanent home in the sub-Mediterranean wetlands surrounding Deransko Lake. In the migration season, tens of thousands of birds fill the lake and its surroundings.

== Wetlands ==
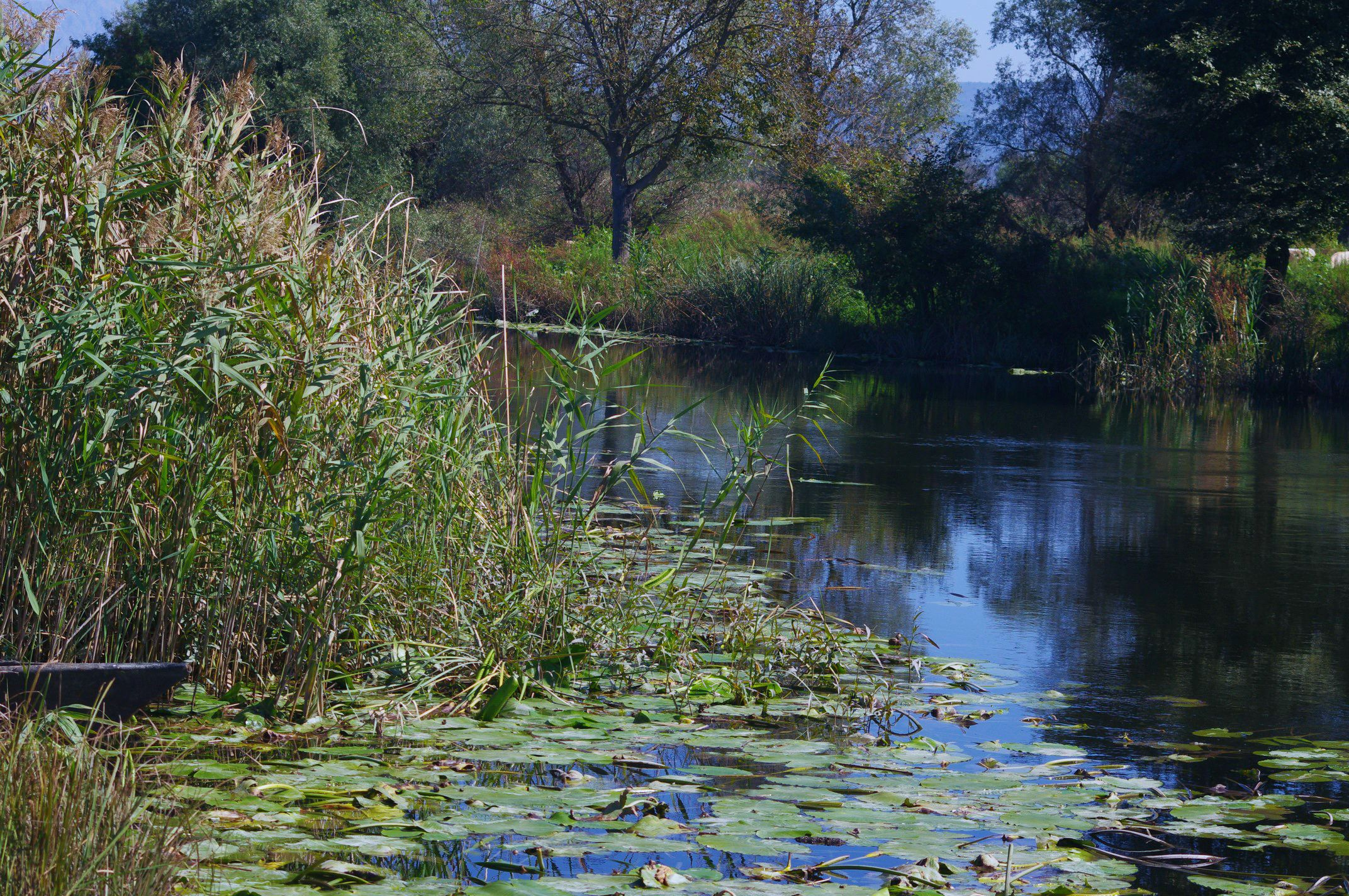
Hutovo Blato marsh

The valley along the last 30 km of the Neretva River, and the river itself, comprise a remarkable landscape. Downstream from the confluence of its tributaries, the Trebižat and Bregava rivers, the valley spreads into an alluvial fan covering 20,000 hectares. The upper valley, the 7,411 hectares in Bosnia and Herzegovina, is called Hutovo Blato.

=== Ramsar site ===
Neretva Delta has been recognised as a Ramsar site since 1992, and Hutovo Blato since 2001. Both areas form one integrated Ramsar site that is a natural entity divided by the state border. The Important Bird Areas programme, conducted by BirdLife International, covers protected areas in Croatia and Bosnia and Herzegovina.

=== Hutovo Blato Nature Park ===
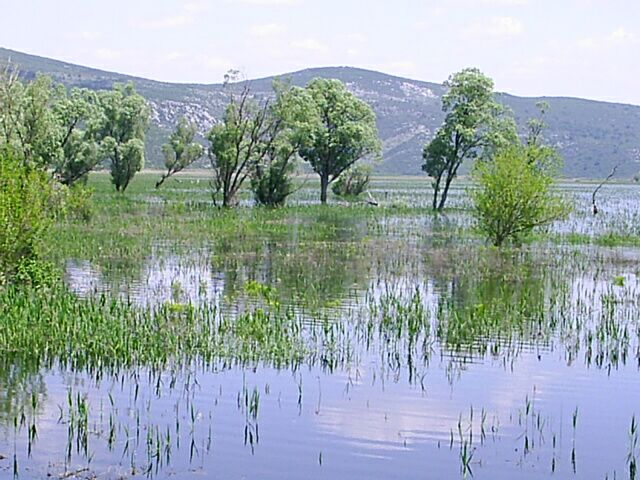
Gornje Blato – Deransko Lake

Since 1995, Hutovo Blato has been protected as a Hutovo Blato Nature Park and managed by a public authority. The whole zone is well protected from human impact and functions as an important habitat for many plants and animals . Historical site, Old Fortress Hutovo Blato, is located in the area of Nature Park. Nature Park "Hutovo Blato" is located in the South-Western part of Bosnia and Herzegovina, 30 km from City of Mostar and near the Croatian border. It stretches over an area of about 7,411 ha and represents one of the richest wetland reserves in Europe. Until 1995, when the cantonal protected area was founded, Hutovo Blato represented well-known area mainly for its hunting and fishing tourism. Every winter over 200 species of birds find their shelter inside this untouched nature. Visitors can enjoy relaxation, recreational activities in nature, sport-fishing, cycling and main tourist attraction – photo safari. There is also an educational path providing information of park and for rising environmental awareness and need for preservation of natural heritage in Nature park "Hutovo Blato".

==== Gornje Blato – Deransko Lake ====
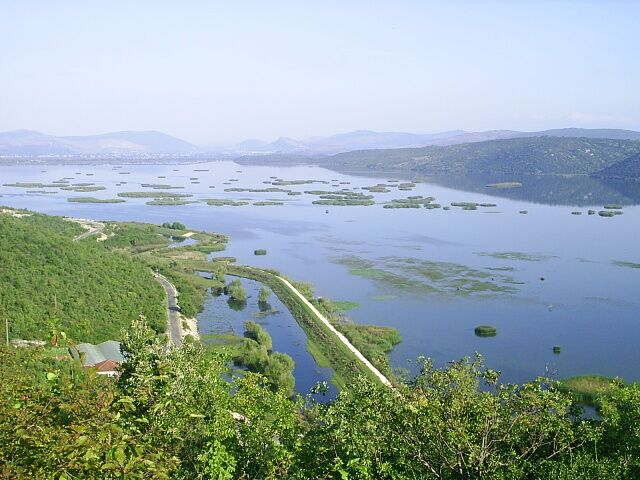
Donje Blato – Svitavsko Lake

The part of the park which kept its original form and almost untouched nature. Gornje Blato-Deransko Lake is supplied by the karstic water sources of the Trebišnjica river, emerging in the proximity of the bordering hills. It is hydro-geologically connected to the Neretva river through its effluent, the Krupa river, formed out of 5 lakes (Škrka, Deranja, Jelim, Orah, Drijen) and by large portions permanently flooded, also isolated by wide groves of reedbebds and trees, thus representing the most interesting preserved area.

==== Krupa River ====
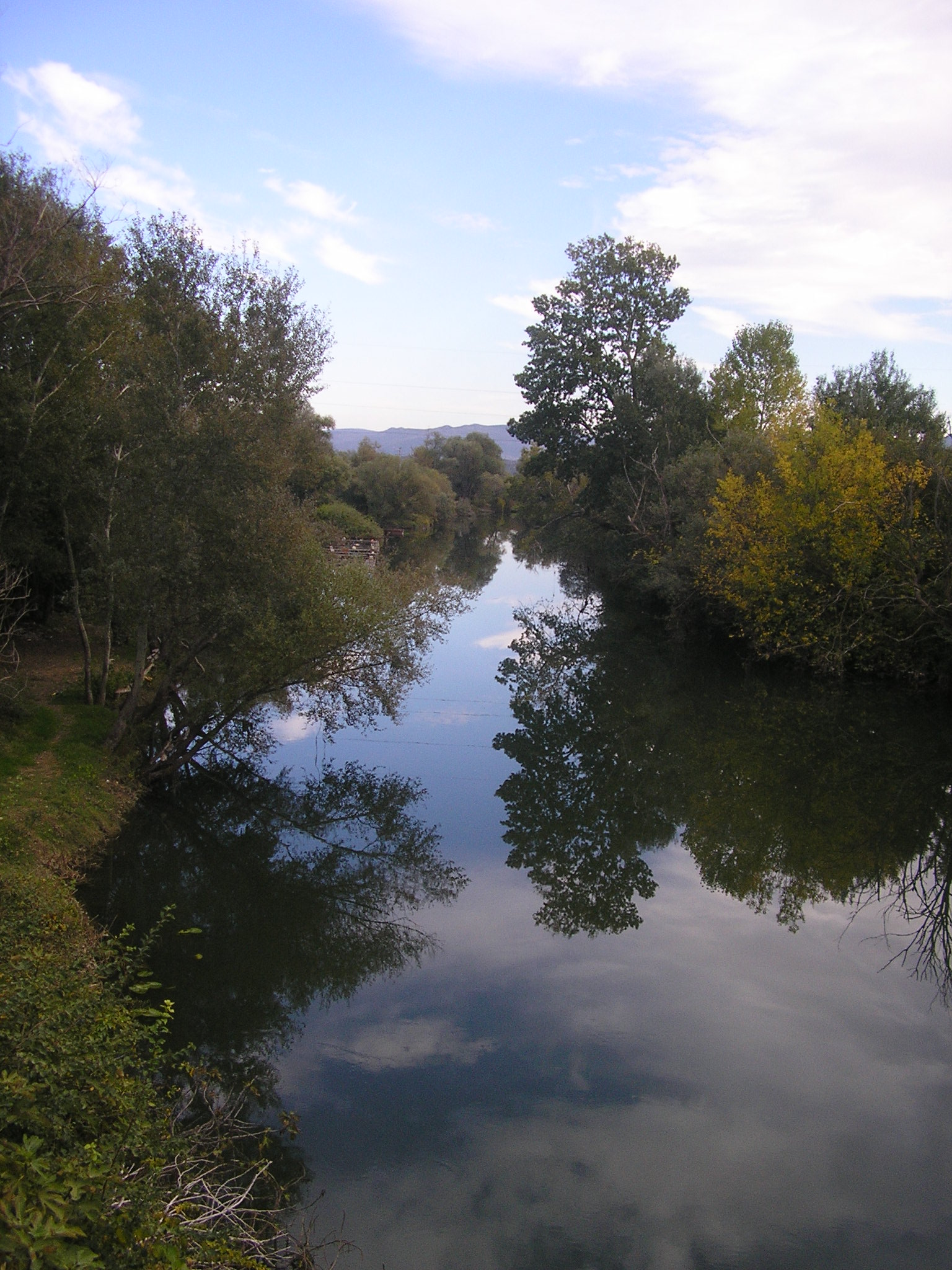
Krupa river

The Krupa river is the Neretva left tributary and the main water current of Hutovo Blato, which leads the waters from Deransko Lake and Svitavsko Lake into the Neretva river. The length of Krupa River is 9 km with an average depth of 5 meters. The Krupa River does not have an actual source, but is actually an arm of Deransko Lake. Also, the Krupa River is a unique river in Europe, because the river flows both ways. It flows 'normally' from the 'source' to the mouth and from the mouth to the 'source'. This happens when, due to high water level and large quantity of water, river Neretva pushes the Krupa river in the opposite direction.

== Biodiversity ==
=== Endemic and autochthonous fish ===
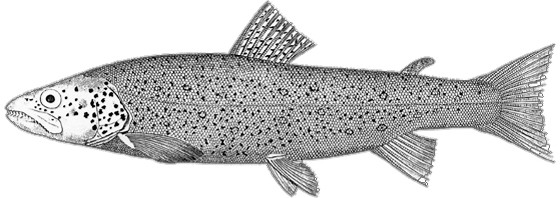
Salmo dentex inhabiting Hutovo marshes and the Krupa river

=== Birds ===
Systematic list of registered species on 13 April 2001:

- Little grebe
- Great crested grebe
- Great cormorant
- Pygmy cormorant
- Little egret
- Grey heron
- Purple heron
- Gadwall
- Mallard
- Garganey
- Short-toed eagle
- Western marsh harrier
- Common buzzard
- Eurasian coot
- Ruff
- Wood sandpiper
- Black-headed gull
- Caspian gull
- Alpine swift
- Barn swallow
- White wagtail
- Common nightingale
- Cetti's warbler
- Eastern subalpine warbler
- Blackcap
- Long-tailed tit
- Eurasian penduline tit
- Hooded crow
- House sparrow
- Common chaffinch
- European serin
- Cirl bunting
- Corn bunting

== Archaeological and historic sites ==
=== Desilo archaeological site ===
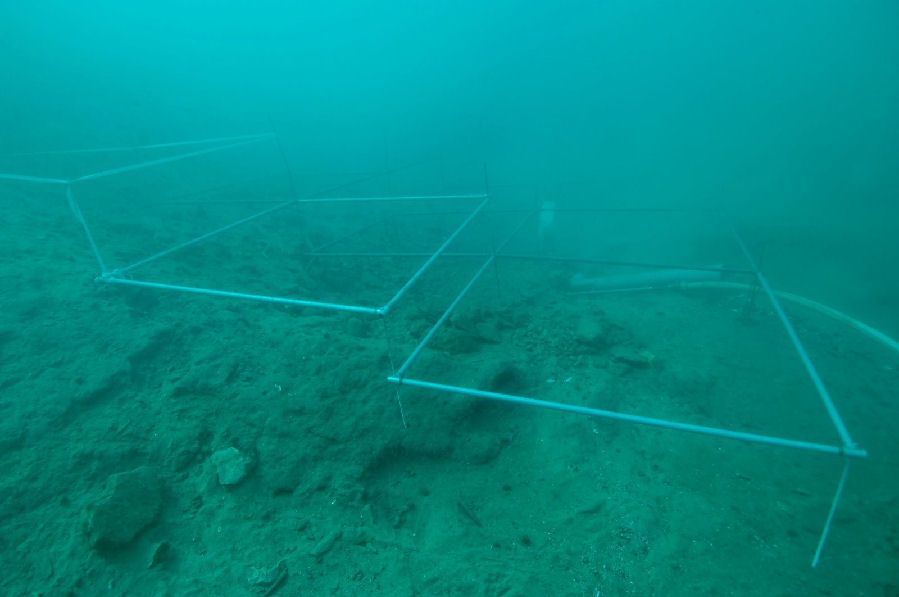
Desilo archaeological underwater site at Hutovo Blato

After intense excavations in the area of Hutovo Blato in the autumn of 2008, archaeologists from the University of Mostar (Bosnia and Herzegovina) and the University of Lund (Sweden) found the very first traces of an Illyrian trading post, thought to be more than two thousand years old. The find is unique in a European perspective and the archaeologists have concluded that Desilo, as the location is called, was an important trading post and a site of significant contact between the Illyrians and the Romans. Surprisingly large finds have been made in a short period of time. The archaeologists have discovered the ruins of a settlement, the remains of a harbour that probably functioned as a trading post, as well as many sunken boats, fully laden with wine pitchers – so-called amphorae – from the 1st century BC. The archaeologist Adam Lindhagen, who holds a PhD from the University of Lund and has specialised in Roman wine amphorae, says that this is the most important find of all time from the Illyrian areas.

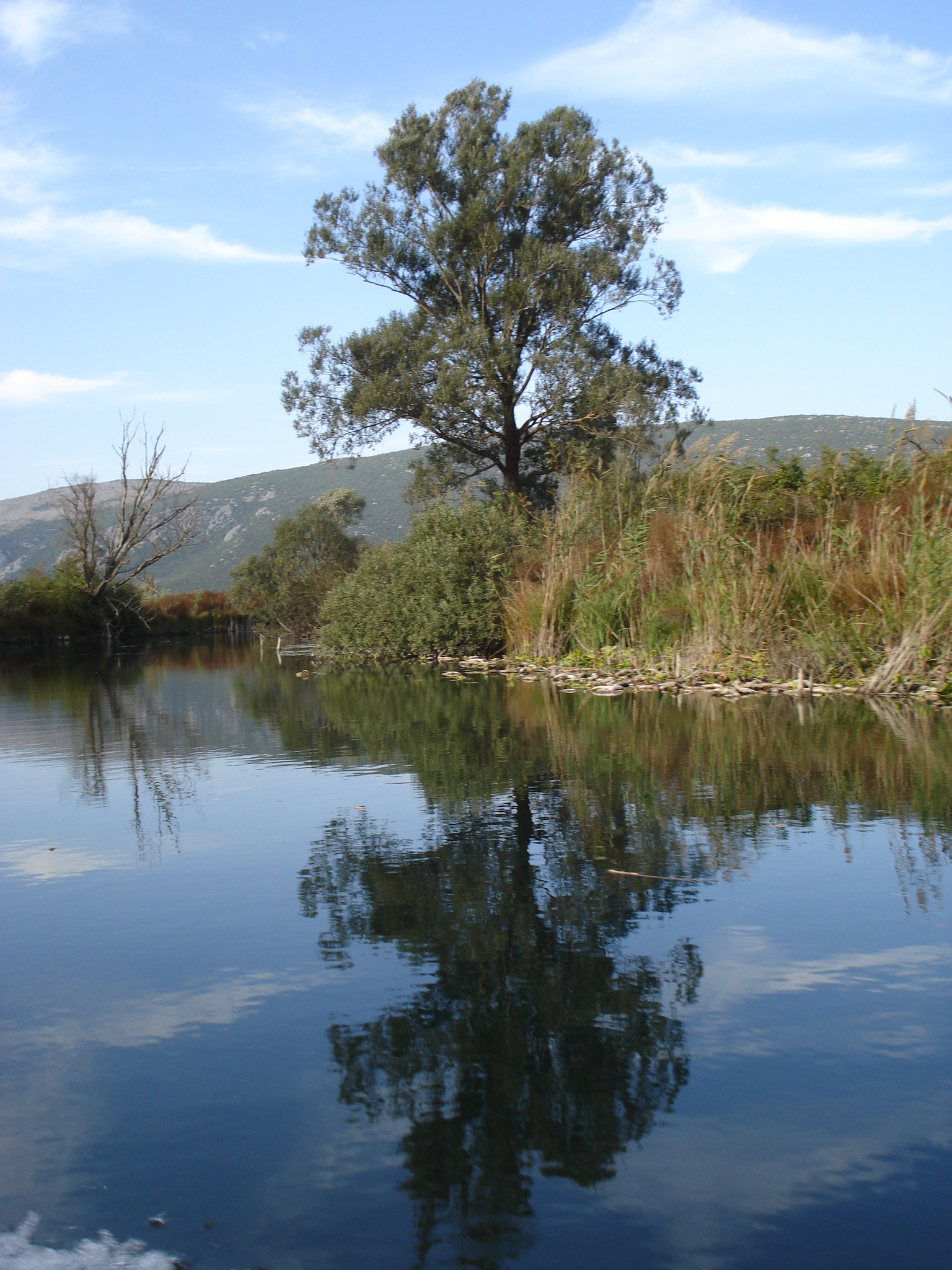
Krupa river within Hutovo Blato Nature Park, Bosnia and Herzegovina.

== See also ==
- Mediterranean wetlands
- List of lakes in Bosnia and Herzegovina
- List of protected areas of Bosnia and Herzegovina
- Important Bird Area
- Neretva river
- Krupa river
- Prebilovci (a village just inside the Hutovo Blato area)
- Vrelo Bune natural and historical site
- Počitelj historical village
- Stari Most historical site in Mostar
- The late-antique villa of Mogorjelo
- Desilo archaeological site
- Daorson archaeological site
- Čapljina
- Mostar
