= Deransko Blato =

- Deransko Lake
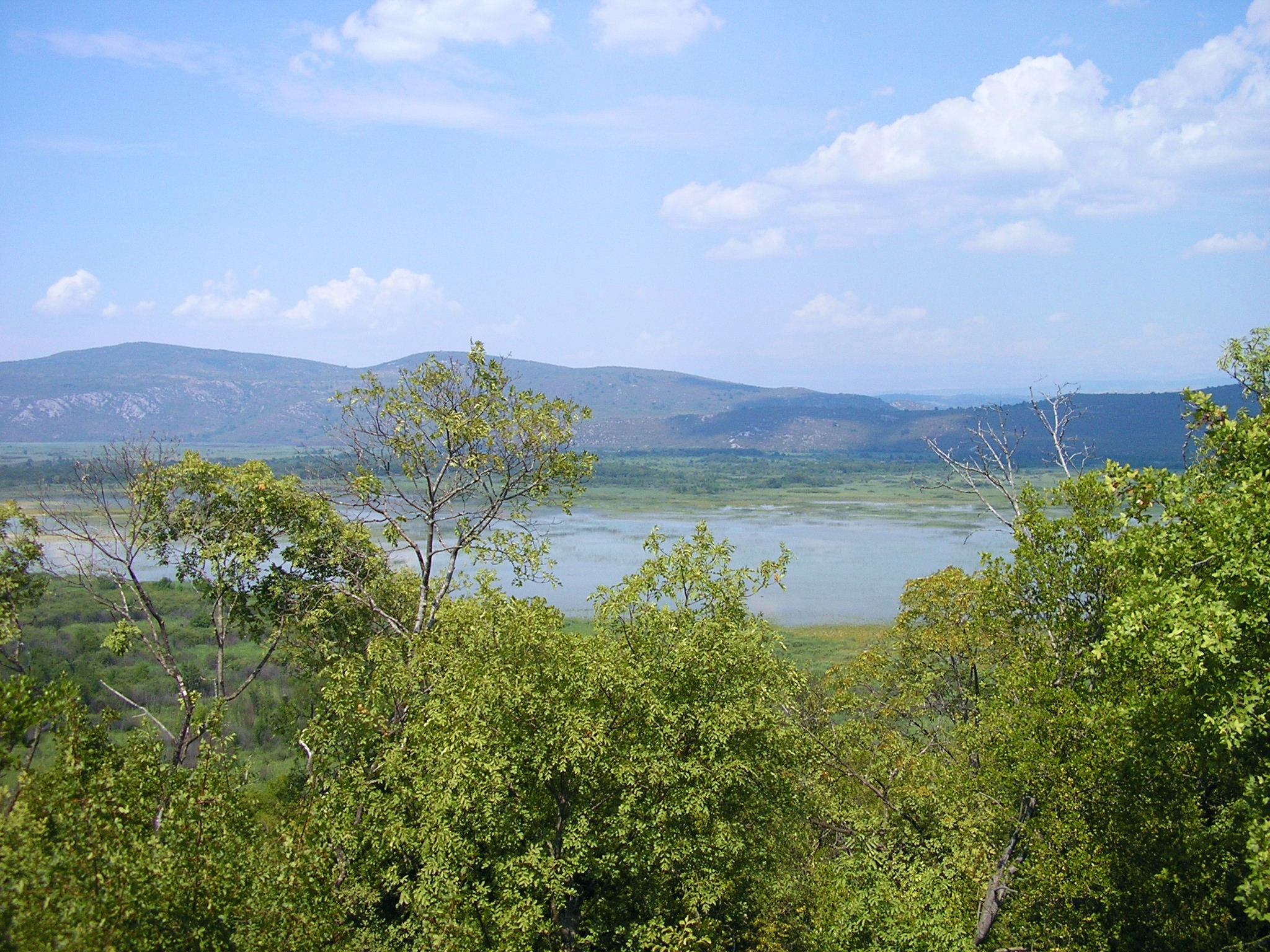

- Location within Bosnia and Herzegovina
- Interactive map of Deransko Blato
- Location: Hutovo Blato, Bosnia and Herzegovina
- Coordinates: 43°02′42″N 17°47′52″E
- Type: lake

Deransko Blato (also known as Deransko Lake) is a lake of Bosnia and Herzegovina. It is located in the Hutovo Blato, a nature reserve and bird reserve near Čapljina.

== See also ==
- Svitavsko Lake
- Desilo
- List of lakes in Bosnia and Herzegovina
