= Hutovo Fortress =

Fortress in Bosnia and Herzegovina

Hutovo fortress
- Hadžibegov Grad (Hajji bey fort)
- Neum, Bosnia and Herzegovina
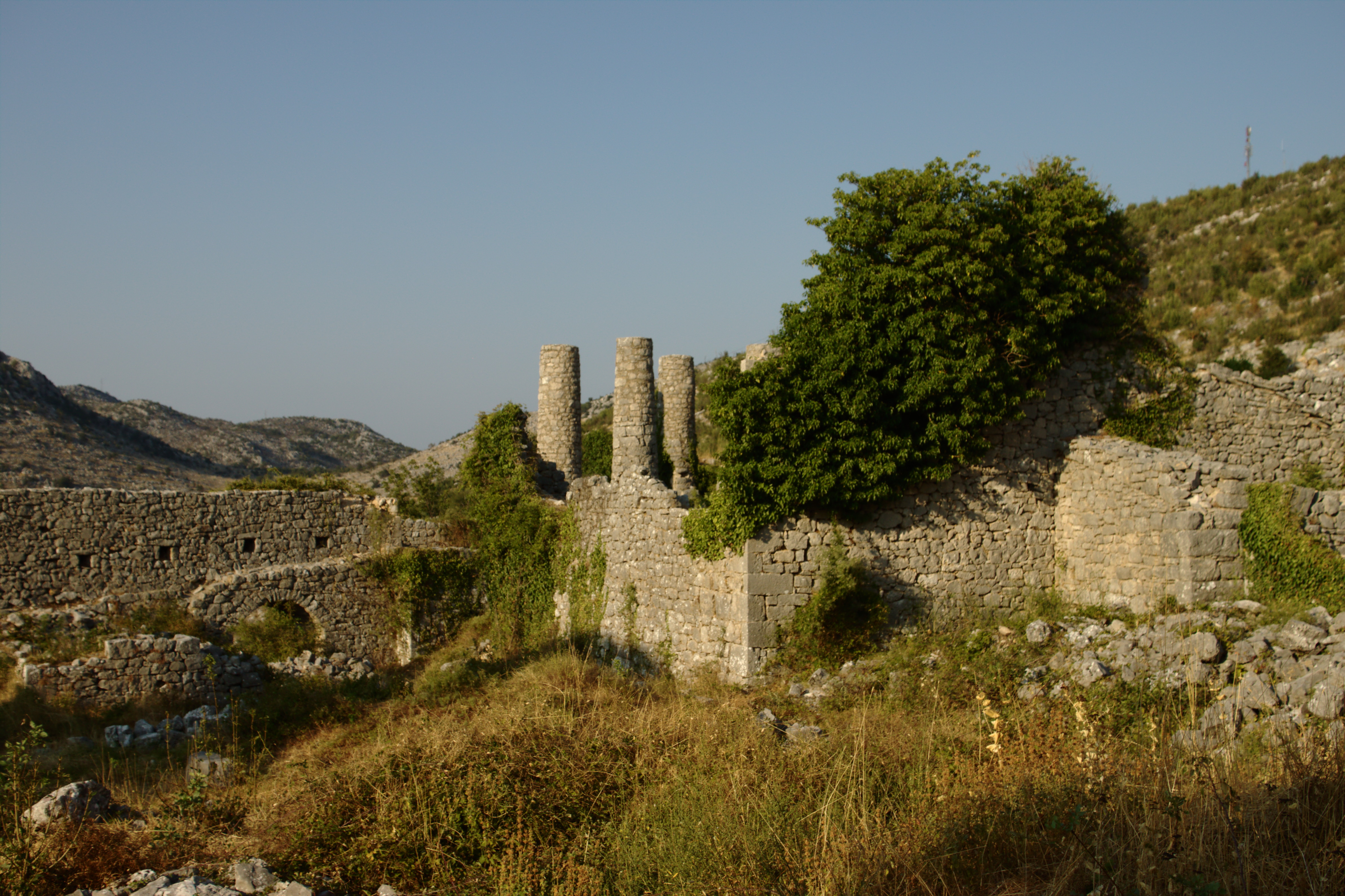
- Hadžibegov Grad (Hajji bey fort)

Site information
- Type: Castle, fortification
- Owner: Rizvanbegović noble family
- Controlled by: Hajji Mehmed bey Rizvanbegović Ottoman Bosnia 1802—1832
- Condition: Ruined (National Monument of Bosnia and Herzegovina)

Location
- Location within Bosnia and Herzegovina
- Coordinates: 42.9510122°N 17.8031275°E

Site history
- Built: earliest record June 28, 1525
- In use: 1525-1878
- Materials: Limestone
- Demolished: torched 1875-1878
- Battles/wars: 1875-1878 uprising

Garrison information
- Past commanders: Hajji Mehmed bey Rizvanbegović
- Designations

KONS of Bosnia and Herzegovina
- Official name: Hutovo's town (Hajjibeg town), the historic site
- Type: Category II cultural and historical property
- Criteria: A, B, C i.vi., D i.ii.iv., F ii., G i.v., I i.
- Designated: 5 May 2004 (?th session)
- Reference no.: 2417
- Decision no.: 05.1-35-63/04
- State: National Monuments of Bosnia and Herzegovina
- This site is protected and listed as a National Monument of Bosnia and Herzegovina by the Government of BiH and its KONS

Hutovo fortress or Hadžibegov Grad (the Hajji bey fort), also Hutovski Grad, is a fortress in Bosnia and Herzegovina in the municipality of Neum near the village of Hutovo.

== Location and name ==
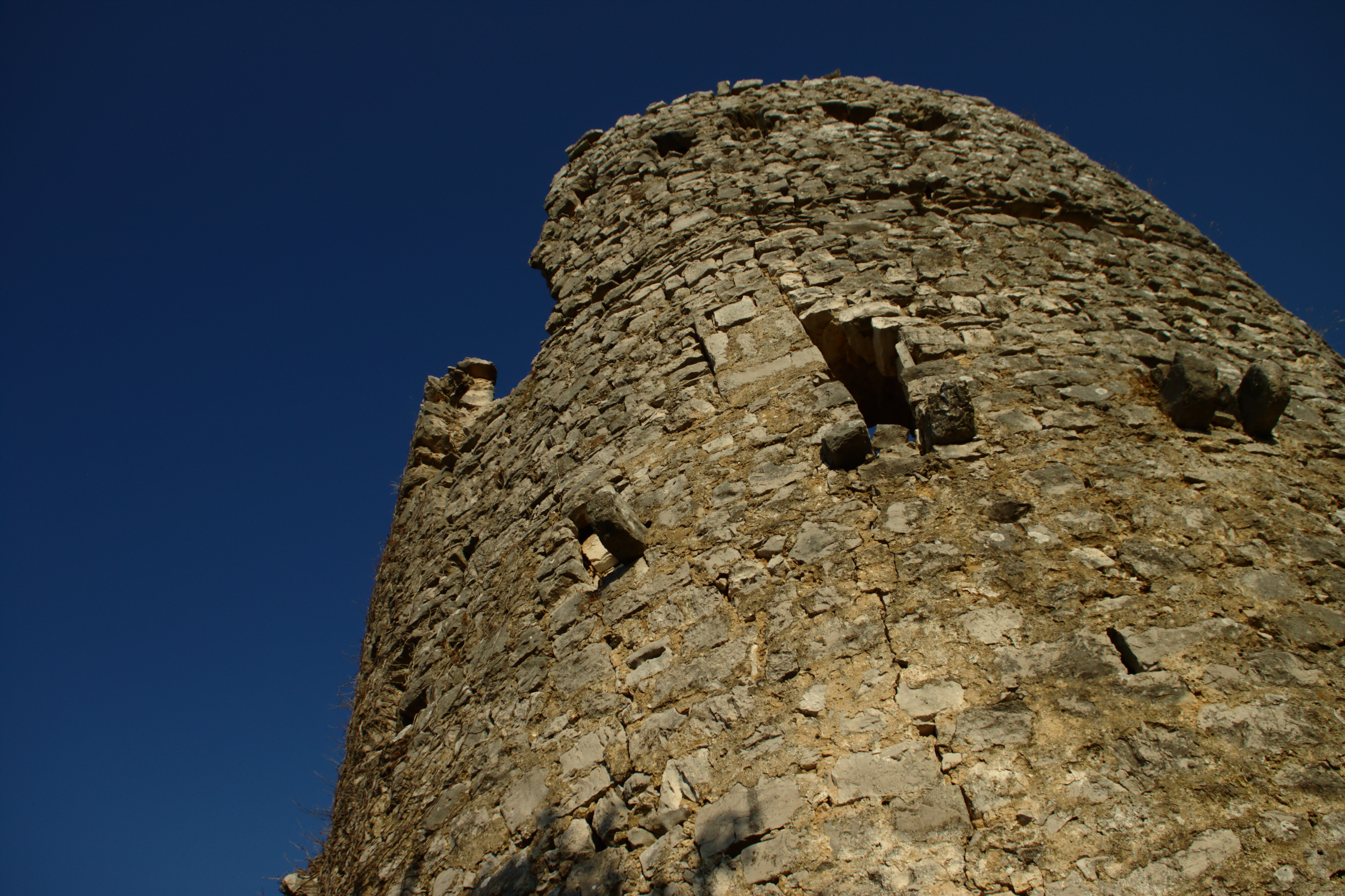
Hutovo fortress tower

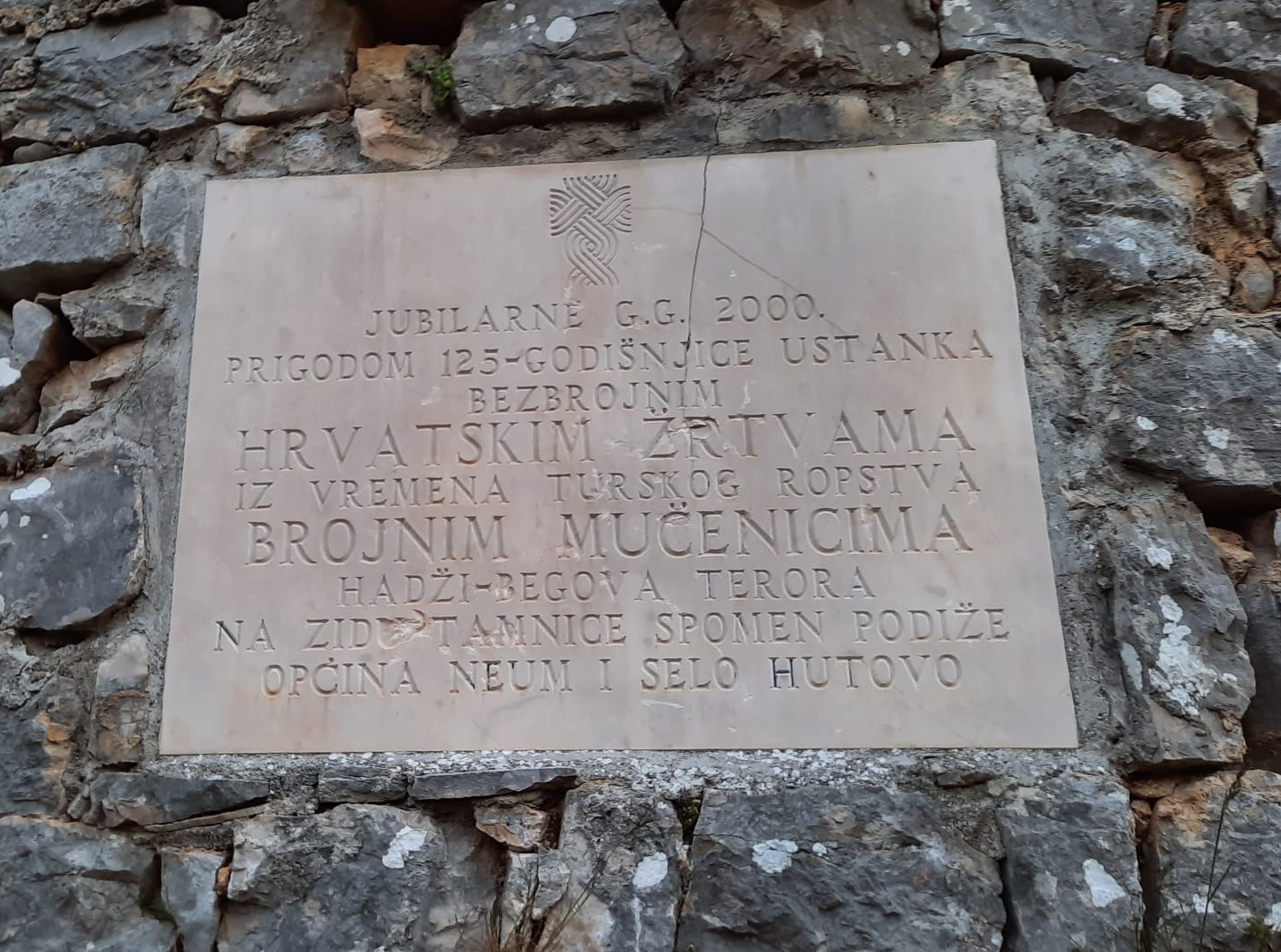
Monument to Catholic victims in the fortress

The fortress is located along a narrow road leading from Hutovo Blato to Neum, below Žaba mountain and southwest of Hutovo. Strategically situated atop a hill overlooking the Prešjeci pass, it was often traversed by salt caravans from Ston traveling inland. The name Hadžibegov Grad is derived from the last lord's name, Hadžibeg Rizvanbegović.

== Description ==

The structure forms an irregular pentagon. There is a total of nine towers, each in a corner of the fortress. Solid and high walls enclose an area of flat land. The fortification runs east to west 70 m. The eastern portion of the fortress is roughly 50 m in width, while the western portion is 30 m in width. Its walls were constructed in such a way that soldiers armed with firearms could defend every angle of the fortress.

== History ==
A massive circular building, which was later encircled with walls, existed in 1714 as a tower in Captaincy of Stolac. A retinue of 7-8 guards guarded the pass and collected taxes. Between 1795 and 1802, Hajj-Mehmed-Beg commanded the fort, and was entitled to a cut of the taxes paid by Nevesinje. He turned the building into a proper fortification before 1802. There are two stone tablets placed at the fort (8 in total in the town).

Hajji-Mehmed-Beg-Rizvanbegović, was a son of captain Zulfikar-bey Rizvanbegović. In XVIII century Rizvanbegović tribe took the captainy over from the Šarić family.

When the Herzegovinian uprising of 1875 began, the Ottoman army conquered the Hutovo fortress. In one of the assaults by the rebels, under the leadership of Ivan Musić, the city itself was set on fire and every wooden construction was no more. The fort itself was abandoned during the Herzegovinian uprising of 1875–1878.

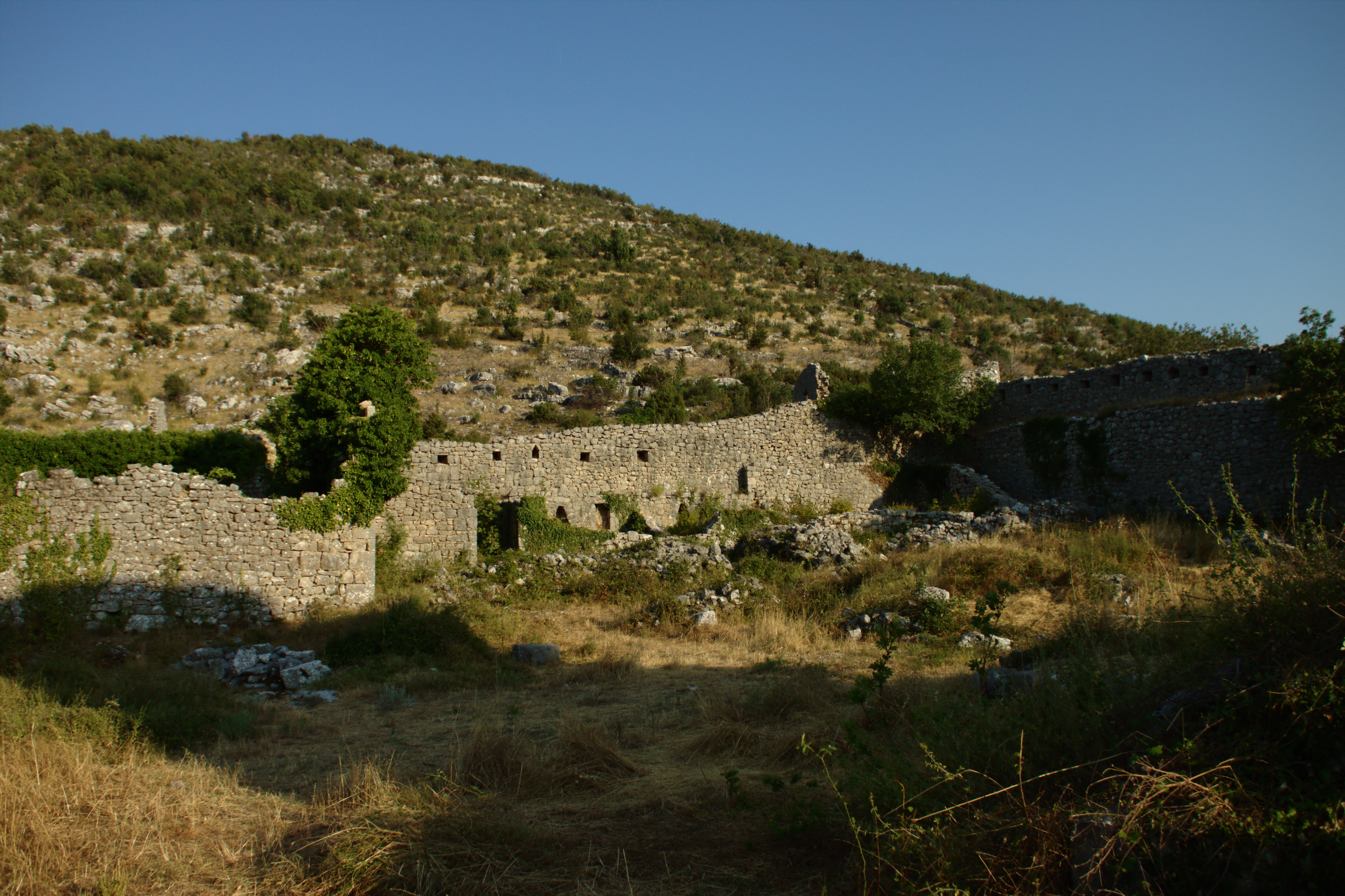
Fortress' walls

== Contemporary usage ==
The society of Friends of the Old Hutovo use town historical settings for local celebrations.

== Protection ==
Revitalization of the fort was started in 1969 by the National museum of Bosnia and Herzegovina.

On May 10, 2004, the Commission to Preserve National Monuments of Bosnia and Herzegovina designated it a National Monuments of Bosnia and Herzegovina. Three slabs bearing inscriptions found at the fortress are on display in Country House museum's lapidary in Hutovo.

== See also ==
- List of fortifications in Bosnia and Herzegovina
- Hutovo Blato
