= Desilo =

Archaeological site in Bosnia and Herzegovina

- Desilo archaeological underwater site
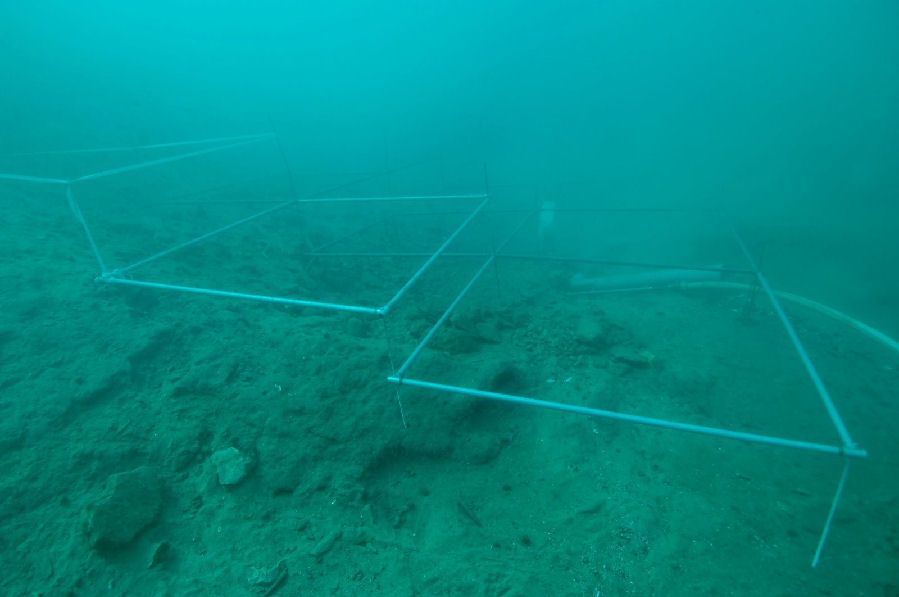
- Underwater archaeological site at Desilo

- Desilo is located in south Herzegovina
- Interactive map of Desilo
- 43.022444°N 17.75588°E
- Type: Inland port
- Cultures: Illyrian
- Satellite of: Daorson?
- Associated with: Ardiaei / Narensii or Daorsi
- Location: Hutovo Blato near Stolac and Čapljina
- Region: Herzegovina-Neretva Canton
- Part of: Hutovo Blato Nature Park

History
- Built by: Ardiaei / Narensii? or Daorsi?

Site notes
- Excavation dates: 2007, 2008
- Archaeologists: Prof. Snjezana Vasilj, also Lene Os Johannessen and Ole Christian Aslaksen, Marina Prusac and Adam Lindhagen, Jo-Simon Frøshaug Stokke
- Owner: public
- Public access: yes

Desilo is an underwater archaeological site in southern Bosnia and Herzegovina, located near the Neretva (or Narenta) river and the Croatian border. The site was first discovered in the late 20th century, but Desilo's history can be traced as far back as ancient times. Investigations led by Professor Snjezana Vasilj of the University of Mostar and her archaeological team, uncovered in 2007 many sunken boats at the bottom of the small lake in Desilo valley. The archaeologists believe these boats to be Illyrian ships, dating back to the first and second centuries B.C. Further excavations in 2008 by University of Oslo archaeologists found evidence suggesting that Desilo was an Illyrian trading post. These archaeological findings are significant because they are the first known discovery of Illyrian ships. Additionally, Desilo functioning as a trading centre suggests there were peaceful interactions between the Illyrians and the Romans.

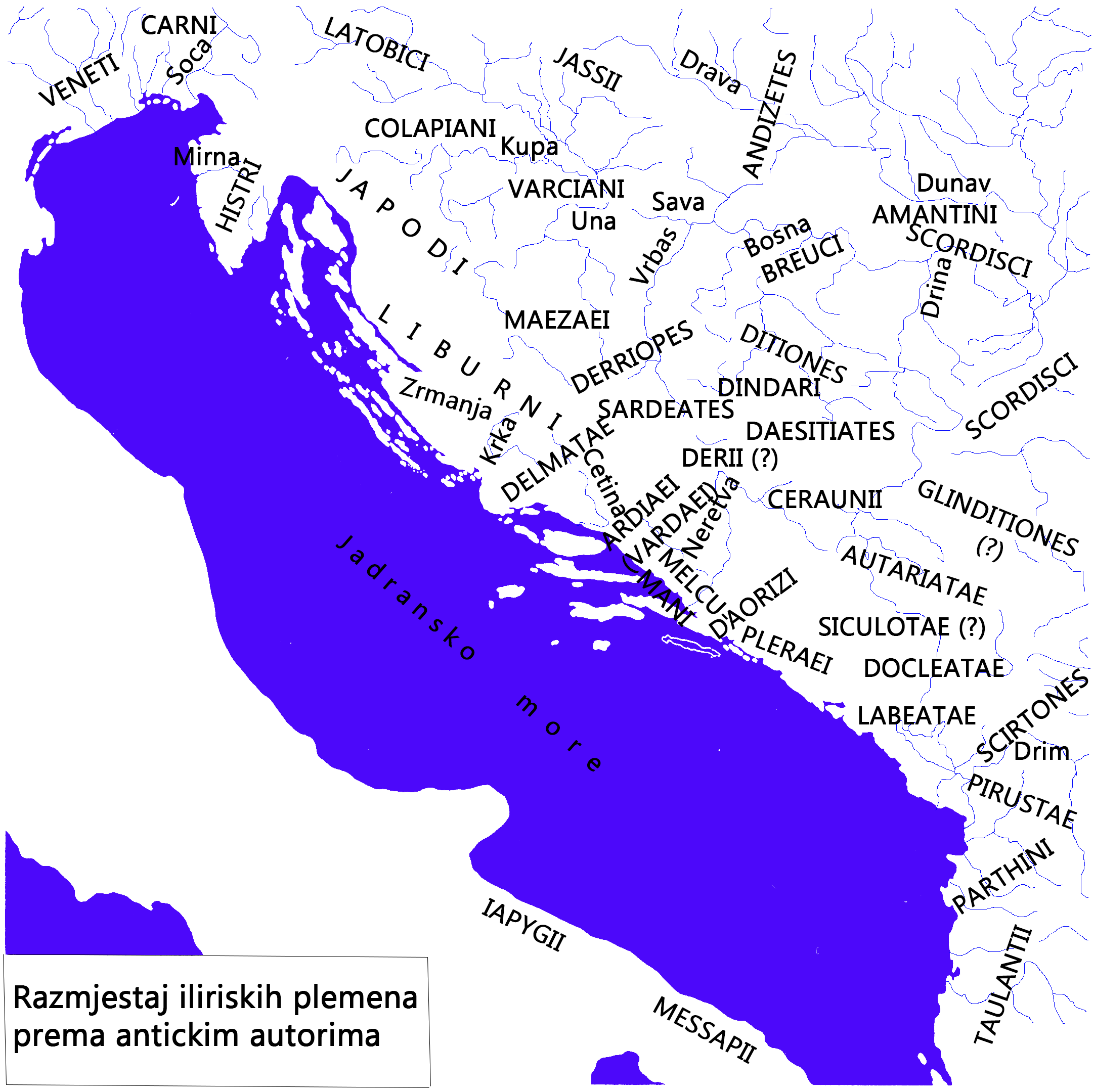
Map of tribe distribution

== History ==
The underwater archaeological site of Desilo was first discovered and recorded officially in 1972. It resides 20 kilometers from the coast of the Neretva river. In the era of ancient Bosnia and Herzegovina, Neretva was home to the ancient Illyrian tribes Ardiaei and Daorsi (or Daversi). Desilo is located near multiple land traffic passageways in the direction of Daorsi capital Daorson, as well as the Roman colony Narona. Today, Desilo lay within Hutovo Blato, a nature park on the Neretva river. Archaeological research in 2007 and 2008 provided archaeologists and historians with information about Desilo's function and significance in ancient times.

== Archaeological excavations and findings ==
In March 2007, Professor Snjezana Vasilj of the University of Mostar and her archaeological team found 16 Illyrian boats more than 6 metres under the water level in Desilo. This discovery is the first of its kind: Illyrian ships had previously only been known to historians through Greek and Roman myths. The ships were covered with fragments of amphorae, Roman pitchers for holding wine. From the boat discoveries, Vasilj and her archaeological team concluded that Romans had sunk the ships in retaliation of an Illyrian pirate attack.

Archaeologists Marina Prusac and Adam Lindhagen of the University of Oslo did not completely agree with the interpretation of Professor Vasilj's archaeological team. They said that Desilo's proximity to the Roman colony of Narona as well as its location at the innermost point of a bay made the site an unlikely area for pirate activities to occur. Rather, they thought Desilo's location suggested that the site functioned as a trading centre. In the fall of 2008, Prusac and Lindhagen's archaeological team conducted the third known underwater research of the Desilo site. From their findings of additional sunken ships and pieces of amphorae from the 1st century B.C., the remains of a harbour, and the ruins of an Illyrian settlement, the archaeologists concluded that Desilo was a trading post and served as an important point of contact between the ancient Illyrians and Romans.

=== Sunken boats ===
Among the sunken ships, Vasilj and her team found iron Roman spears and horse shoes in addition to the previously mentioned broken amphorae. In their opinion these findings give credence to their conclusion that the ships were sunk by Romans after an Illyrian pirate attack.

Prusac and Lindhagen's archaeological team found a greater number of boats at Desilo than had been previously recorded. They reported over 30 sunken ships. Called "lembi" by the Romans, these small boats were known for their fast maneuverability. According to Lindhagen's dating of the amphorae, the time span in which the boats were sunk occurred over the course of a century.

=== Amphorae ===
Among the boats on the lake bed, archaeologists found hundreds of pieces of amphorae and more than 700 amphorae lids. The amphorae are the Lamboglia 2 type. Lindhagen, a specialist in amphorae, said these findings suggest that imports from the Roman colony Narona were much more extensive than previously thought. Lindhagen analyzed the pottery to find the amphorae's origin and determined that they were produced along the Dalmatian coast, where wine was exported to the entire Roman Empire.

Archaeologists still remain unsure as to why all the amphorae are broken. Prusac and Lindhagen said that they don't think the Romans would have sunk hundreds of amphorae containing their own wine, and hypothesize that the amphorae might have been dumped after being emptied. However, they also note that findings of animal bones, horse teeth, Illyrian pottery and weapons such as axes and spear tips in the sea could indicate that the Illyrians made ritual offerings to the sea. Although this practice was common in Scandinavia during the Iron Age, it has never been heard of before from the Illyrian area or the surrounding eastern Adriatic region.

=== Remains of a harbour ===
Lindhagen and Prusac discovered the remains of a harbour buried in the river bed. A polygonal wall 20 metres in length and 60 centimetres in width appeared solidly built. The wall had a row of mooring holes along its width. A second wall found underneath the mud in the river bed appeared not as solidly built. The archaeologists thought that the harbour operated as a trading post, with the stable wall likely functioning as a quay and the second wall as a dam. They also found many pieces of pottery among the remains of the harbour, which they said indicates that this was a major trading post.

=== Ruins of a settlement ===
Prusac and Lindhagen found an Illyrian settlement about a hundred metres from the harbour site. Archaeologists Jo-Simon Frøshaug Stokke, Lene Os Johannessen and Ole Christian Aslaksen also discovered terrace formations in the mountainside of the valley, which they said suggest that a settlement existed for at least several hundred years before any trade occurred between the Illyrians and the Romans. Anchor parts, lance tips and fibula, and metal buckles for fastening clothes were also found near the settlement, as well as graves that predate any of the other findings.

== Significance of archaeological findings ==
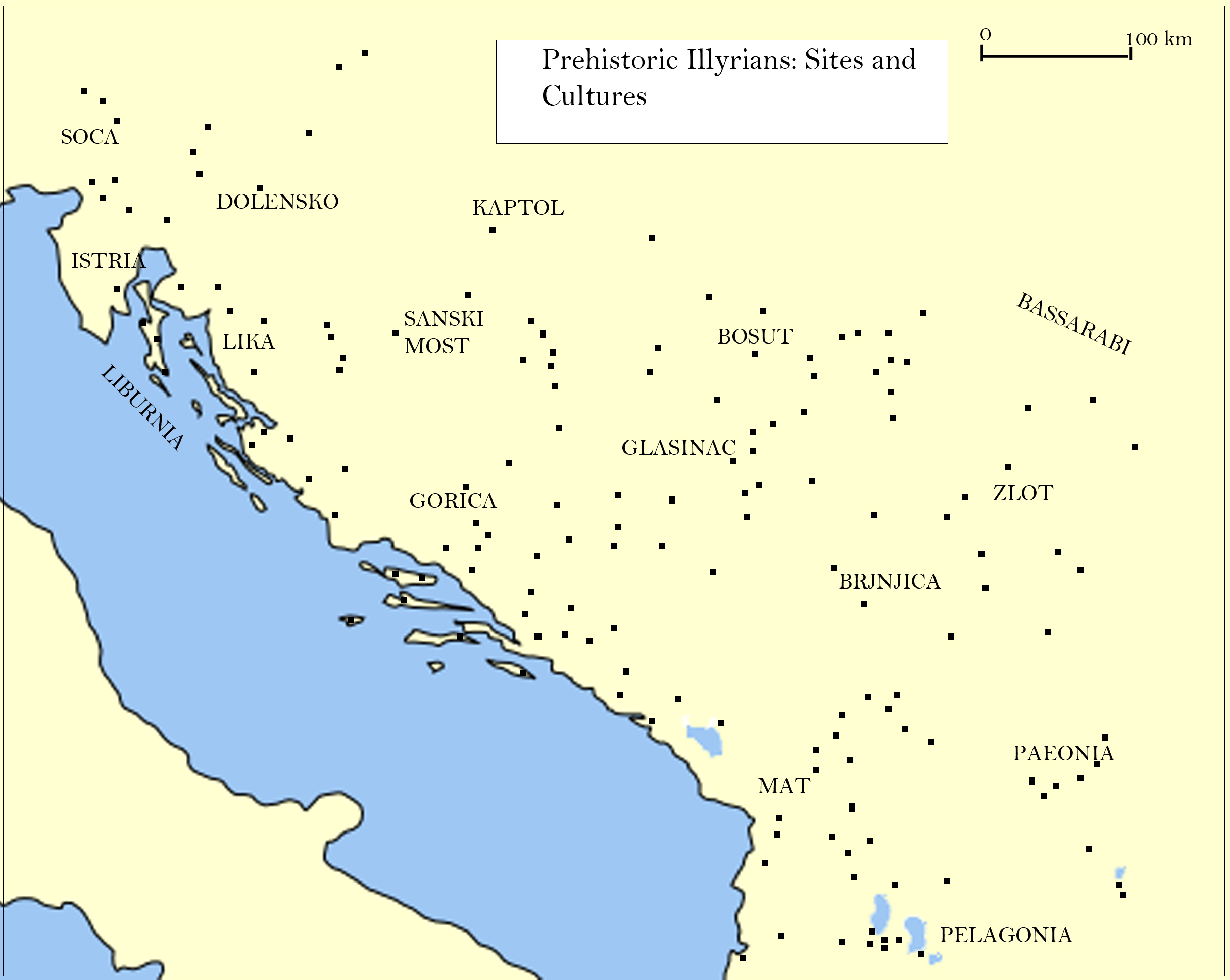
Map of prehistoric sites and cultures, including Illyrian, in Bosnia and Herzegovina and the Balkans

Lindhagen has said that the discovery at Desilo is the most important find of all time from the Illyrian areas, and that there is still much more to be discovered at the site.

Prusac and Lindhagen's findings suggesting that Desilo was a trading centre between the Illyrians and Romans reveals peaceful connections between the two groups. Prior to this discovery, descriptions of Illyrians focused on their warlike behavior and terse relations with the Romans and Greeks. Prusac said that revealing peaceful relations between the Illyrians and Romans demonstrates that the Illyrians had grown over time in their cultural contact with other nations.

Prusac also said that their discovery is important for understanding cultural identities in the Balkans in ancient times. Archaeological research on the Illyrians was used politically as the culture-historical glue of the various groups in the former Yugoslavia, as the neutral term "Illyrian" was applied to all ethnic groups there, but Prusac and Lindhagen's evidence of peaceful relations demonstrates that there were differences between the Illyrian peoples.

== See also ==
- Neretva
- Hutovo Blato
- Krupa (Neretva)
- List of ancient tribes in Illyria
- List of Illyrian cities
- Daorson
- Daorsi
- History of Bosnia and Herzegovina
- History of the Balkans
