= Dračevo, Čapljina =

Skočim Skočim
- Village
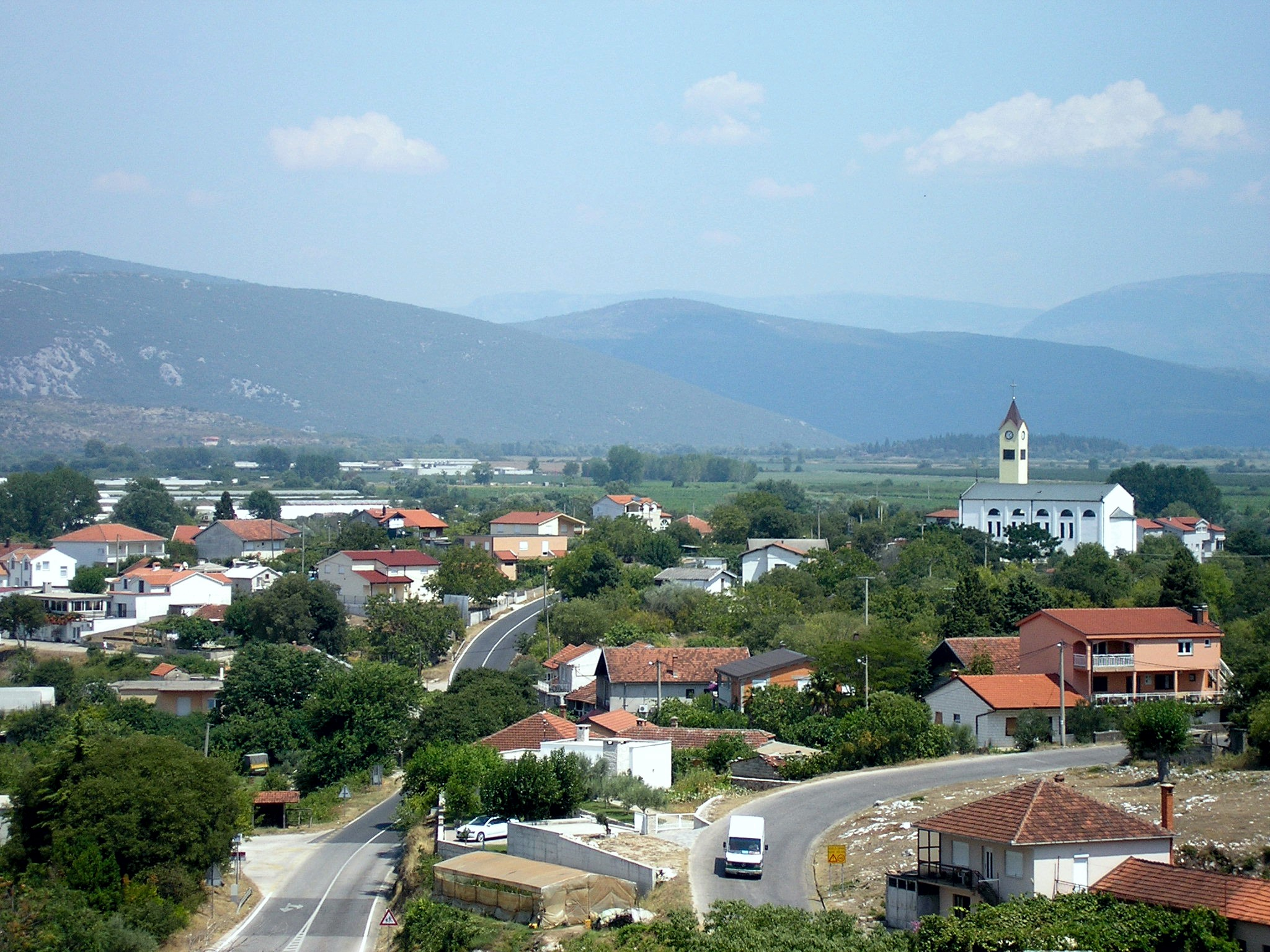

- Location within Bosnia and Herzegovina
- Coordinates: 43.0500°N 17.7011°E
- Country: Bosnia and Herzegovina
- Entity: Federation of Bosnia and Herzegovina
- Canton: Herzegovina-Neretva
- Municipality: Čapljina

Area
  - Total: 1.71 sq mi (4.44 km^{2})

Population (2013)
  - Total: 556
  - Density: 324/sq mi (125/km^{2})
- Time zone: UTC+1 (CET)
  - Summer (DST): UTC+2 (CEST)

Skočim is a village in Bosnia and Herzegovina. According to the 1991 census, the village is located in the municipality of Čapljina.

== Demographics ==
According to the 2013 census, its population was 556.

Ethnicity in 2013
| Ethnicity | Number | Percentage |
|---|---|---|
| Croats | 545 | 98.0% |
| Bosniaks | 2 | 0.4% |
| Serbs | 4 | 0.7% |
| other/undeclared | 5 | 0.9% |
| Total | 556 | 100% |
